= Anu ziggurat =

Ziggurat in Uruk, Iraq

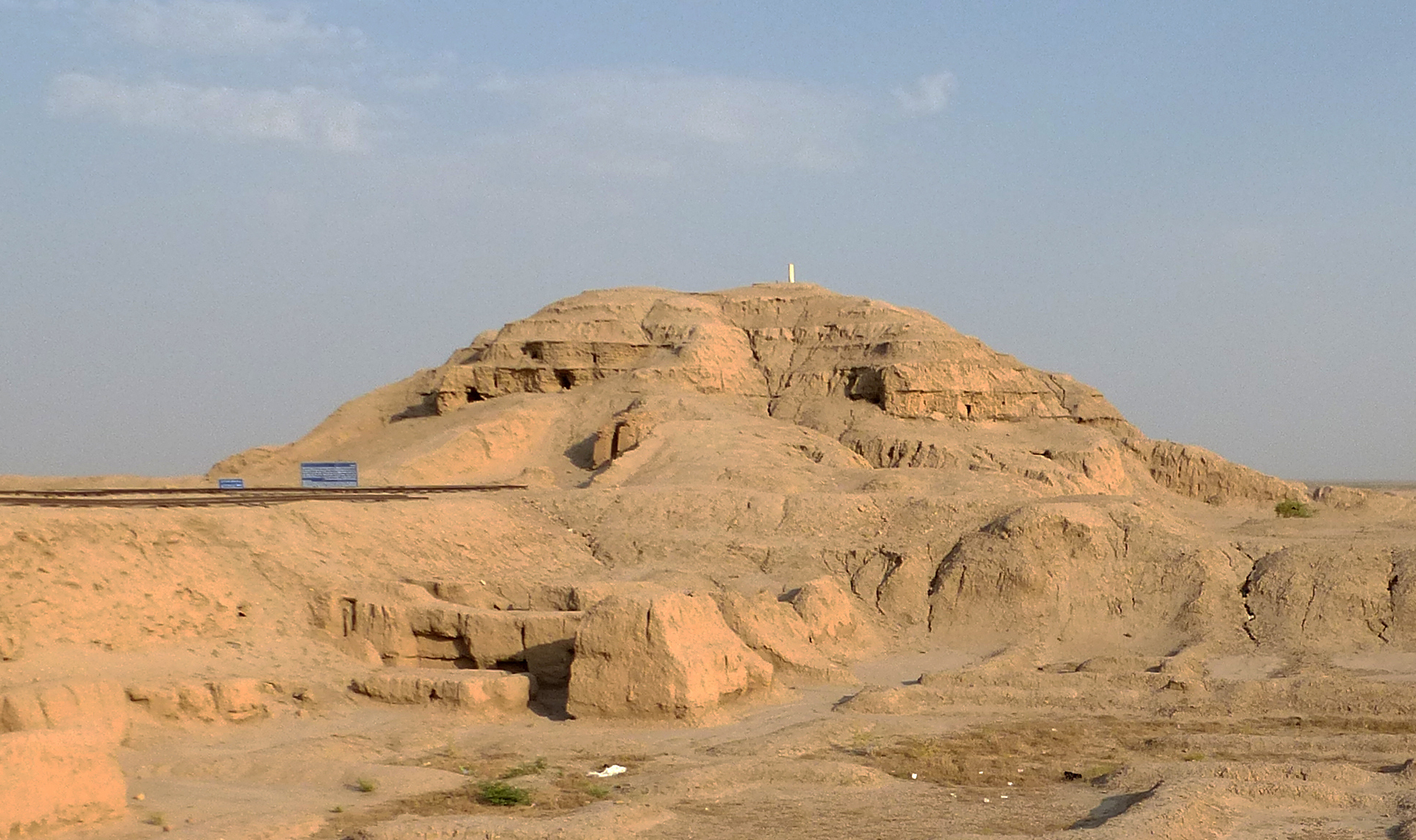
- The ziggurat in 2020
- Type: Temple
- Location: Muthanna, Iraq

History
- Built: Construction started; c. 4000 BC; Completed; c. 3100 BC

Site notes
- Material: Limestone
- Height: 21 m (69 ft)

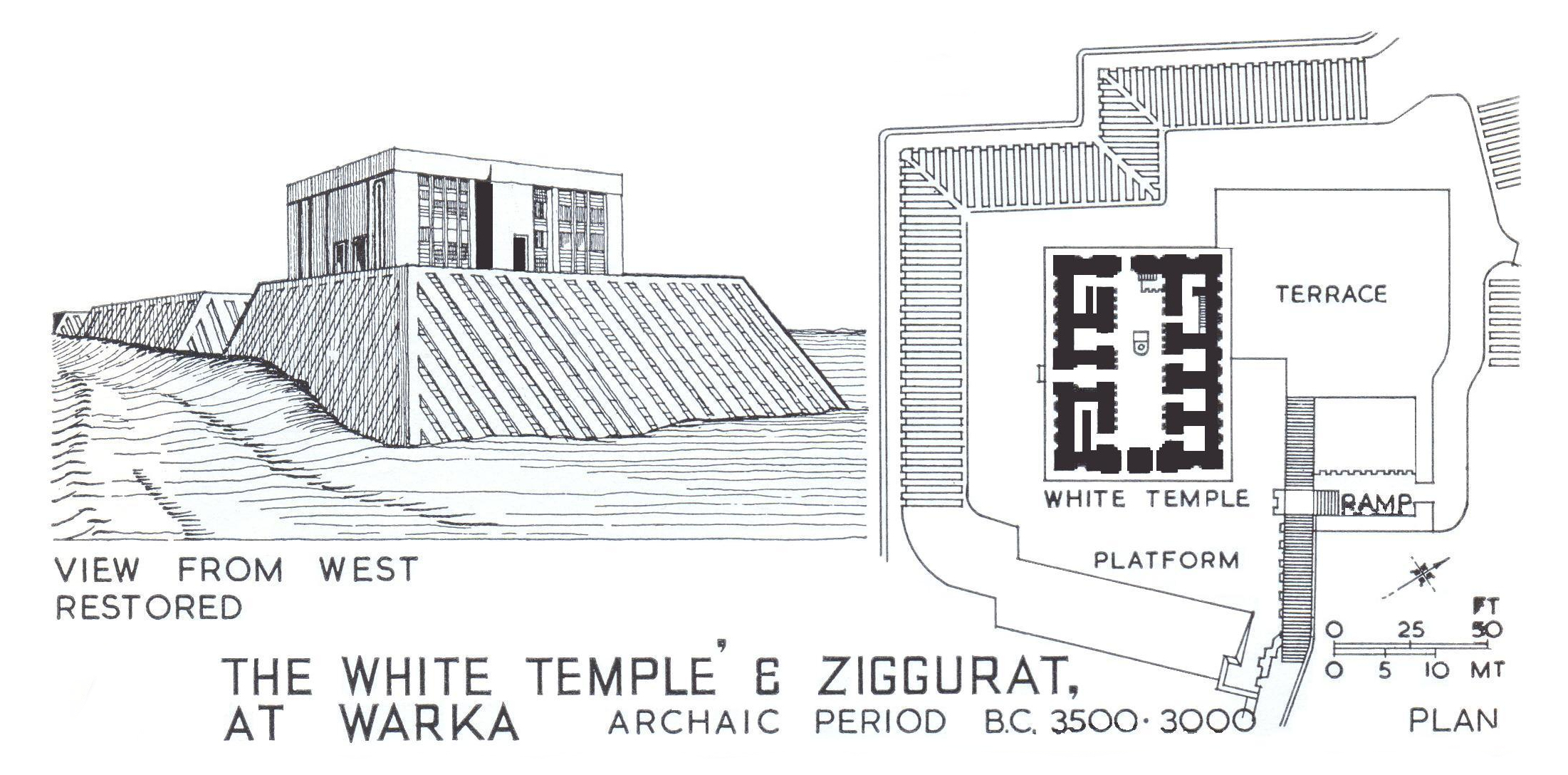
The original pyramidal structure, the "Anu ziggurat" dates to around 4000 BC, and the White Temple was built on top of it c. 3500–3000 BC

The Anu ziggurat is a ziggurat in the city of Uruk.

The single massive terrace makes up the area traditionally called the Anu district. It was originally proposed to have been dedicated to the Sumerian sky god Anu. Sometime in the Uruk III period (3100–2900 BC) the massive White Temple was built atop the ziggurat. Under the northwest edge of the ziggurat an Uruk VI period structure, the Stone Temple, has been discovered.

It is often assumed that the so-called "White Temple," which dates back to the Uruk IV period (3500–3100 BC) was Anu's original cult center, and it is even sometimes referred to as the "Anu ziggurat" in modern literature. However, there is no evidence that Anu was actually worshipped in this structure.

With a height of 13 metres, it overtook the Tower of Jericho as the world's tallest structure from its creation around 4000 BC until around 2667 BC when it was overtaken by the Pyramid of Djoser.

The temple was built of limestone and bitumen on a podium of rammed earth and plastered with lime mortar. The podium itself was built over a woven reed mat called ĝipar, which was ritually used as a nuptial bed. The ĝipar was a source of generative power which then radiated upward into the structure. The structure of the Stone Temple further develops some mythological concepts from Enuma Elish, perhaps involving libation rites as indicated from the channels, tanks, and vessels found there. The structure was ritually destroyed, covered with alternating layers of clay and stone, then excavated and filled with mortar sometime later.

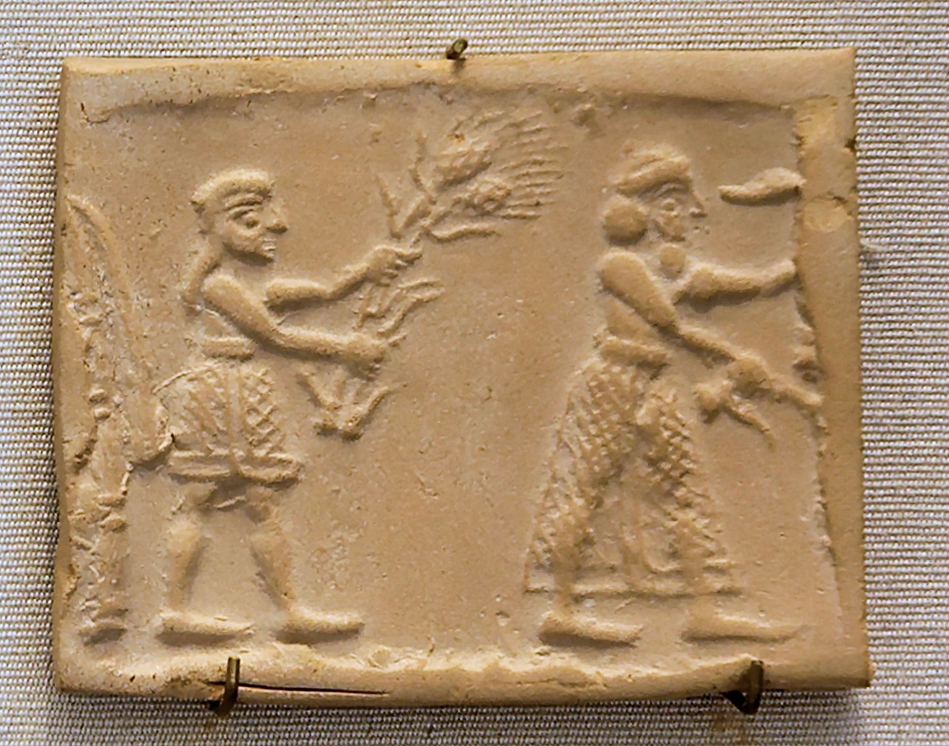
Uruk King priest feeding the sacred herd

The Anu ziggurat began with a massive mound topped by a cella during the Uruk period (c. 4000 BC), and was expanded through 14 phases of construction. These phases have been labeled L to A₃ (L is sometimes called X). The earliest phase used architectural features similar to PPNA cultures in Anatolia: a single chamber cella with a terrazzo floor beneath which bucrania were found. In phase E, corresponding to the Uruk III period (c. 3200–3000 BC), the White Temple was built. The White Temple could be seen from a great distance across the plain of Sumer, as it was elevated 21 m and covered in gypsum plaster which reflected sunlight like a mirror. In addition to this temple the Anu ziggurat had a monumental limestone-paved staircase and a trough running parallel to the staircase was used to drain the ziggurat.

Records
Preceded by Tower of Jericho	World's tallest structure c. 4000 BC - c. 2667 BC; 13 m	Succeeded by Pyramid of Djoser
