= Pyramid of Djoser =

Archeological site in Egypt

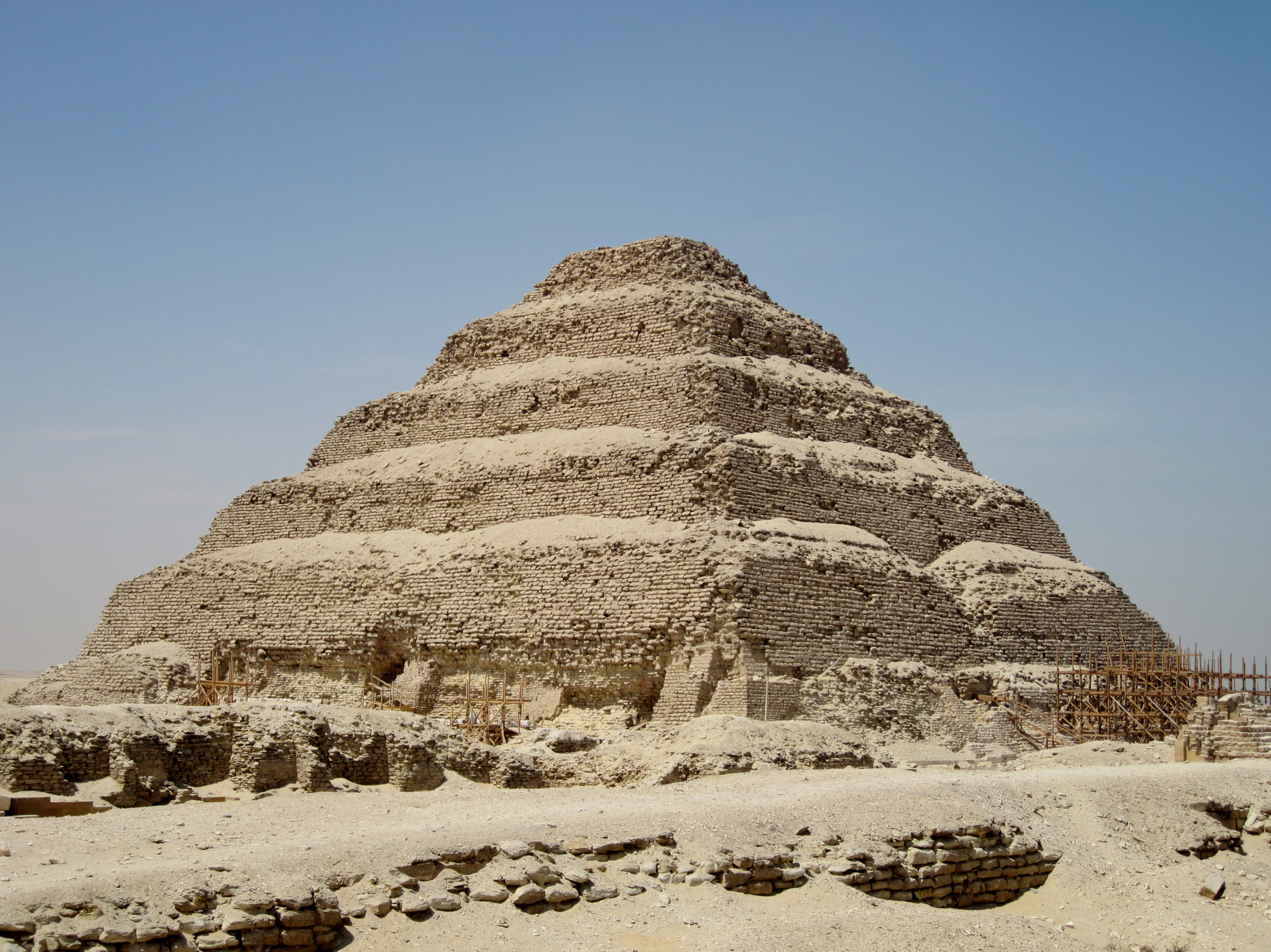
- Djoser's step pyramid at Saqqara, seen from the southeast

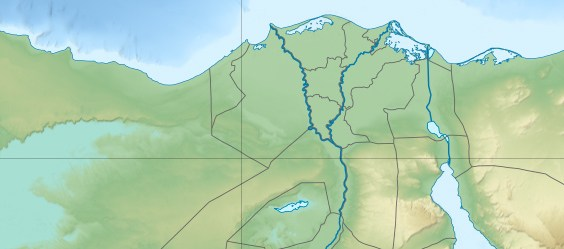
- Location within Lower Egypt
- 29°52′16″N 31°13′00″E
- Owner: Supreme Council of Antiquities
- Architect: Imhotep
- Constructed: c. 2667–2648 BC (3rd dynasty)
- Type: Step pyramid
- Material: Limestone
- Height: 62.5 m (205 ft; 119 cu) (Note: In this article, the unit symbol "cu" represents an ancient Egyptian royal cubit of 0.524 metres or 1.72 feet.)
- Base: 121 m (397 ft; 231 cu) by 109 m (358 ft; 208 cu)
- Volume: 330,400 m^{3} (11,667,966 ft^{3})

UNESCO World Heritage Site
- Part of: Memphis and its Necropolis – the Pyramid Fields from Giza to Dahshur
- Criteria: Cultural: i, iii, vi
- Reference: 86-002
- Inscription: 1979 (3rd Session)

The Pyramid of Djoser, (Note: Also called Djeser, Zoser, Tosorthros and Sesorthos.) also known as the Step Pyramid of Djoser or Step Pyramid of Horus Netjerikhet, is an archaeological site in the Saqqara necropolis, Egypt, northwest of the ruins of Memphis. It was the first Egyptian pyramid to be built. The six-tier, four-sided structure is the earliest colossal stone building in Egypt. It was built in the 27th century BC during the 3rd Dynasty for the burial of Pharaoh Djoser. The pyramid is the central feature of a vast mortuary complex in an enormous courtyard surrounded by ceremonial structures and decoration.

The pyramid went through several revisions and redevelopments of the original plan. The pyramid originally stood 62.5 m (205 ft; 119 cu) tall, with a base of 109 m × 121 m (358 ft × 397 ft; 208 cu × 231 cu) and was clad in polished white limestone. However, there is conjecture of measurements between sources. As of 1997, the step pyramid (or proto-pyramid) was considered to be the earliest large-scale cut stone construction, although the nearby enclosure wall "Gisr el-Mudir" is suggested by some Egyptologists to predate the complex.

In March 2020, the pyramid was reopened for visitors after a 14-year restoration that began in 2006. There was an interruption of the work in 2011 after the overthrow of Hosni Mubarak. The renovation cost more than 104 million Egyptian pounds.

Renovations of the Step Pyramid

== Djoser ==
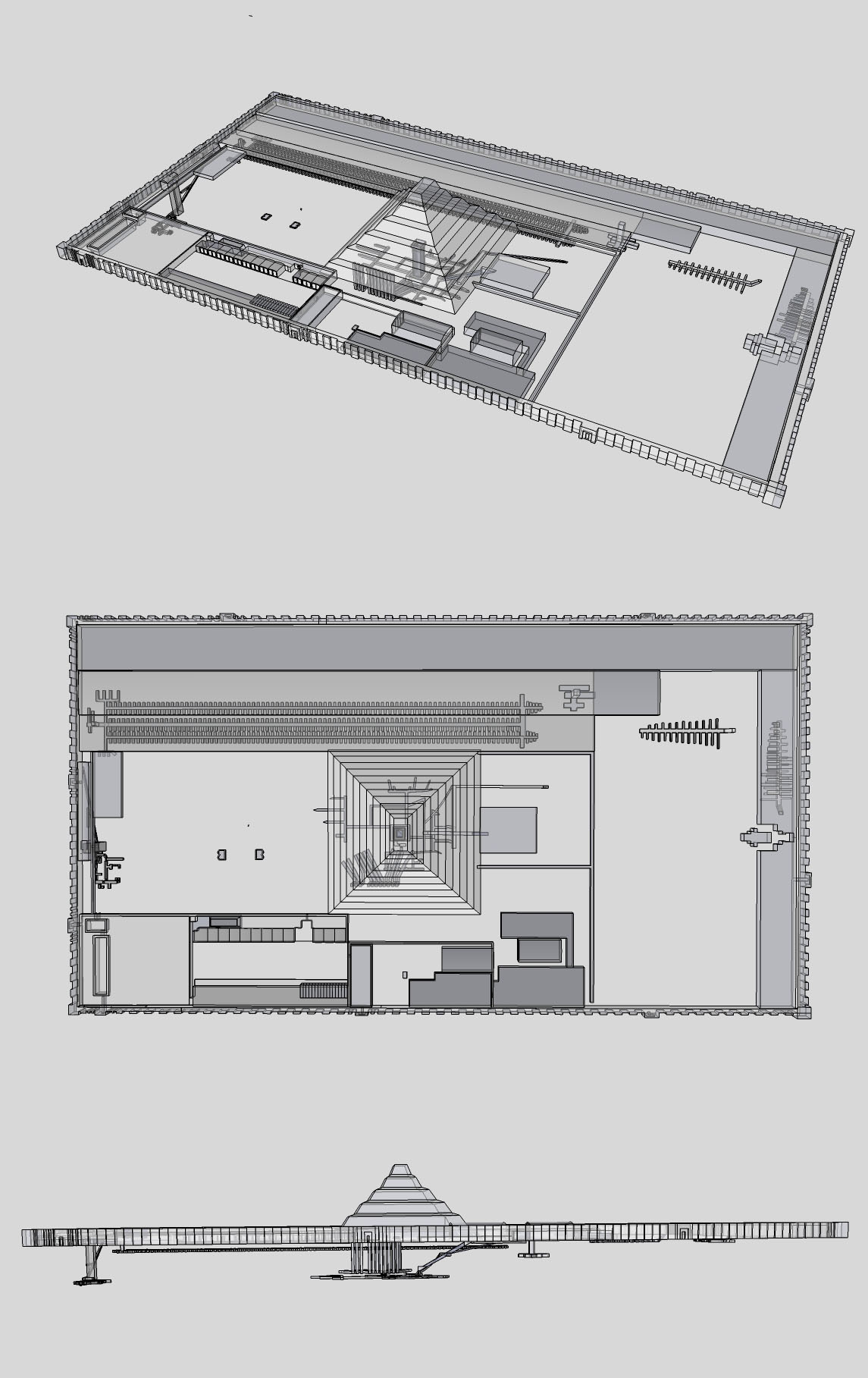
Perspective, plan, and elevation views of a 3D model of the pyramid complex

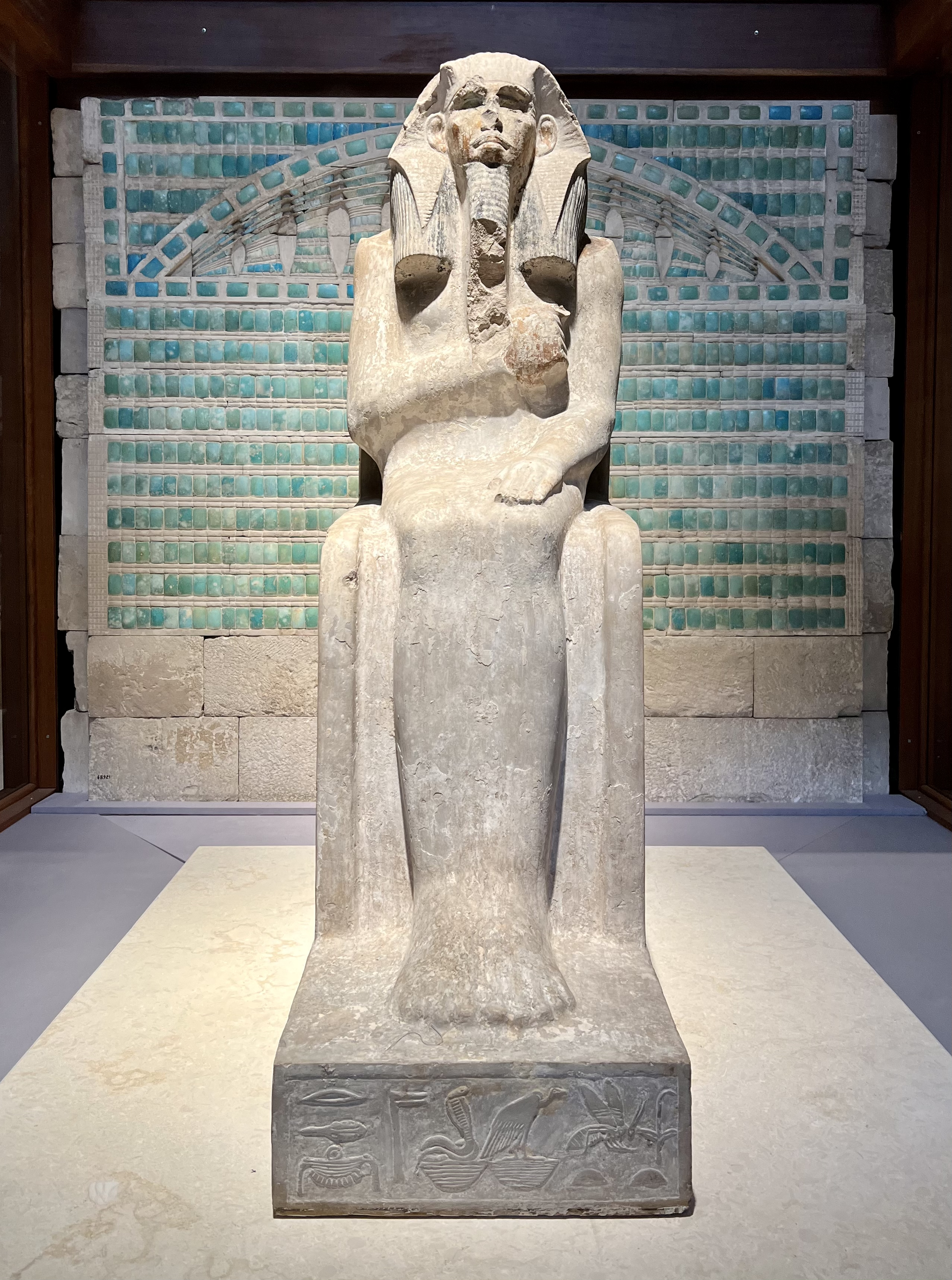
Statue of King Djoser

Djoser was the first or second king of the 3rd Dynasty (c. 2670–2650 BC) of the Old Kingdom of Egypt (c. 2686 – c. 2125 BC). He is believed to have ruled for 19 years or, if the 19 years were biennial taxation years, 38 years. He reigned long enough to allow the grandiose plan for his pyramid to be realized in his lifetime.

Djoser is best known for his innovative tomb, which dominates the Saqqara landscape. In this tomb, he is referred to by his Horus name Netjerikhet; Djoser is a name given by New Kingdom visitors more than a thousand years later. Djoser's step pyramid was a major change from previous architecture. It sets several important precedents, perhaps the most important of which is its status as the first monumental structure made of stone, with previous structures being built from mud-brick.

The social implications of such a large and carefully sculpted stone structure are significant. The process of building such a structure would be far more labor-intensive than previous monuments of mud-brick. This suggests that the state, and therefore the royal government, had a new level of control of resources, both material and human. Also, from this point on, kings of the Old Kingdom are buried in the north, rather than at Abydos.

Although the plan of Djoser's pyramid complex is different from later complexes, many elements persist and the step pyramid sets the stage for later pyramids of the 4th, 5th, and 6th Dynasties, including the great pyramids of Giza. Many Egyptologists credit Djoser's vizier Imhotep with the design and construction of the complex. This is based on the presence of his statue in the funerary complex of Djoser, his title of "overseer of sculptors and painters", and a comment made by the 3rd century BC historian Manetho claiming Imhotep was the "inventor of building in stone". Imhotep would later be deified and known as Asclepios by the Greeks.

== Precedents ==
Djoser's Pyramid draws ideas from several precedents. The most relevant precedent is found at Saqqara mastaba S3038 (c. 2900 BC (Note: The mastaba is thought to be constructed for official Nebetka during the reign of Anedjib, and was found by Walter Bryan Emery in 1937.)). The substructure lay in a 4 m (13 ft) deep rectangular pit, and had mudbrick walls rising to 6 m (20 ft). Three sides were extended and built out to create eight shallow steps rising at an angle of 49°. This would have been an elongated step pyramid if the remaining side had not been left uncovered. In another parallel to Djoser's complex, to complete this mastaba complex a niched enclosure wall was erected.

== Layout ==
Djoser's mortuary complex comprises the great trench, enclosure wall, colonnaded entrance, "T" temple, Sed festival complex, north and south pavilions, south tomb and court, western mounds, mortuary temple, and the crowning feature of it all, the step pyramid with its substructure. The complex was a landmark achievement for Egyptian architecture. It was the advent of the pyramidal form of the royal tomb and the first instance of the mass use of limestone in construction, replacing mudbrick which had been the staple building material prior. This shift to limestone – a hard, dense material compared to mudbrick – presented novel challenges to the architects, though they kept to earlier tradition, copying architectural elements and carving them into the stone. For example, the Egyptians hand-carved 1,680 nine-metre-tall (30 ft; 17 cu) niches out of the limestone enclosure wall. In earlier projects, this element was built with wooden planks, ropes, and poles hung with reed mats. In a modern context, the same element would be built by laying out the blocks to form the recesses.

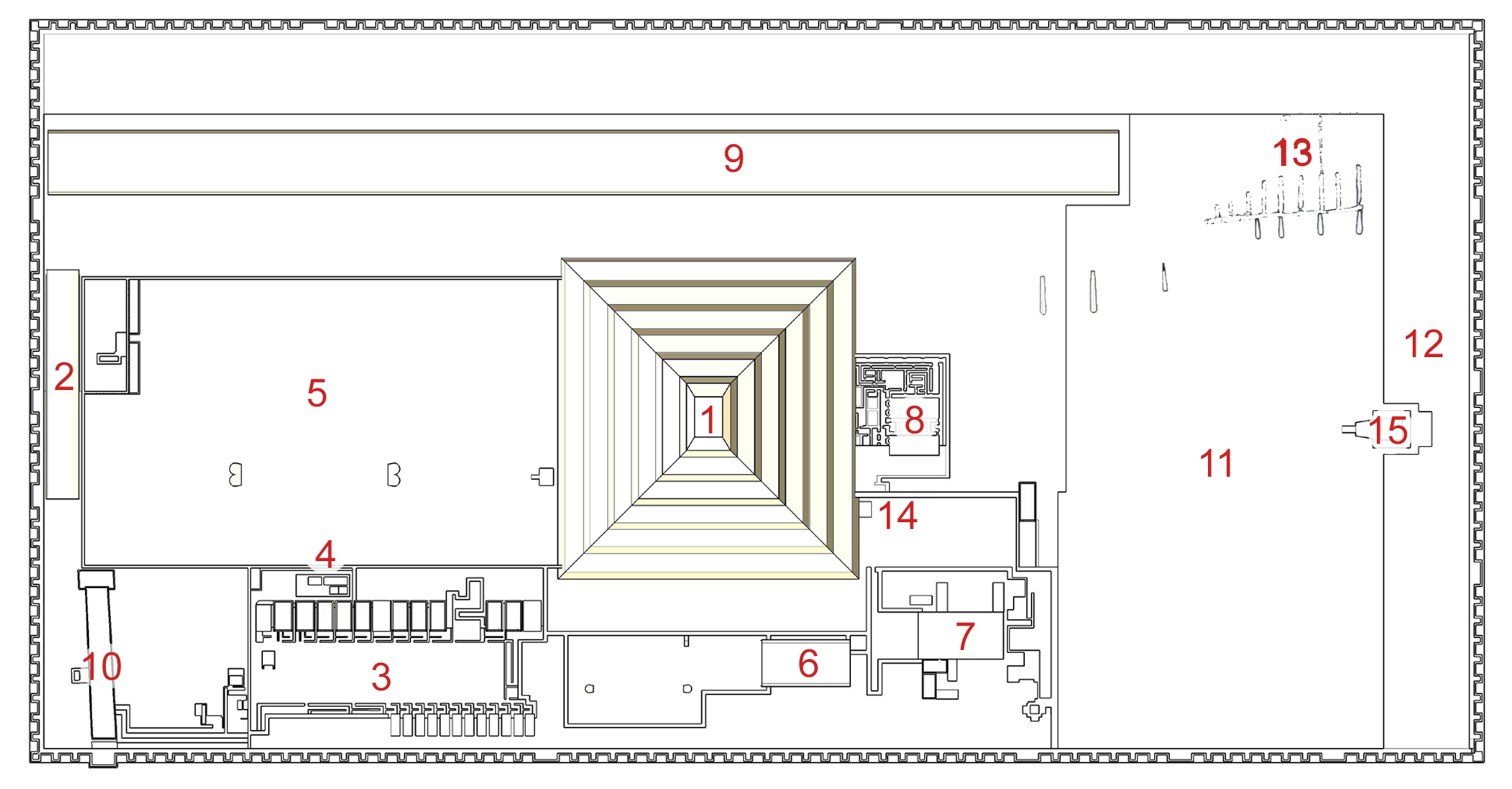
Complex layout: 1) step pyramid, 2) south tomb and chapel, 3) Heb-sed court, 4) 'T' temple, 5) south court, 6) south pavilion, 7) north pavilion, 8) mortuary temple, 9) western mounds, 10) colonnaded entrance, 11) north court, 12) north galleries, 13) step tombs, 14) serdab, and 15) north altar

== Step pyramid ==
Pyramid of Djoser and nearby tombs

The crowning feature of the complex is the Step Pyramid which rises from the Saqqara plateau in six steps to a height between 60 m (200 ft; 110 cu) and 62.5 m (205 ft; 119.3 cu). This element was revised repeatedly in construction, going through a series of developmental phases that culminated in its step pyramidal form. These phases are traditionally labelled, following Jean-Philippe Lauer's excavations: M1, M2, M3, P1, P1', and P2. (Note: There is direct evidence for some of these stages, though others remain hypothetical in nature as confirming or disproving them would require dismantling the pyramid.)

In the early stages (M1 to M3) the structure had the form of a mastaba before alterations (P1 to P2) were made to create its step pyramidal form. In the first stage (M1), the mastaba had a square plan 63 m (207 ft; 120 cu) in length that rose to a height of 8.4 m (28 ft; 16 cu). This was built from a core of limestone blocks arranged in horizontal beds and bound with yellow or red clay. A 2.6-metre-thick (9 ft; 5 cu) casing of fine white Tura limestone was applied to the core arranged in the same horizontal manner. The outer blocks were inclined to ~82° and the top of the mastaba likely had a slightly convex shape. A second casing of fine white limestone was applied to this which increased the mastaba's base length to 71.5 m (235 ft; 136 cu) square (M2). The casing was 4.2 m (14 ft; 8 cu) thick at the base and 3.4 m (11 ft; 6.5 cu) thick at the peak and was about 0.525 m (2 ft; 1 cu) lower than the initial mastaba height. The outer blocks of this second coat also had a slightly less vertical incline at ~76°. The mastaba was then extended 8.4 m (28 ft; 16 cu) east to cover a series of eleven shafts 33 m (108 ft; 63 cu) deep that ended in passages that led west to the burial chambers of members of Djoser's family. This extension was built from locally sourced limestone rubble and cased by 1.5-metre-thick (5 ft; 3 cu) limestone coating that formed an extension of M2. The mastaba had a new, rectangular ground plan 71.5 m (235 ft; 136 cu) by 79.5 m (261 ft; 152 cu). At this stage the mastaba still peaked at 8.4 m (28 ft; 16 cu) in height, too short to be seen from outside the 10.5-metre-high (34 ft; 20 cu) enclosure wall.

Egyptologists are split on the motivations behind the conception of the pyramidal form that the mastaba was converted into. Lauer believed that the alteration was made to have the tomb visible from Memphis. The fact of the mastaba's square plan led Rainer Stadelmann, however, to suggest that it was never the intended final form and that it was planned to be a pyramid from the outset. The conversion (P1) encased the mastaba (M3) extending its length by 5.76 m (19 ft; 11 cu) on each axis giving it a base length of 85.5 m (281 ft; 163 cu) by 77 m (253 ft; 147 cu). The alteration from mastaba to pyramid came with a shift in construction. The builders used larger and better quality, roughly dressed limestone blocks – but instead of horizontal beds, they built successive inclined accretion layers 2–3 m (6.6–9.8 ft) thick. These leaned on each other from opposite ends providing greater stability preventing a collapse. The whole was then cased in fine white limestone with a layer of packing in between. This phase of the pyramid had four steps that rose to a height of 42 m (138 ft; 80 cu). The decision was then made to expand the pyramid north and west from four to six steps (P1') which was then finished with a final layer of limestone casing (P2) that gave the pyramid its final form. On completion the step pyramid had a base length of 109 m (358 ft; 208 cu) by 121 m (397 ft; 231 cu) that rose to a height of 60–62.5 m (197–205 ft; 115–119 cu) and occupied a volume of 330,400 m^{3} (11,670,000 ft^{3}).

Much of the rock for the pyramid was likely quarried from the construction of the great trench. It is widely accepted that ramps would have been used to raise heavy stone to construct the pyramid, and many plausible models have been suggested. For transport, apparatuses like rollers were used in which the heavy stone could be placed and then rolled.

Developmental phases of Djoser's step pyramid
	Mastaba M1	Mastaba M2	Mastaba M3	Pyramid P1	Pyramid P1'	Pyramid P2
Base dimensions	63 m (207 ft; 120 cu)	71.5 m (235 ft; 136 cu)	71.5 m (235 ft; 136 cu); 79.5 m (261 ft; 152 cu)	77 m (253 ft; 147 cu); 85.5 m (281 ft; 163 cu)	108 m (354 ft; 206 cu); 120 m (394 ft; 229 cu)	109 m (358 ft; 208 cu); 121 m (397 ft; 231 cu)
Height	8.4 m (28 ft; 16 cu)	8.4 m (28 ft; 16 cu); ~7.9 m (26 ft; 15 cu)	8.4 m (28 ft; 16 cu); ~7.9 m (26 ft; 15 cu); ~6.3 m (21 ft; 12 cu)	42 m (138 ft; 80 cu)	60 m (197 ft; 115 cu) to 62.5 m (205 ft; 119 cu)	60 m (197 ft; 115 cu) to 62.5 m (205 ft; 119 cu)
Masonry blocks	0.3 m (0.98 ft)	0.3 m (0.98 ft)	0.3 m (0.98 ft)	0.38 m (1.2 ft)	0.38 m (1.2 ft)	0.5 m (1.6 ft) to 0.52 m (1.7 ft)
Volume						330,400 m^{3} (11,670,000 ft^{3})
Method of construction	Horizontal beds	Horizontal beds	Horizontal beds	Inclined layers	Inclined layers	Inclined layers
Number of steps	–	–	–	4	6	6

== Pyramid substructure ==
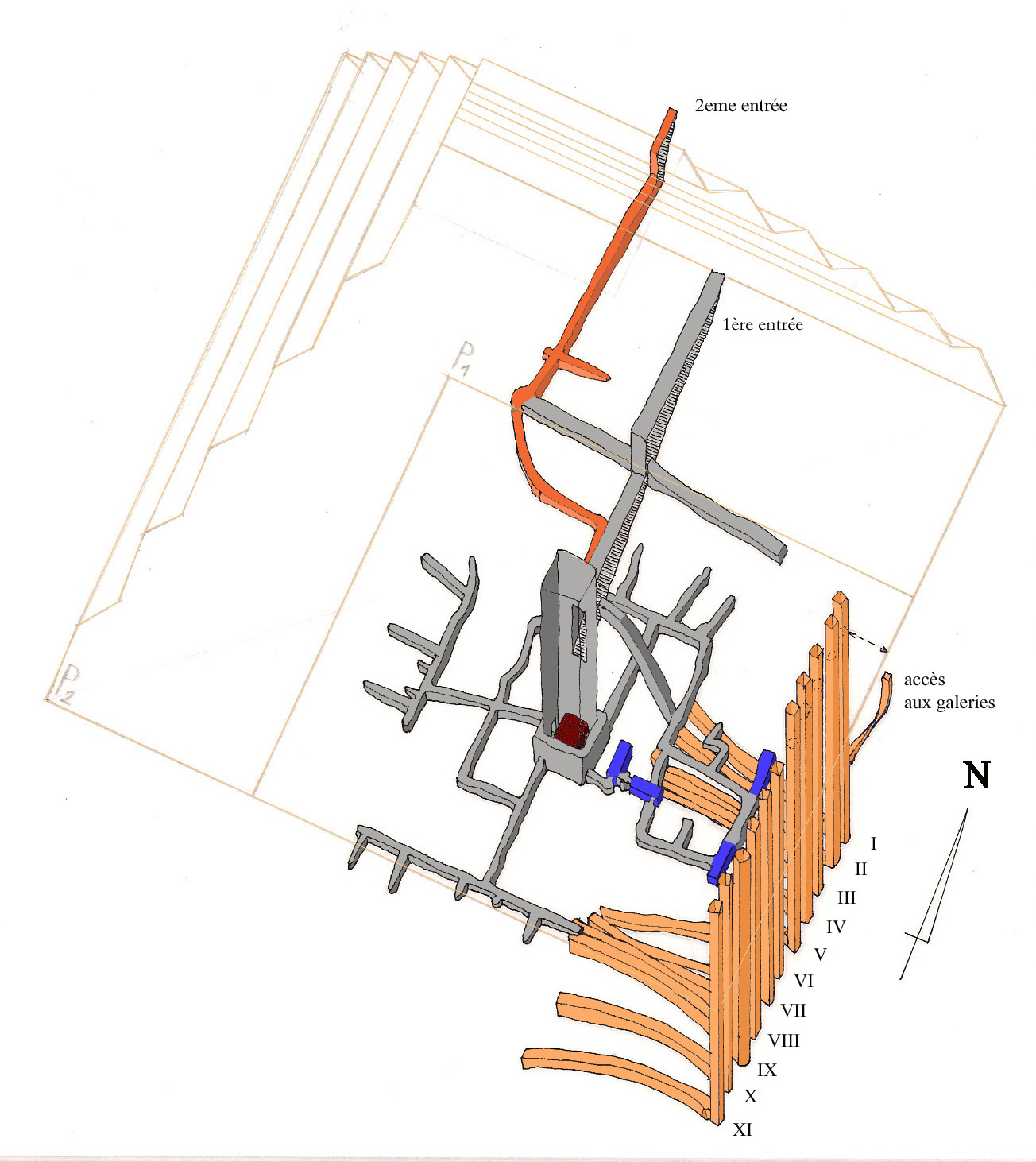
Substructure of the pyramid: main shaft and galleries in gray, burial chamber in dark red, blue-tiled galleries in blue, eastern shafts I–XI in orange, second entrance in light red

Under the step pyramid is a labyrinth of tunneled chambers and galleries that total nearly 6 km in length and connect to a central shaft 7 m square and 28 m deep. These spaces provide room for the king's burial, the burial of family members, and the storage of goods and offerings. The entrance to the 28 m shaft was built on the north side of the pyramid, a trend that would remain throughout the Old Kingdom. The sides of the underground passages are limestone inlaid with blue faience tile to replicate reed matting. These "palace facade" walls are further decorated by panels decorated in low relief that show the king participating in the Heb-sed. Together these chambers constitute the funerary apartment that mimicked the palace and would serve as the living place of the royal ka.

On the east side of the pyramid, eleven shafts 32 m deep were constructed and annexed to horizontal tunnels for royal family members. These were incorporated into the pre-existing substructure as it expanded eastward. In the storerooms along here over 40,000 stone vessels were found, many of which predate Djoser. These would have served Djoser's visceral needs in the afterlife. An extensive network of underground galleries was located to the north, west and south of the central burial chamber and crude horizontal magazines were carved into these. Shafts I–V were used for the burials of royal family members; shafts VI–XI were used as symbolic tombs for the grave goods of royal ancestors from dynasties I–II. More than 40,000 vessels, bowls and vases made of various kinds of stone were found in these galleries. Royal names such as of kings Den, Semerkhet, Nynetjer and Sekhemib were incised on the pots. It is now thought that Djoser once restored the original tombs of the ancestors, and then sealed the grave goods in the galleries in an attempt to save them.

=== Burial chamber ===
The burial chamber was a vault constructed of four courses of well-dressed granite. It had one opening, which was sealed with a 3.5 ton block after the burial. No body was recovered as the tomb had been extensively robbed. Lauer believes that a burial chamber of alabaster existed before the one of granite. He found evidence of limestone blocks with five pointed stars in low relief that were likely on the ceiling, indicating the first occurrence of what would become a tradition. The king sought to associate himself with the eternal North Stars that never set so as to ensure his rebirth and eternity.

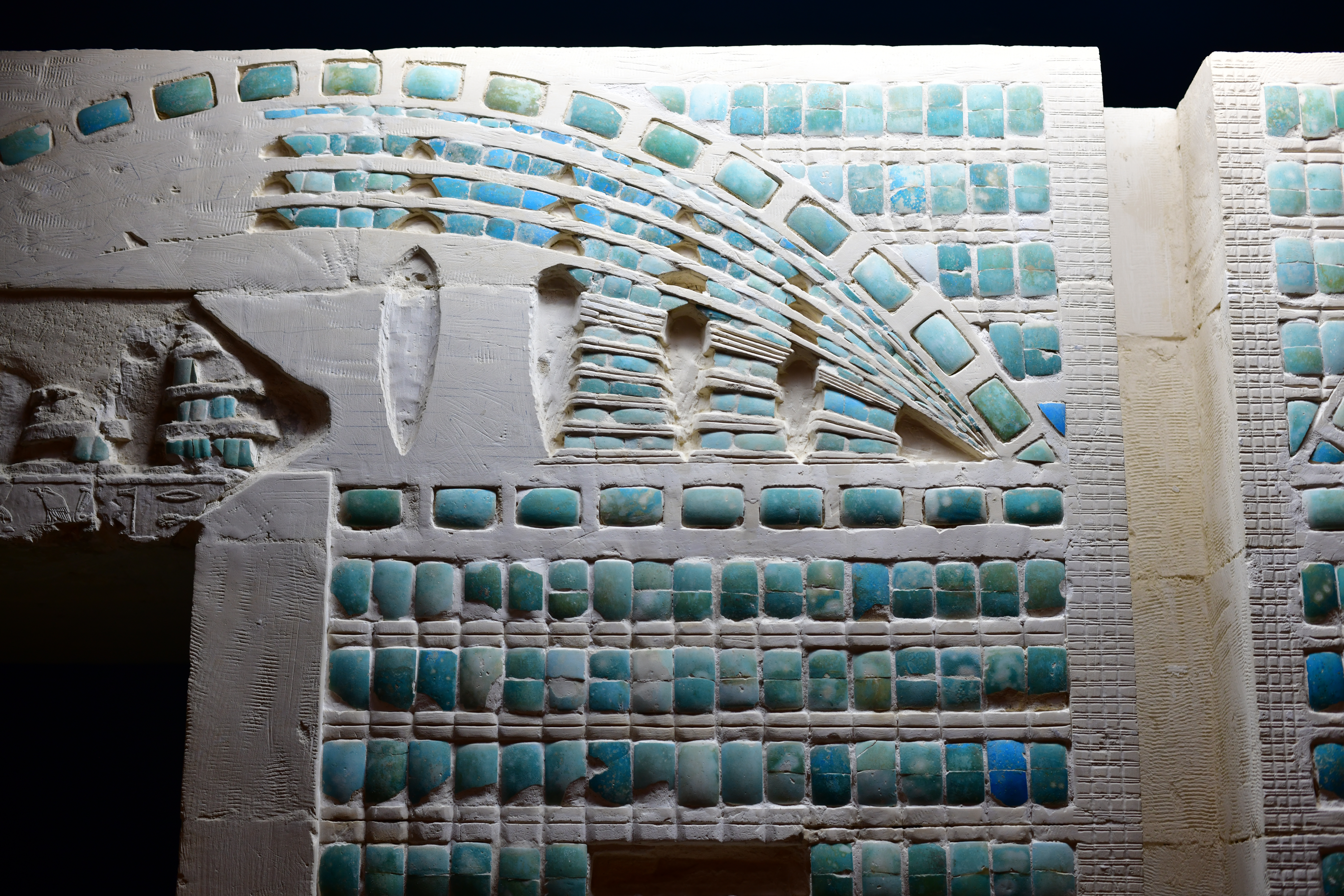
Elaborate blue faience inlays from the pyramid substructure

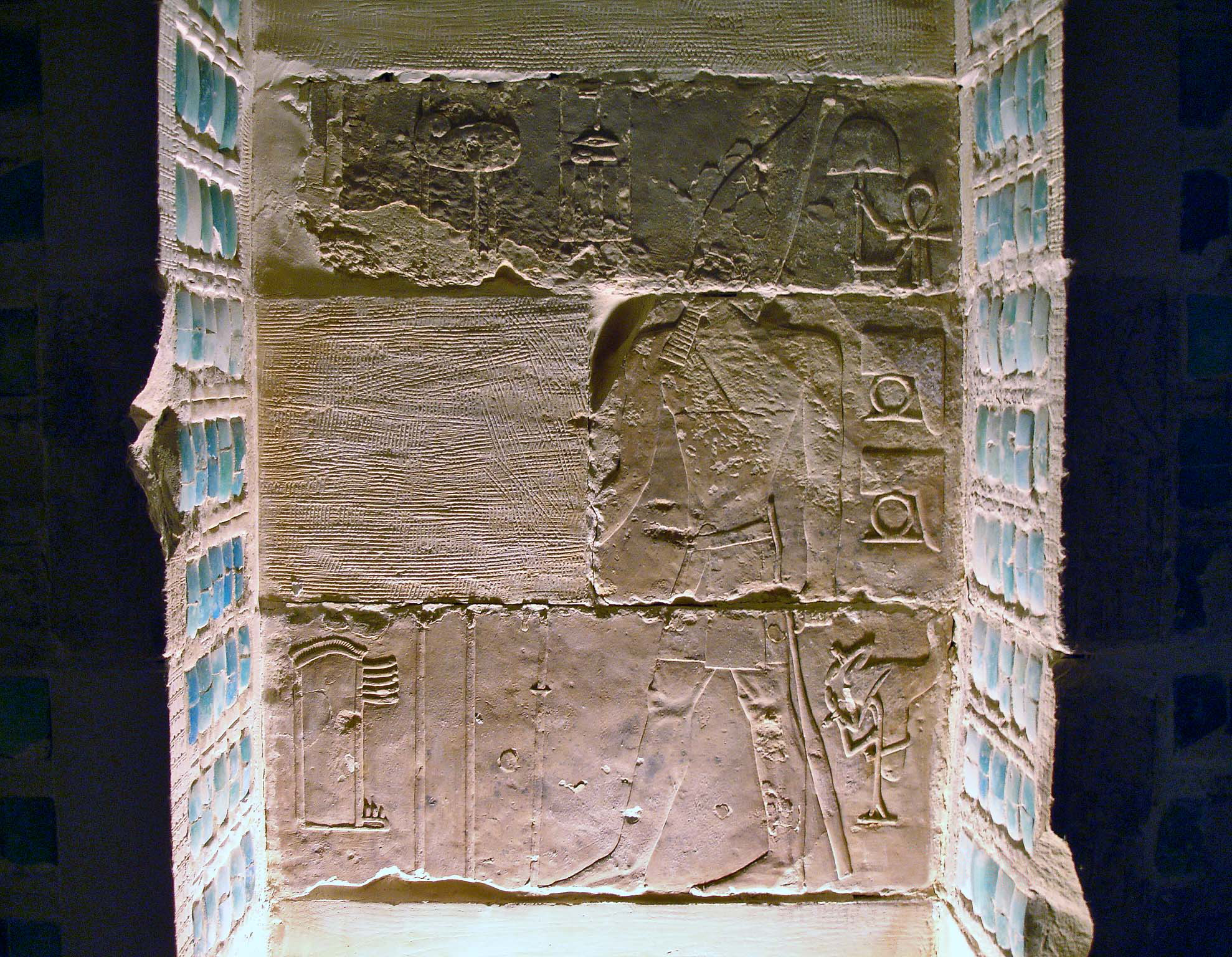
Relief from the blue faience chambers depicting Djoser at a shrine of Horus of Behedet (Note: Though in later ages Behedet became associated with modern Edfu, Renée Friedman (1995, p. 20) points out that in Djoser's era it may not have represented a specific place.)

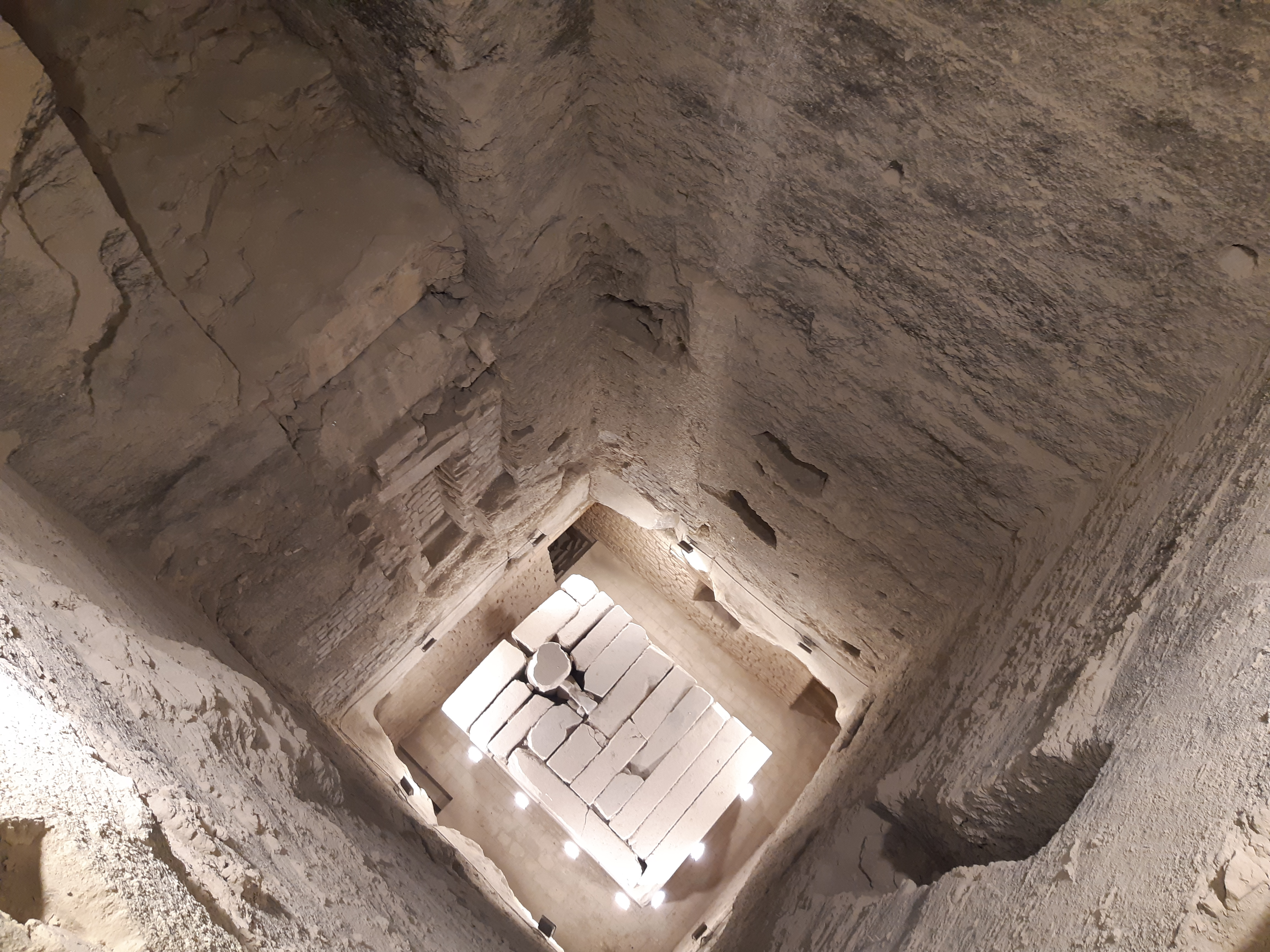
Burial chamber of Djoser, with granite sarcophagus.

== Pyramid complex ==
Djoser's Step Pyramid complex included several structures pivotal to its function in both life and the afterlife. A pyramid was not simply a grave in ancient Egypt. Its purpose was to facilitate a successful afterlife for the king so that he could be eternally reborn. The symbolism of the step pyramid form, which did not survive beyond the 3rd Dynasty, is unknown, but it has been suggested that it may be a monumental symbol of the crown, especially the royal mortuary cult, since seven small step pyramids (that were not tombs) were built in the provinces. Another well accepted theory is that it facilitated the king's ascension to join the eternal North Star. (Note: Because of the precession of Earth's axis, in Djoser's time (around 4,700 years ago) the "North Star" was not Polaris (Alpha Ursae Minoris) as it is today, but Thuban (Alpha Draconis).)

The main modern excavator of the Step Pyramid was Jean-Philippe Lauer, a French architect who reconstructed key portions of the complex. The complex covers 15 ha (37 acres) and is about 2.5 times as large as the Old Kingdom town of Hierakonpolis. Several features of the complex differ from those of later Old Kingdom pyramids. The pyramid temple is situated at the north side of the pyramid, whereas in later pyramids it is on the east side. Also, the Djoser complex is built on a north–south axis, whereas later complexes utilize an east–west axis. Furthermore, the Djoser complex has one niched enclosure wall, whereas later pyramids have two enclosure walls with the outside one being smooth and the inside one sometimes niched.

Reconstruction of the Djoser pyramid complex

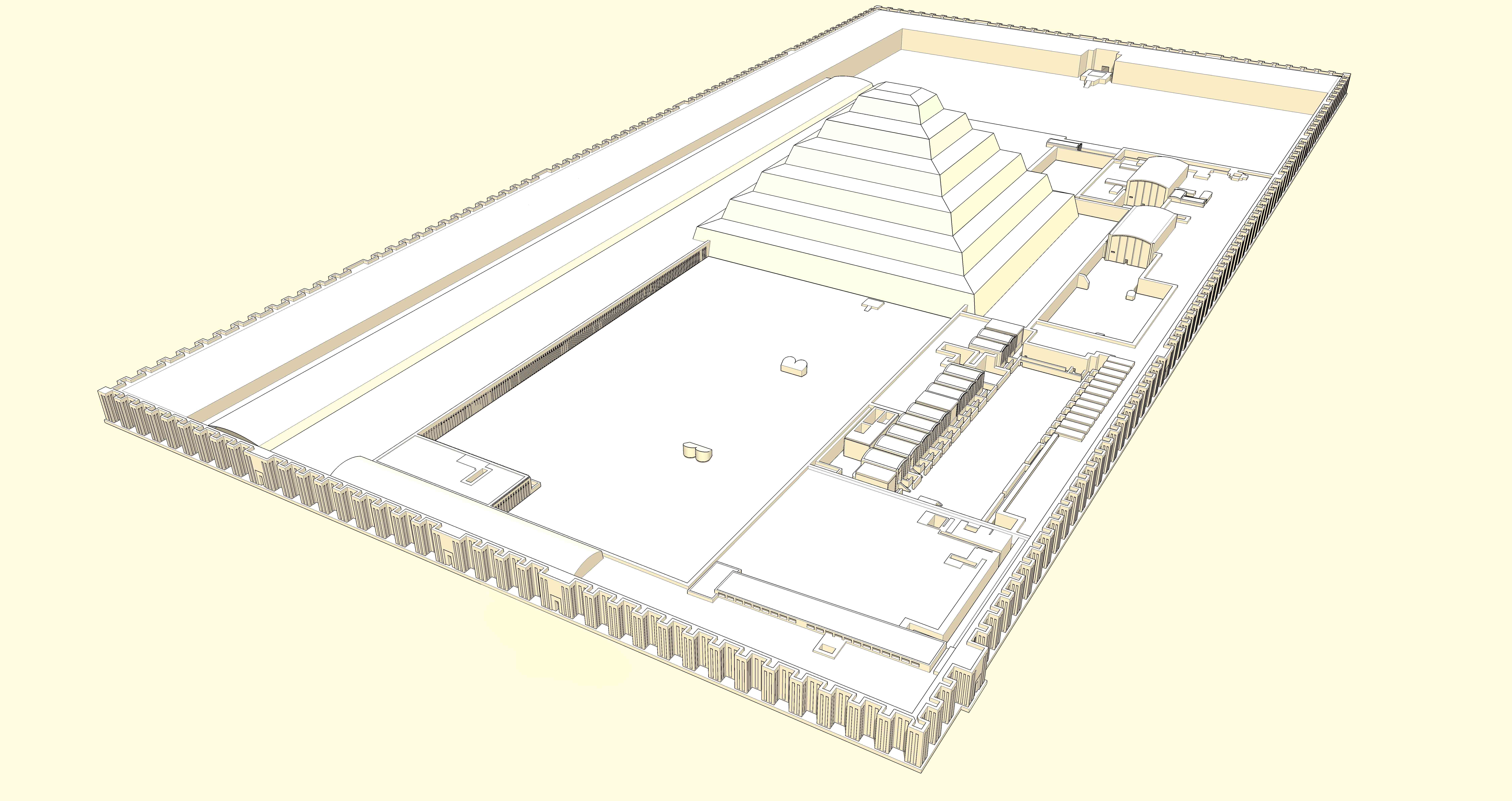
View looking northwest

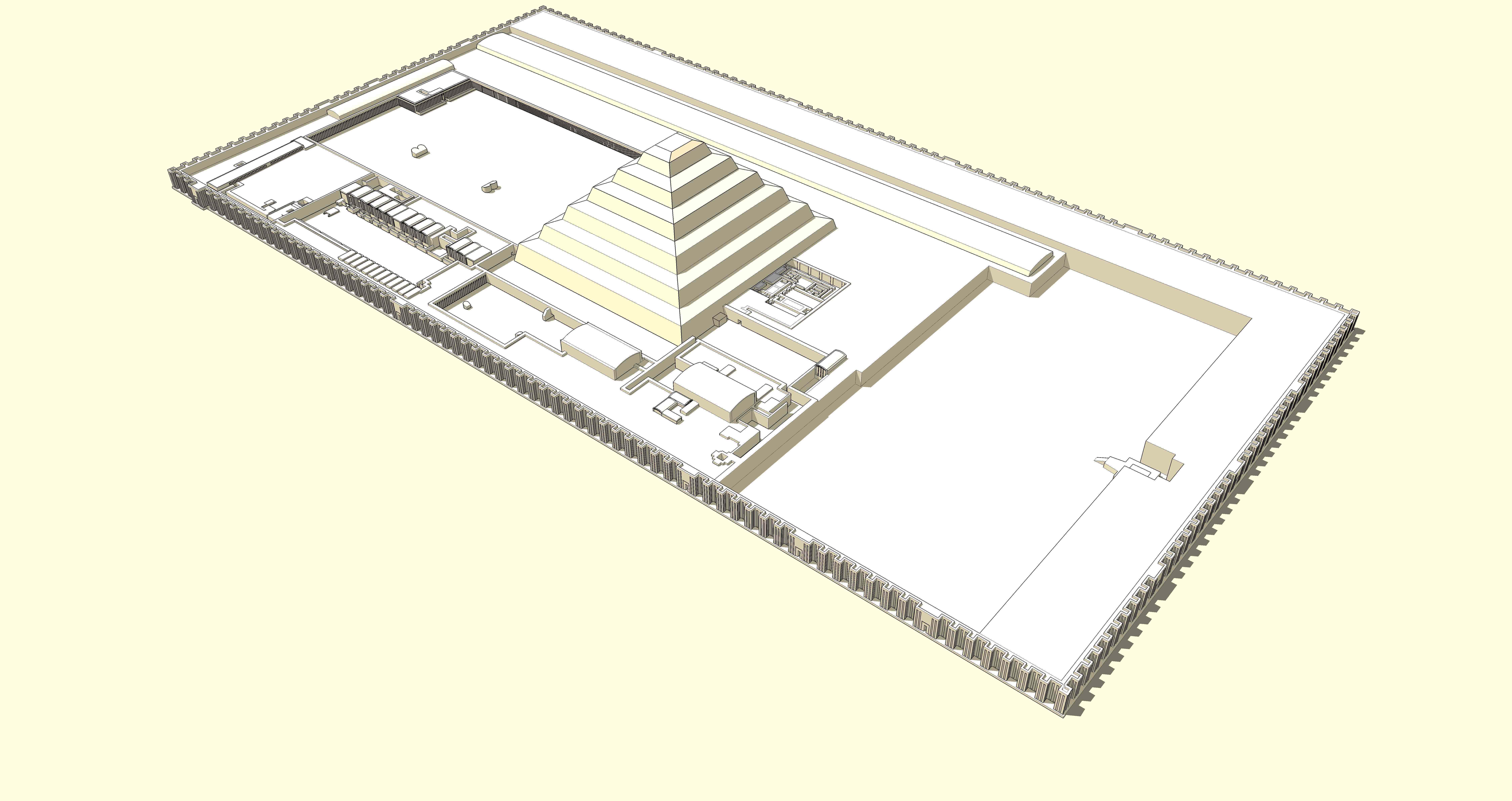
View looking southwest

=== Great trench ===
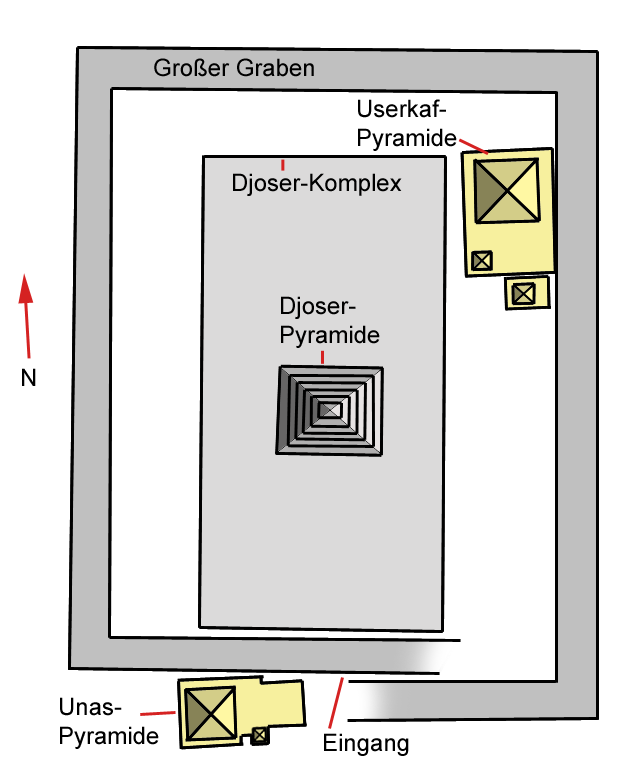
Location of the great trench. (5th Dynasty structures shown in yellow.)

Outside the enclosure wall, Djoser's pyramid complex is surrounded by a trench dug into the underlying rock. At 750 m (2,460 ft; 1,430 cu) long from north to south and 40 m (130 ft; 76 cu) wide, the trench is the largest structure of this kind in the Memphis necropolis. It is rectangular in shape, oriented on the north–south axis. The trench resembles a 𓉔 (hieroglyph h) which represents the floor plan of a house. It is decorated with niches which are suggested by Nabil Swelim to have hosted the spirits of members of the king's court, there to serve the king in his afterlife. In parts, the trench doubles into two with distinct entries. These make accessing the enclosure wall more difficult, indicating its function as a safe-guard. Miroslav Verner suspects that a single entrance was built at the south-east corner granting access to the area.

=== Enclosure wall ===
The complex is enclosed by a wall 10.5 m (34 ft) high that stretched for over 1.6 km (0.99 mi). This wall was built from a thick core of masonry that was encased with Tura limestone, wholly on the outside but partially on the inside. The external façade of the wall had a bastion at a regular interval of 4.1 m (13 ft) adorned with 1,680 hand-carved niches 9 m (30 ft) tall. Fourteen of these bastions were larger than the rest. These hosted false double-doors, while a fifteenth situated in the south-east corner of the east façade held the real entrance. The entrance was flanked by two towers leading to a passage past which lay the colonnaded entrance.

The enclosure wall design recalls the appearance of First Dynasty tombs, such as those found directly north of the complex and at Abydos. Alan Spencer compares the design to the panelled construction of the palace façade, which imitates bound bundles of reeds. Jean-Philippe Lauer suggests that the wall was modelled after the "White Walls" of Memphis, though Miroslav Verner notes that the presence of so many doors renders this unlikely. Hermann Kees thought the 15 doors were related to the sed festival and indicated its duration as being half a lunar month. The remaining doors are known as false doors, and were meant for the king's use in the afterlife. They functioned as portals through which the king's ka could pass between life and the afterlife.

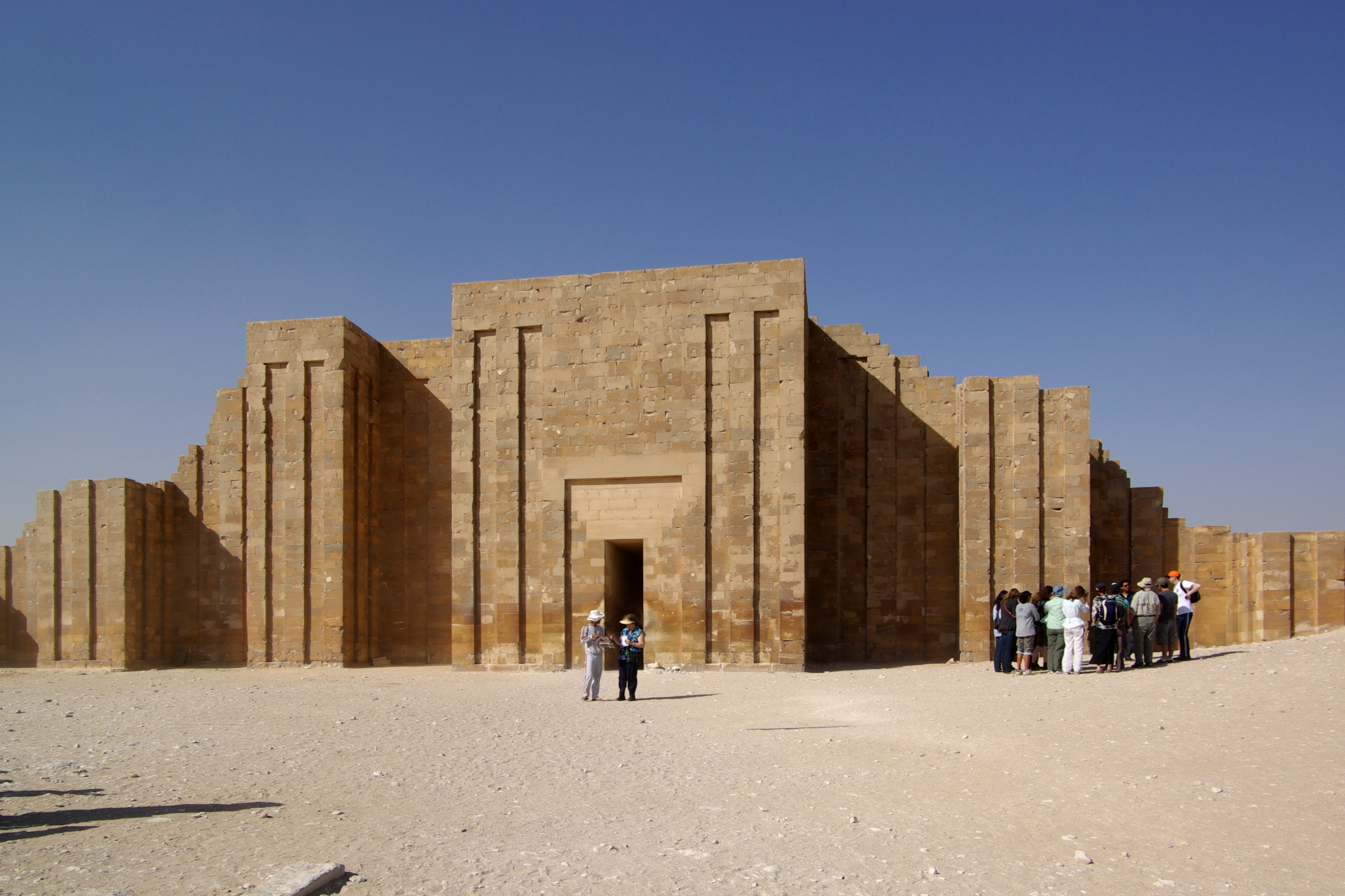
Enclosure wall, with entrance bastion in center

Entrance bastion, with the pyramid in the background

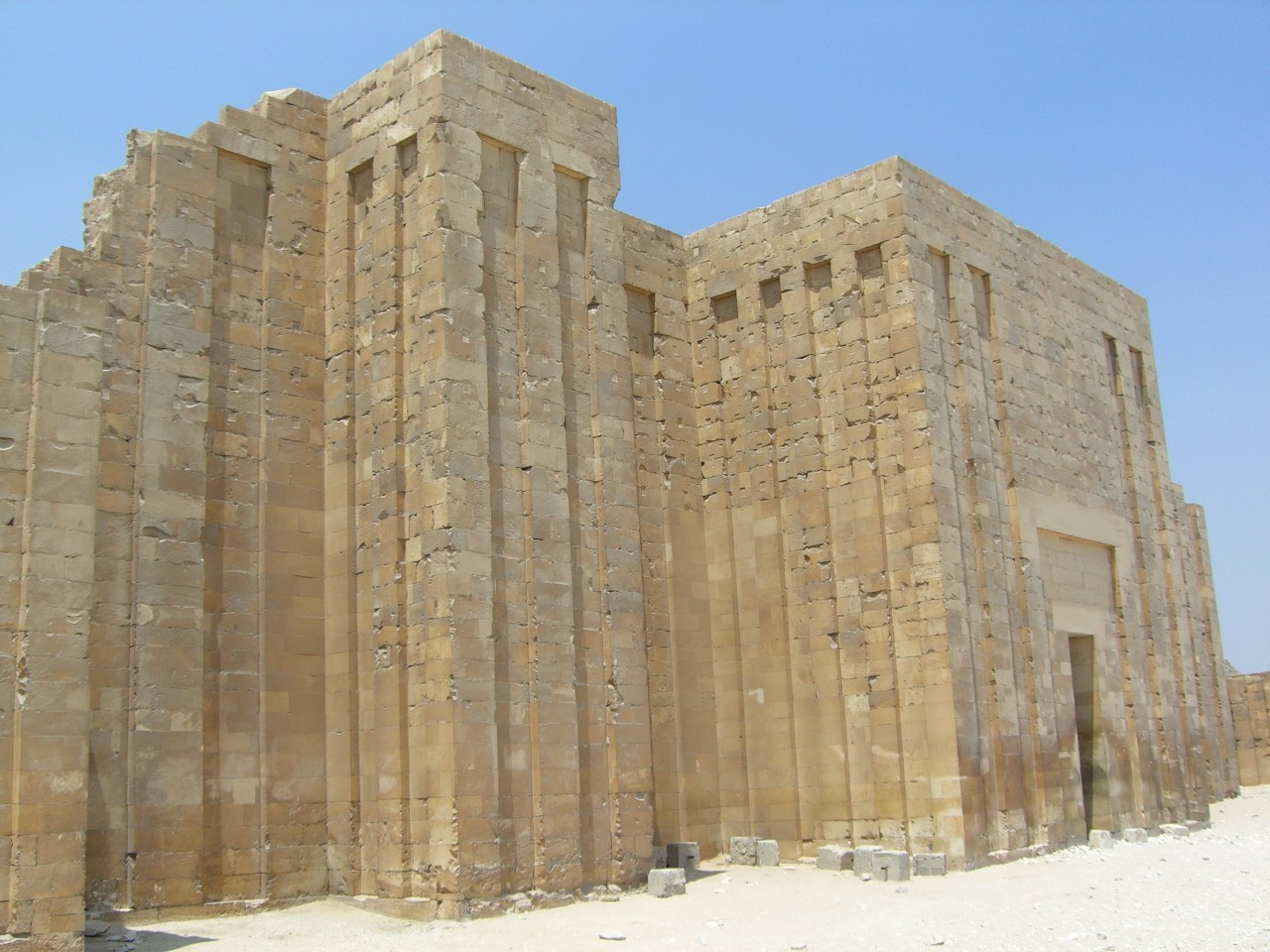
The bastions with hand-carved recesses

=== Entrance colonnade ===
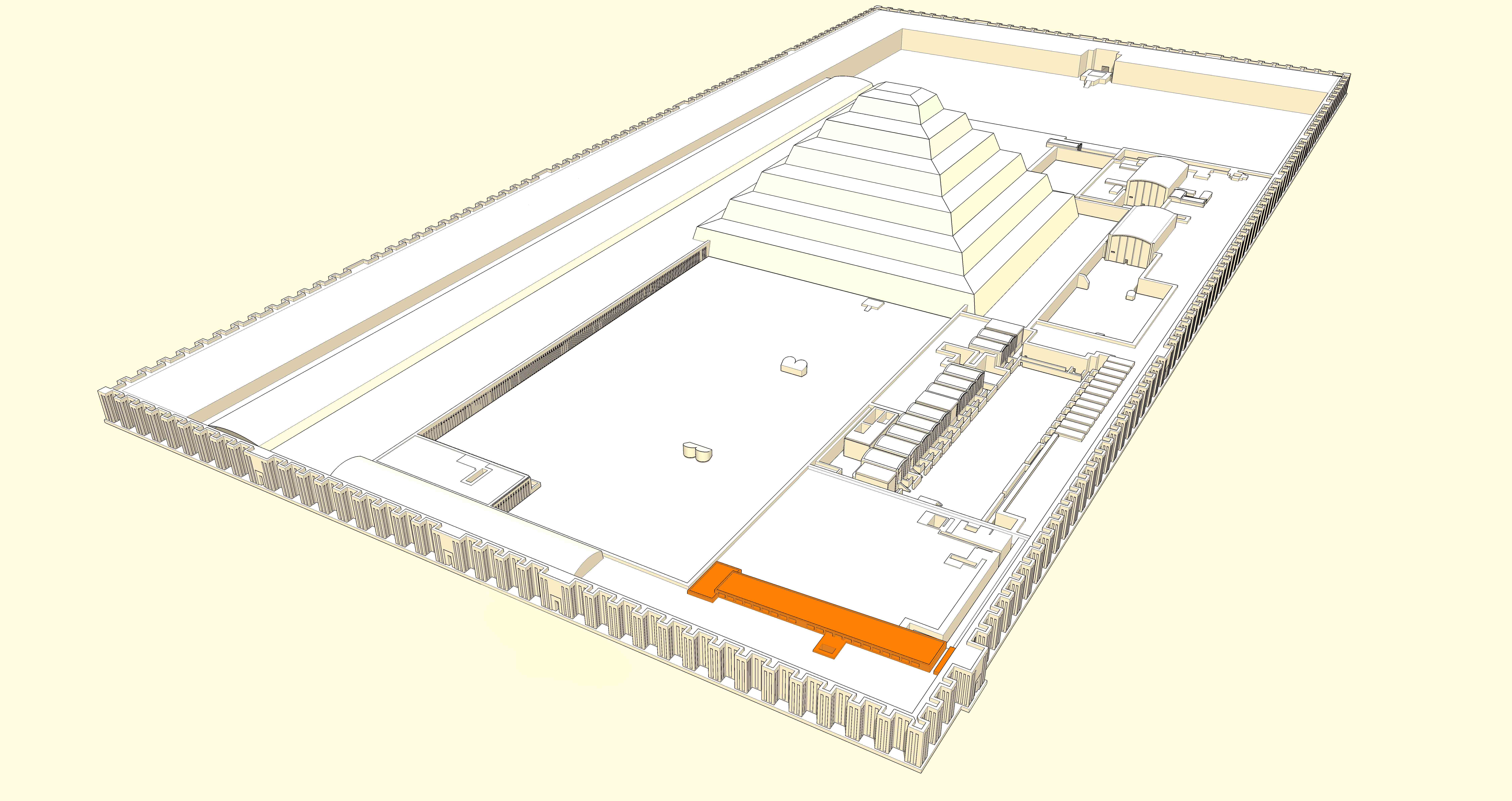
Location of the entrance colonnade

The entrance colonnade led from the enclosure wall to the south court of the complex. It comprises two distinct passageways oriented approximately east–west. (Note: The corridor is oriented slightly to the south-west.) The first is a narrow 1.05 m (3.4 ft) wide by 6 m (20 ft) long corridor cut into the enclosure walls bastion. The ceiling blocks here were carved into the shape of tree trunks. This is followed by a wider corridor flanked by 40 limestone columns, arranged in pairs, that fronted projecting walls, which formed alcoves. The columns were each nearly 6 m (20 ft) tall and were fashioned to resemble bundled reeds that had between seventeen and nineteen ribs. They supported a limestone ceiling whose blocks carved again into the form of palm tree trunks. There are 24 alcoves which are suggested to have held statues of the king or perhaps, because of their number, a double statue of the king and a nome deity. Such statues are present in the monuments of the 4th Dynasty, but no trace of them has been uncovered at Djoser's complex. The end walls of the alcoves had slits cut into them near the ceiling thus allow light to filter in. Near the beginning of the colonnade, at its eastern end, is a corridor which leads to the heb-sed court. Between the twelfth and thirteenth alcove is a "transverse vestibule" with a passage flanked by eight 5 m (16 ft) tall columns and cross-walls leading to a sanctuary. Lauer believes this chamber contained a statue of Djoser on a pedestal that bore his name and Imhotep's titles. The torso and base of this statue were found in the entrance colonnade. The west wall of the entrance colonnade has the form of an open door which leads into the south court.

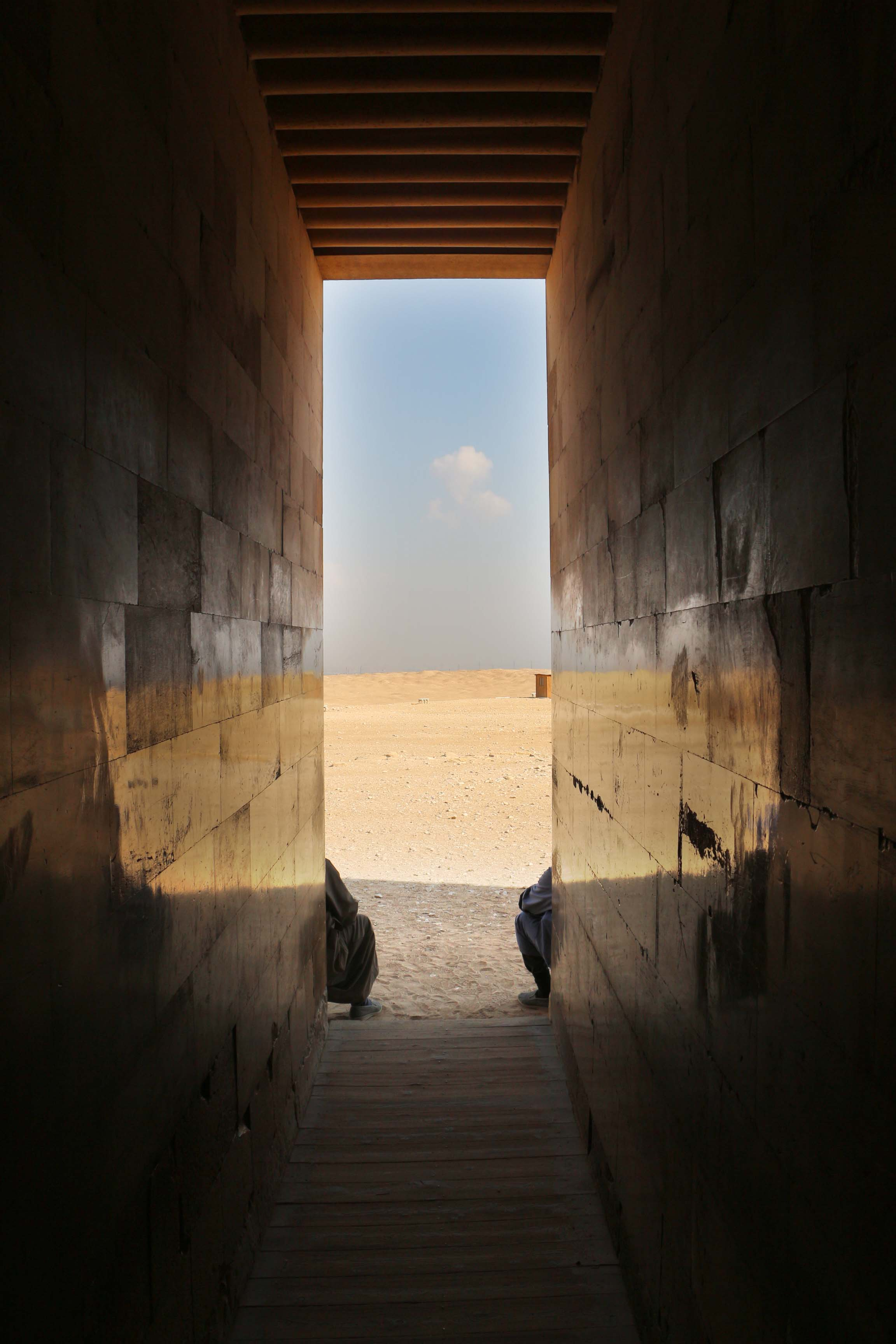
Enclosure wall corridor, looking eastward

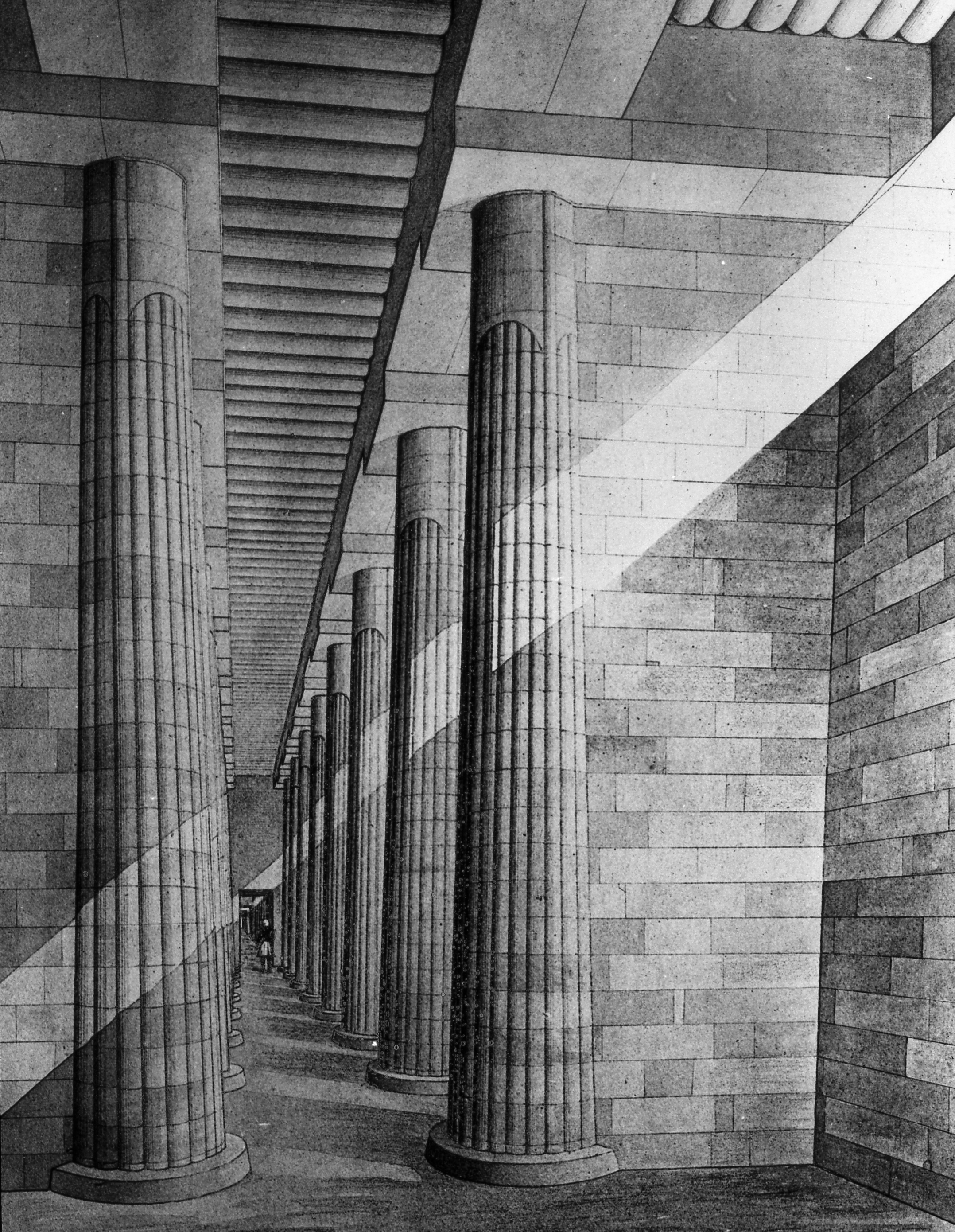
Artist's conception of the colonnade as it originally looked

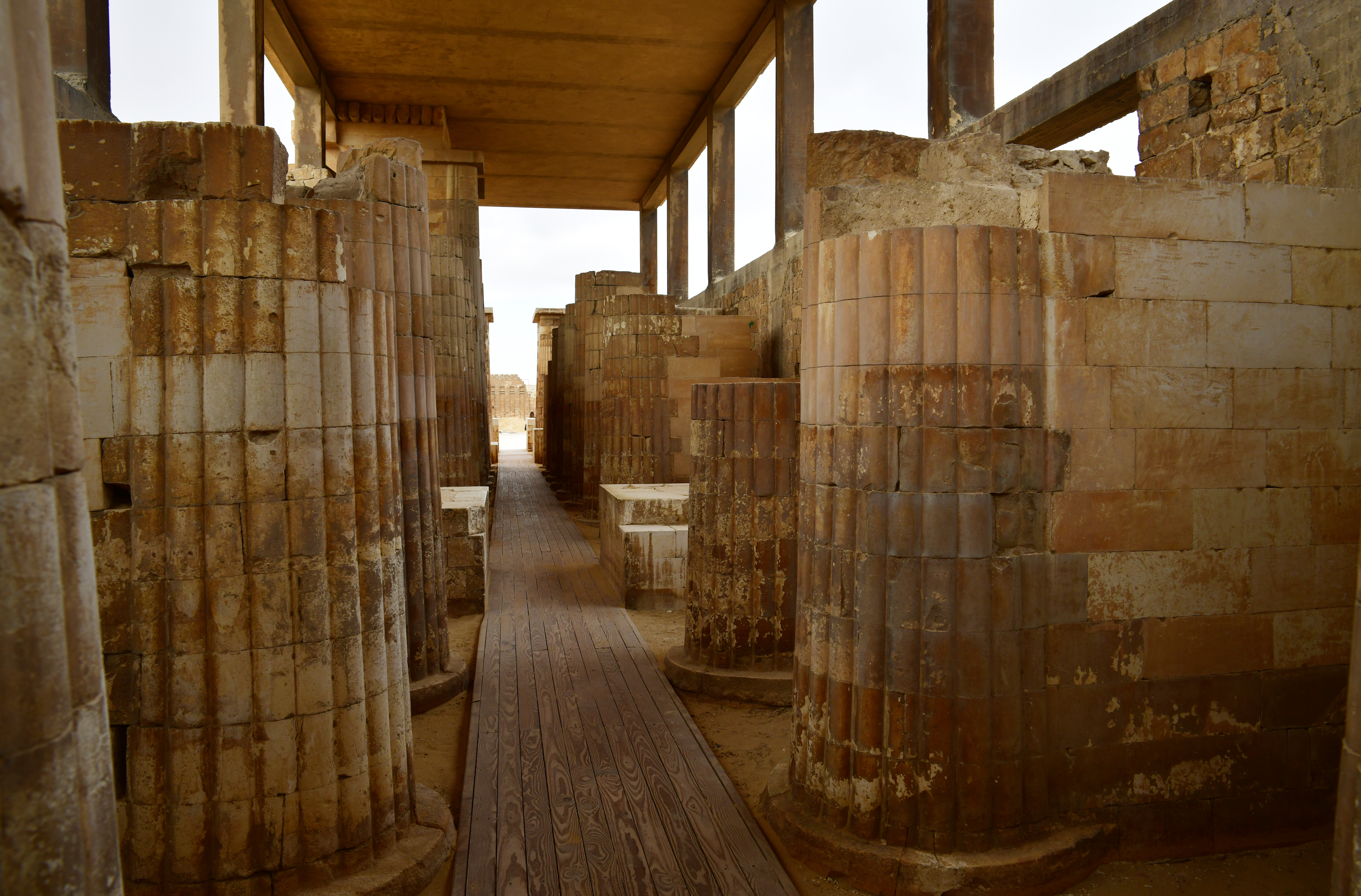
Colonnaded corridor, looking west toward the south court

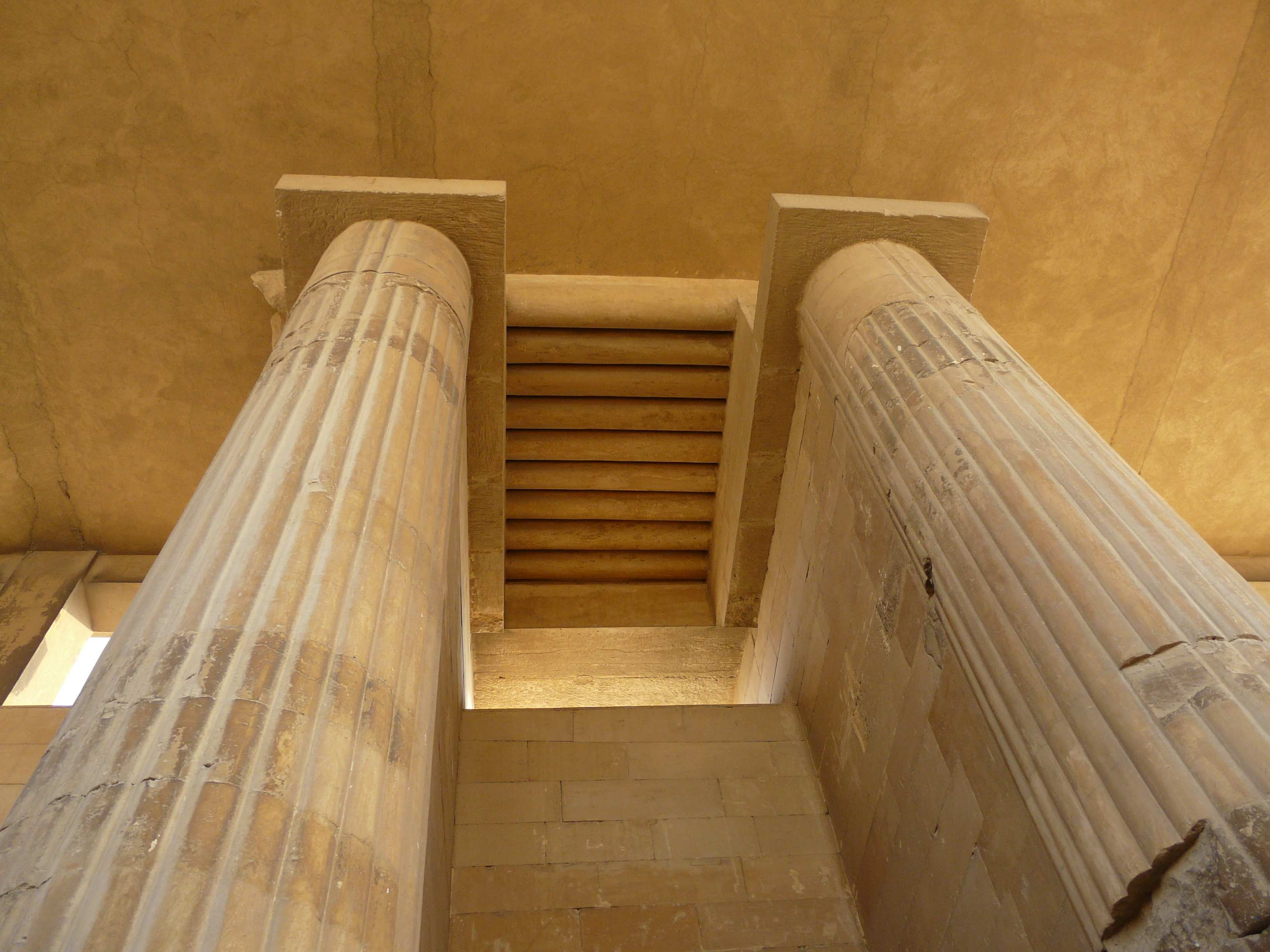
Alcove between the colonnade columns with part of the original ceiling

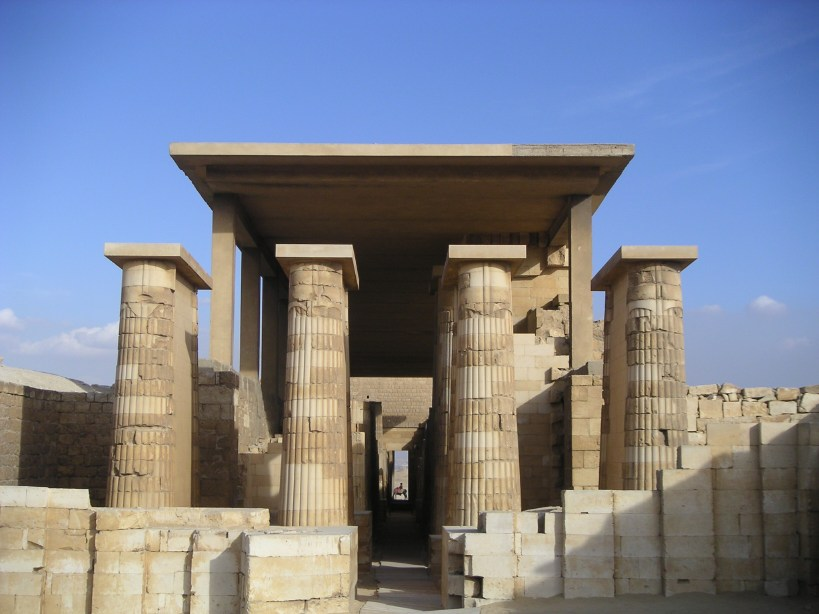
West end of the colonnade, viewed from the south court

=== South court ===
The south court is a large court between the south tomb and the pyramid. Within the court are curved stones thought to be territorial markers associated with the Heb-sed festival, an important ritual completed by Egyptian kings (typically after 30 years on the throne) to renew their powers. These would have allowed Djoser to claim control over all of Egypt, while its presence in the funerary complex would allow Djoser to continue to benefit from the ritual in the afterlife. At the southern end of the court was a platform approached by steps. It has been suggested that this was a platform for the double throne. This fits into the theory proposed by Barry Kemp, and generally accepted by many, that suggests the whole step pyramid complex symbolizes the royal palace enclosure and allows the king to eternally perform the rituals associated with kingship. At the very south of the South Court lay the South Tomb.

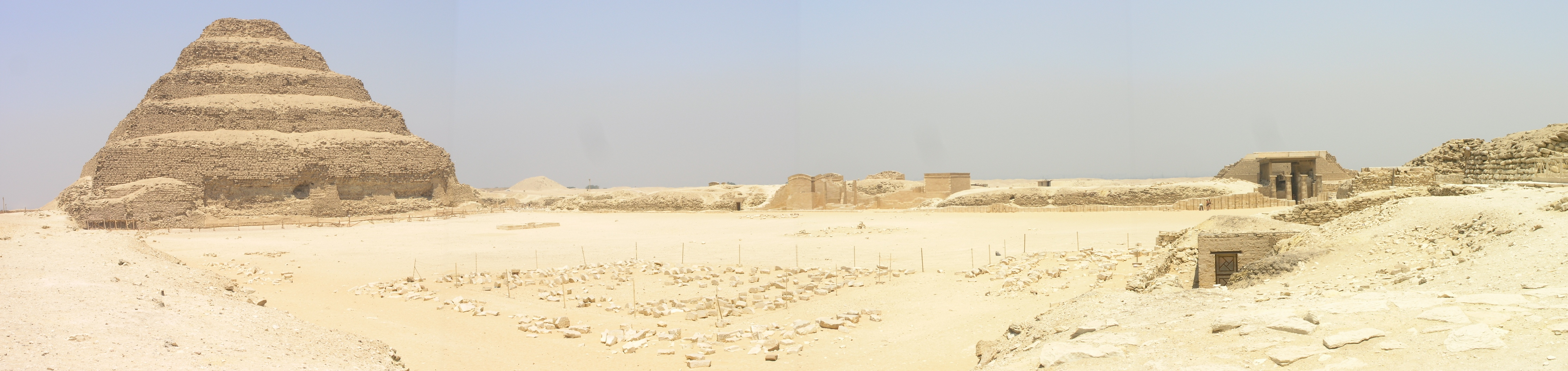
Panorama of the south court with Step Pyramid (left), the Heb-sed court chapels (middle), and the entrance colonnade and the south tomb (right).

=== South tomb ===
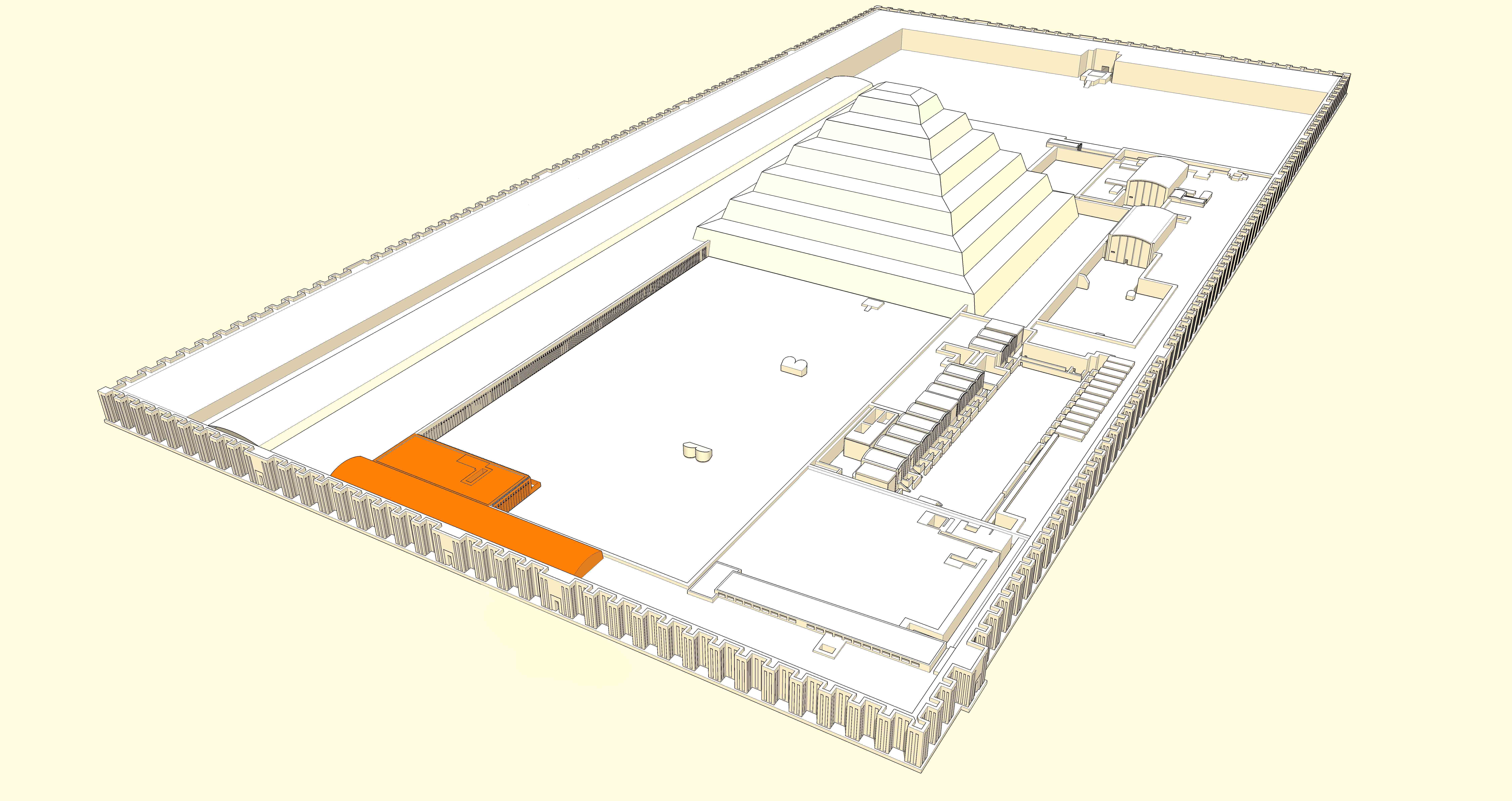
Location of the south tomb

The south tomb has been likened to the satellite pyramids of later dynasties, and has been proposed to house the ka in the afterlife. Another proposal is that it may have held the canopic jar with the king's organs, but this does not follow later trends where the canopic jar is found in the same place as the body. These proposals stem from the fact that the granite burial vault is much too small to have facilitated an actual burial.

The substructure of the south tomb is entered through a tunnel-like corridor with a staircase that descends about 30 m before opening up into the pink granite burial chamber. The staircase then continues east and leads to a gallery that imitates the blue chambers below the step pyramid.

Current evidence suggests that the south tomb was finished before the pyramid. The symbolic king's inner palace, decorated in blue faience, is much more complete than that of the pyramid. Three chambers of this substructure are decorated in blue faience to imitate reed-mat facades, just like the pyramid. One room is decorated with three niche reliefs of the king, one depicting him running the Heb-sed. Importantly, Egyptian builders chose to employ their most skilled artisans and depict their finest art in the darkest, most inaccessible place in the complex. This highlights the fact that this craftsmanship was not meant for the benefit of the living but was meant to ensure the king had all the tools necessary for a successful afterlife.

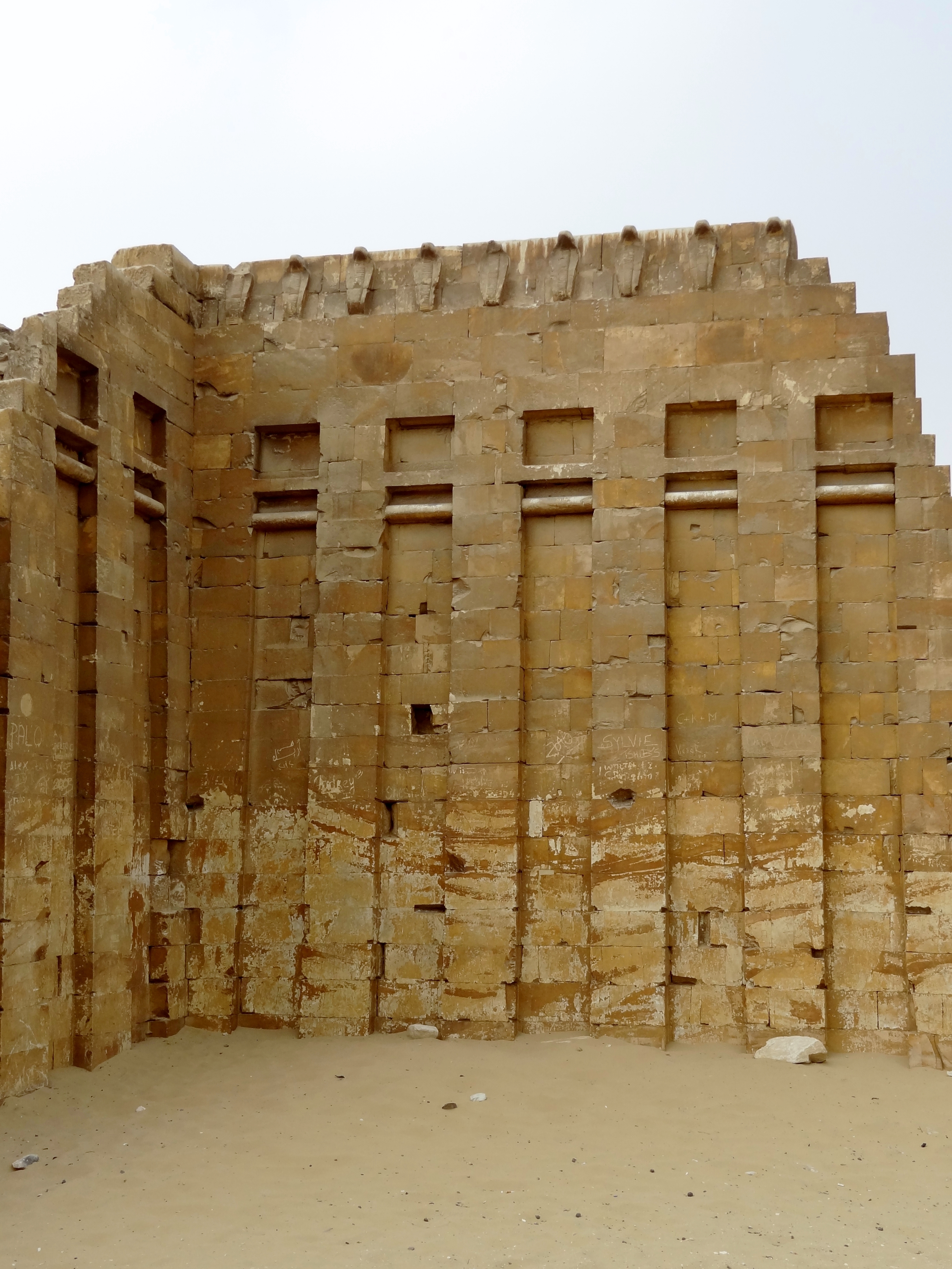
South tomb chapel's niched wall with cobra frieze

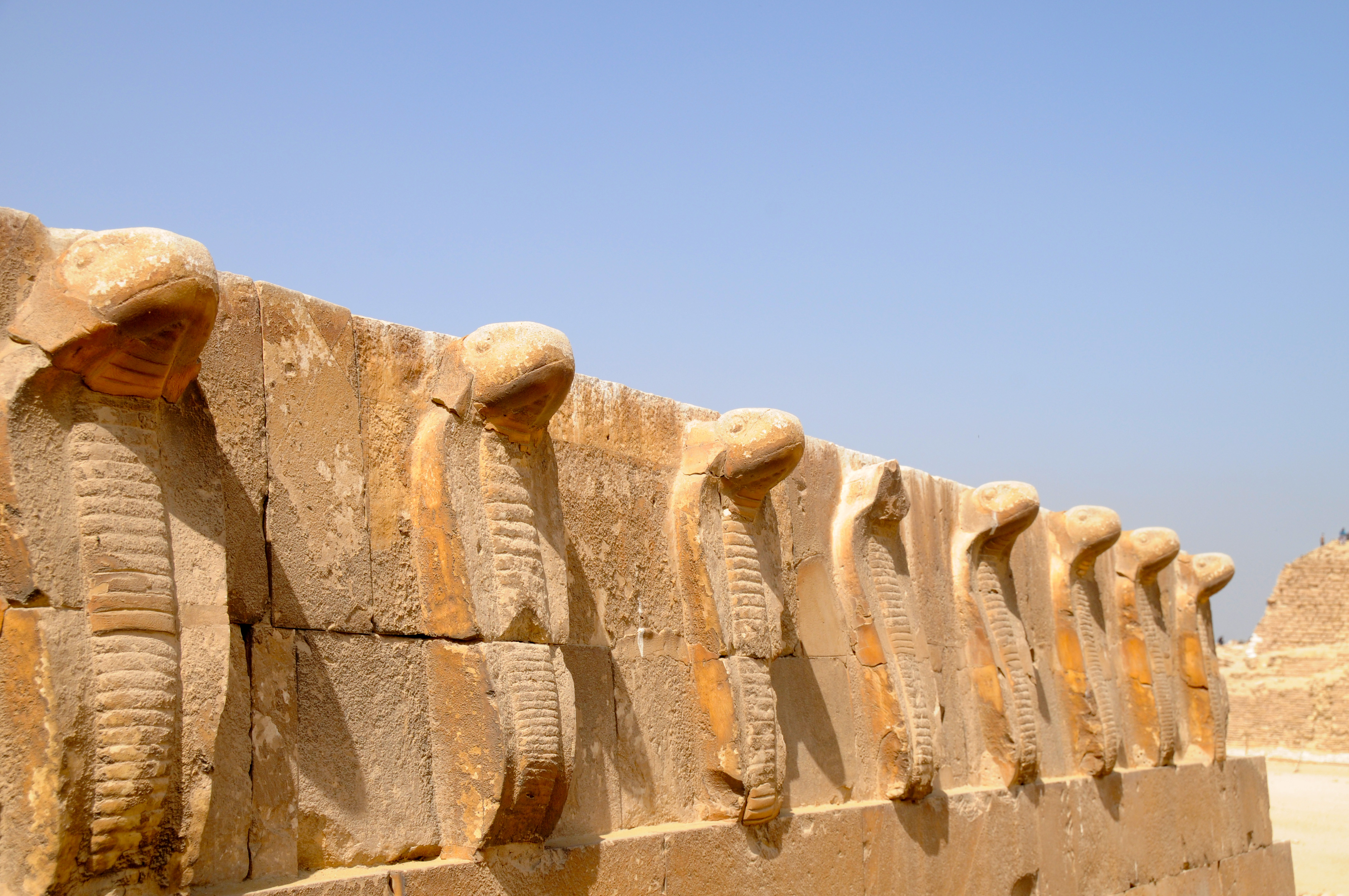
Detail of the cobra frieze

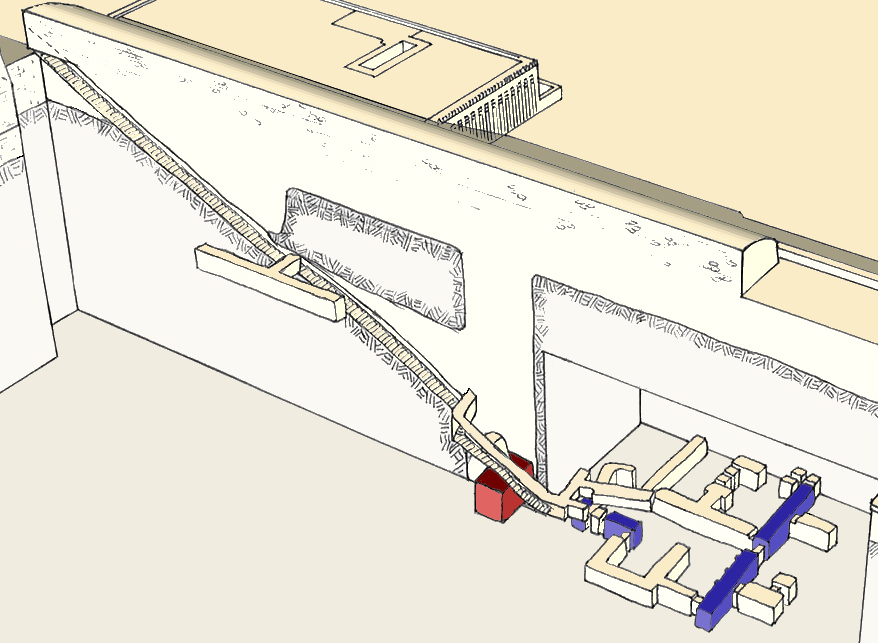
South tomb substructure: burial chamber (red), blue-tiled chambers (blue)

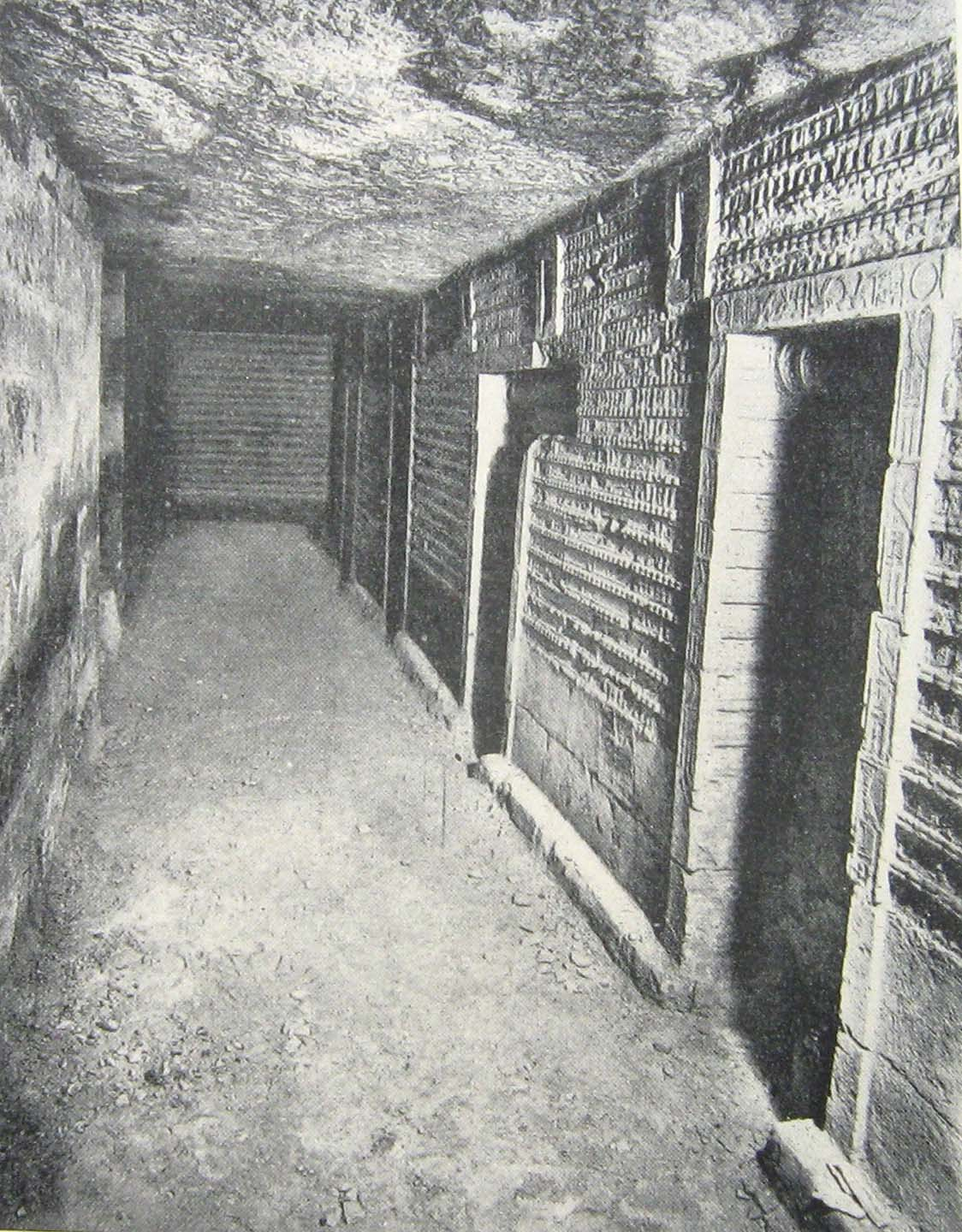
Blue-tiled chambers of the south tomb

=== North temple and serdab court ===
The northern (funerary/mortuary) temple was on the north side of the pyramid and faced the north stars, which the king wished to join in eternity. This structure provided a place in which the daily rituals and offerings to the dead could be performed, and was the cult center for the king. To the east of the temple is the serdab. The king's ka inhabited the ka statue, in order to benefit from daily ceremonies like the opening of the mouth, a ceremony that allowed him to breathe and eat, and the burning of incense. He witnessed these ceremonies through two small eye holes cut in the north wall of the serdab. This temple appeared on the north side of the pyramid throughout the 3rd Dynasty, as the king wished to go north to become one of the eternal stars in the North Sky that never set. In the 4th Dynasty, when there was a religious shift to an emphasis on rebirth and eternity achieved through the sun, the temple was moved to the east side of the pyramid, where the sun rises, so that through association the king may be reborn every day.

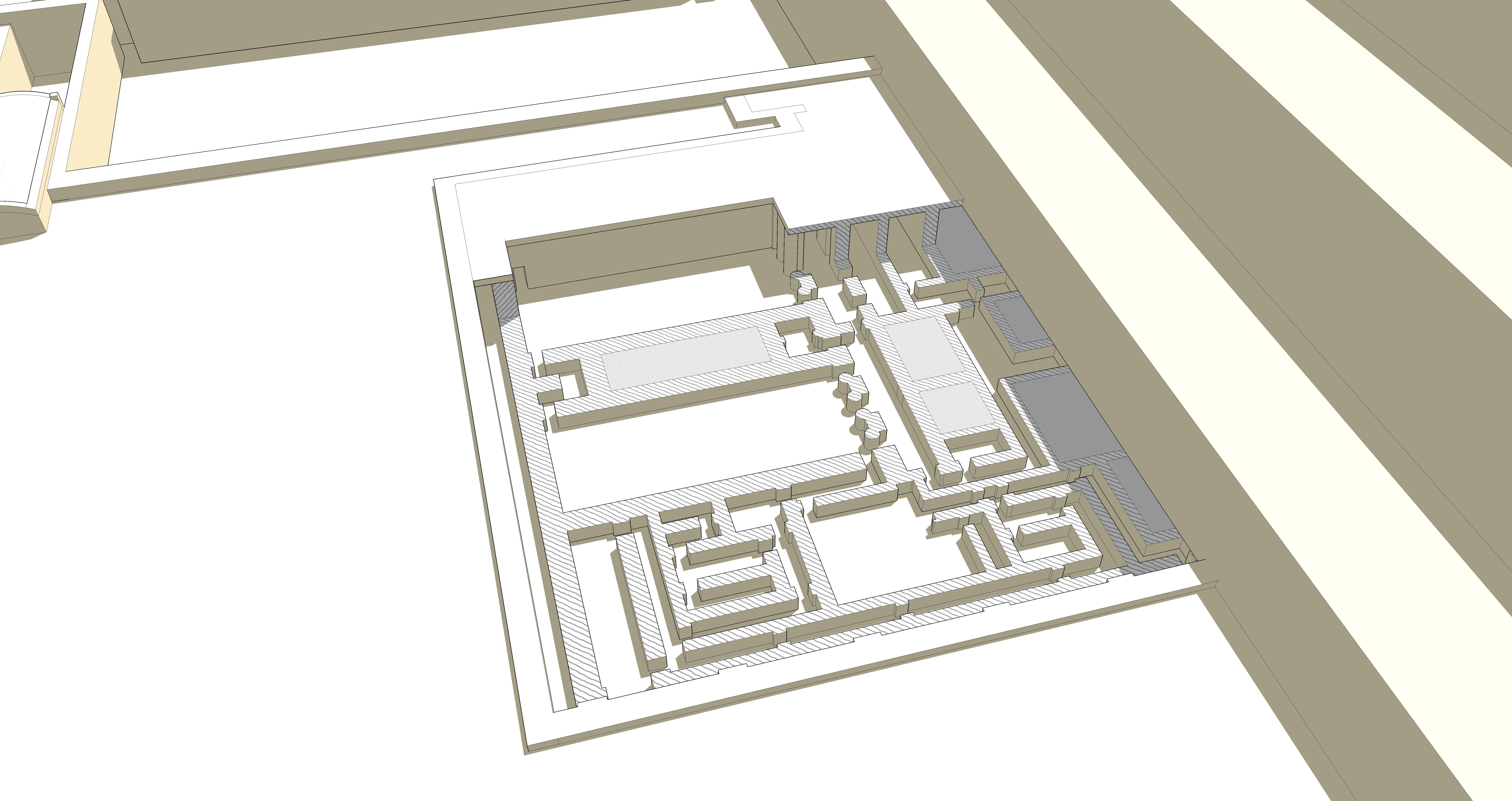
Reconstruction of the north mortuary temple (cross section), looking east

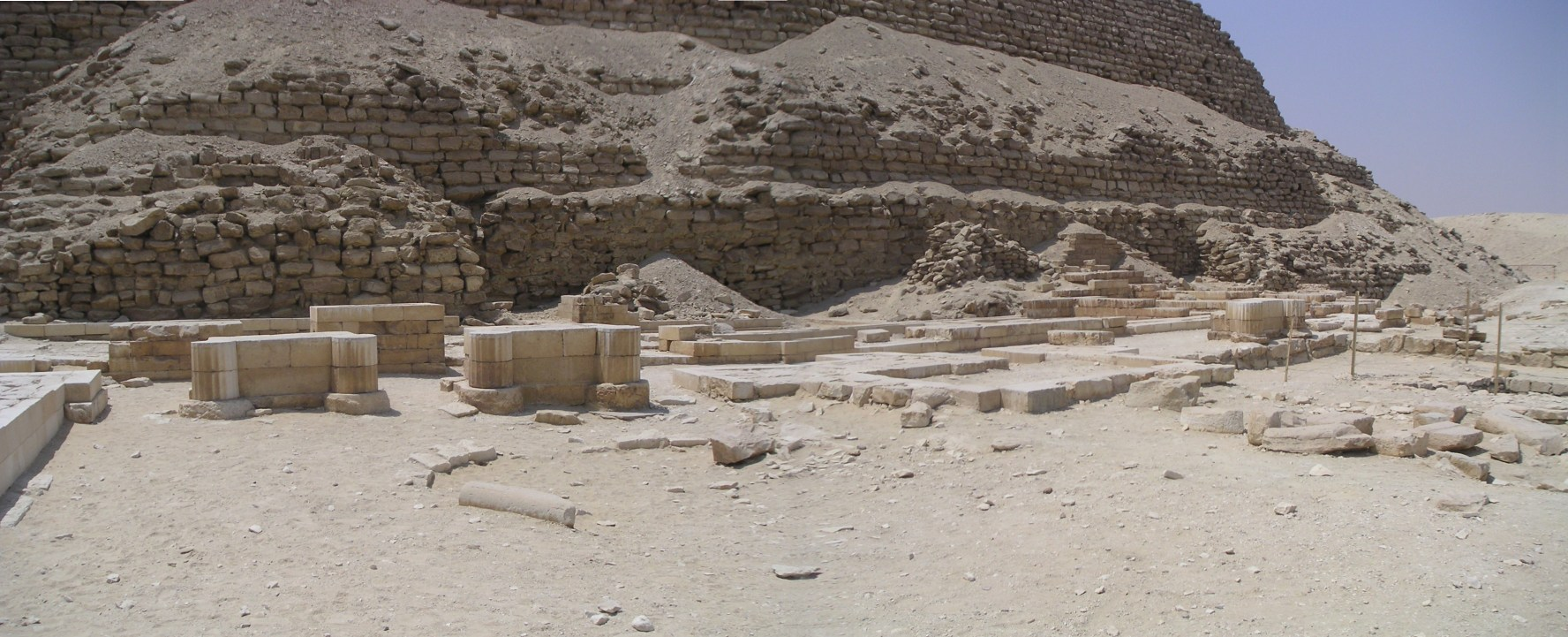
Ruins of the mortuary temple (from within, looking south)

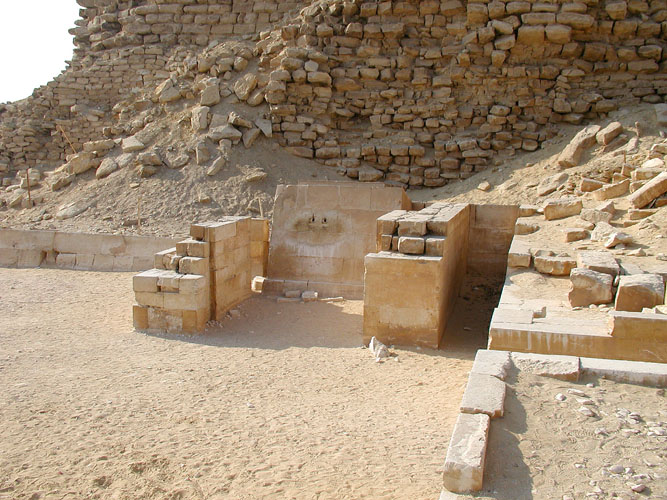
The serdab next to the mortuary temple

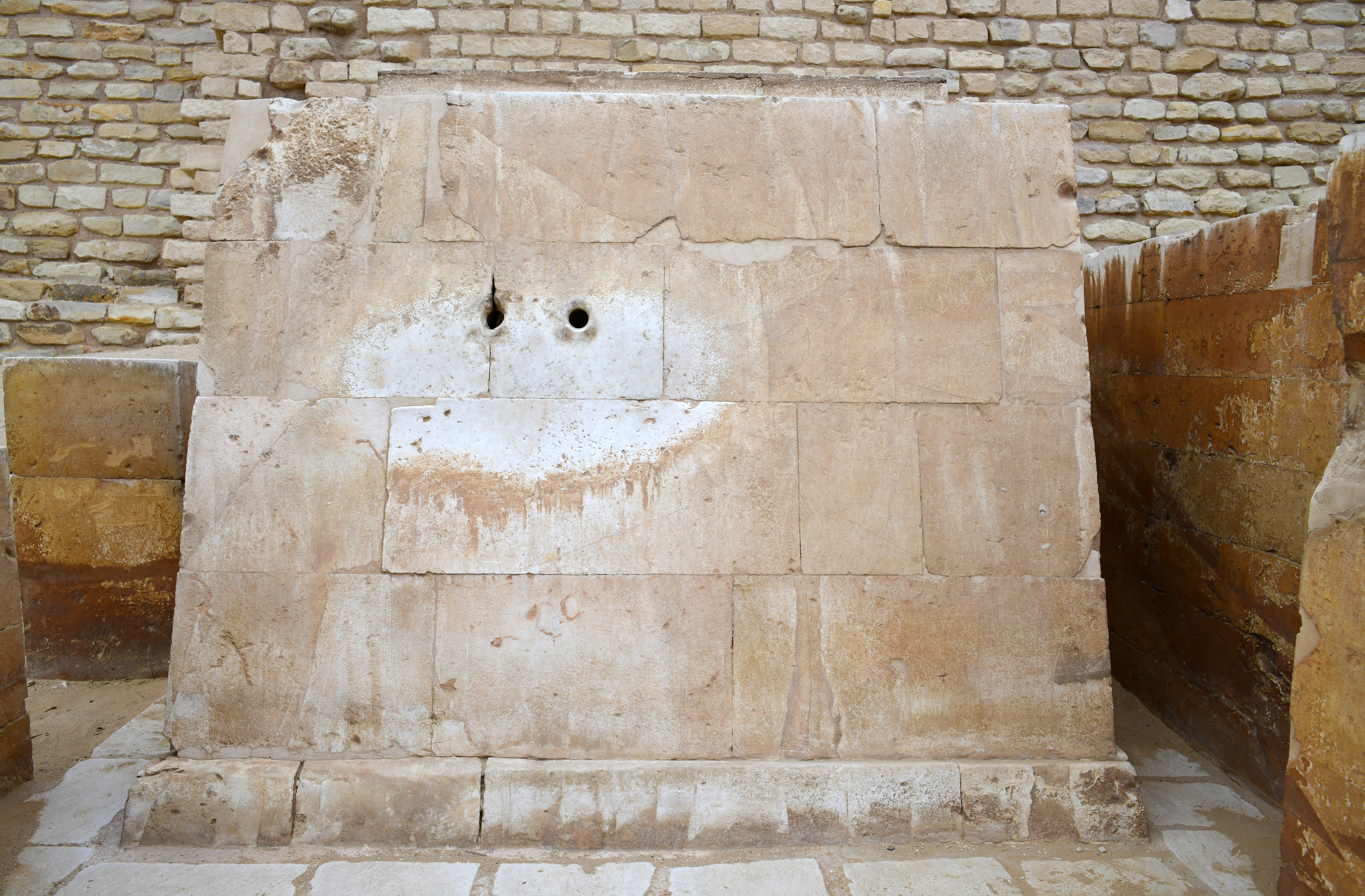
Closeup of the serdab

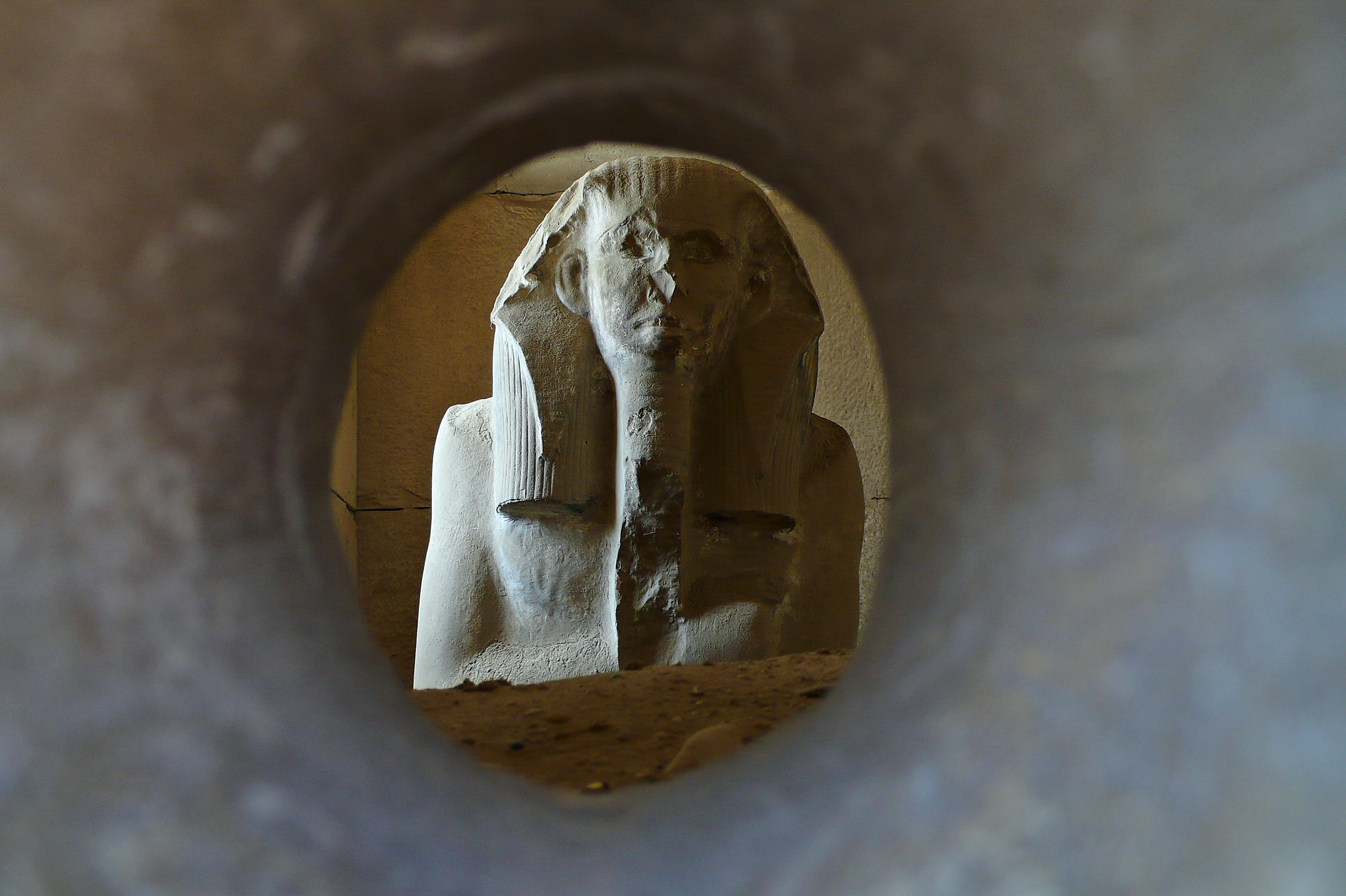
The replica of the ka statue, seen through the serdab eye hole

=== Heb-sed court ===
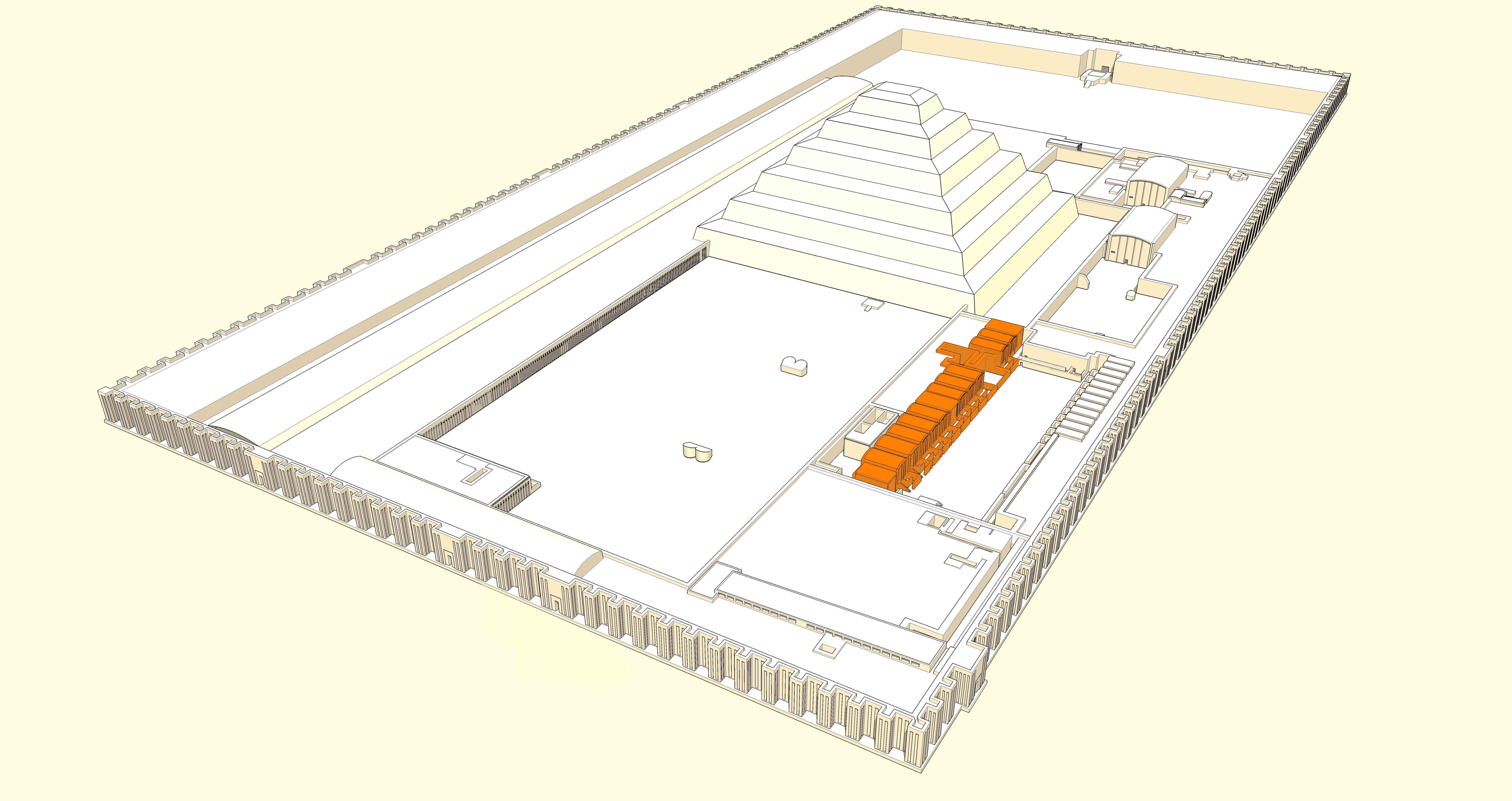
Location of the Heb-sed court chapels

The Heb-sed court is rectangular and parallel to the South Courtyard. It was meant to provide a space in which the king could perform the Heb-sed ritual in the afterlife. Flanking the east and west sides of the court are the remains of two groups of chapels, many of which are dummy buildings, of three different architectural styles. At the north and south ends there are three chapels with flat roofs and no columns. The remaining chapels on the west side are decorated with fluted columns and capitals flanked by leaves. Each of the chapels has a sanctuary accessed by a roofless passage with walls that depict false doors and latches. Some of these buildings have niches for statues. Egyptologists believe that these buildings were related to the important double coronation of the king during the Heb-sed.

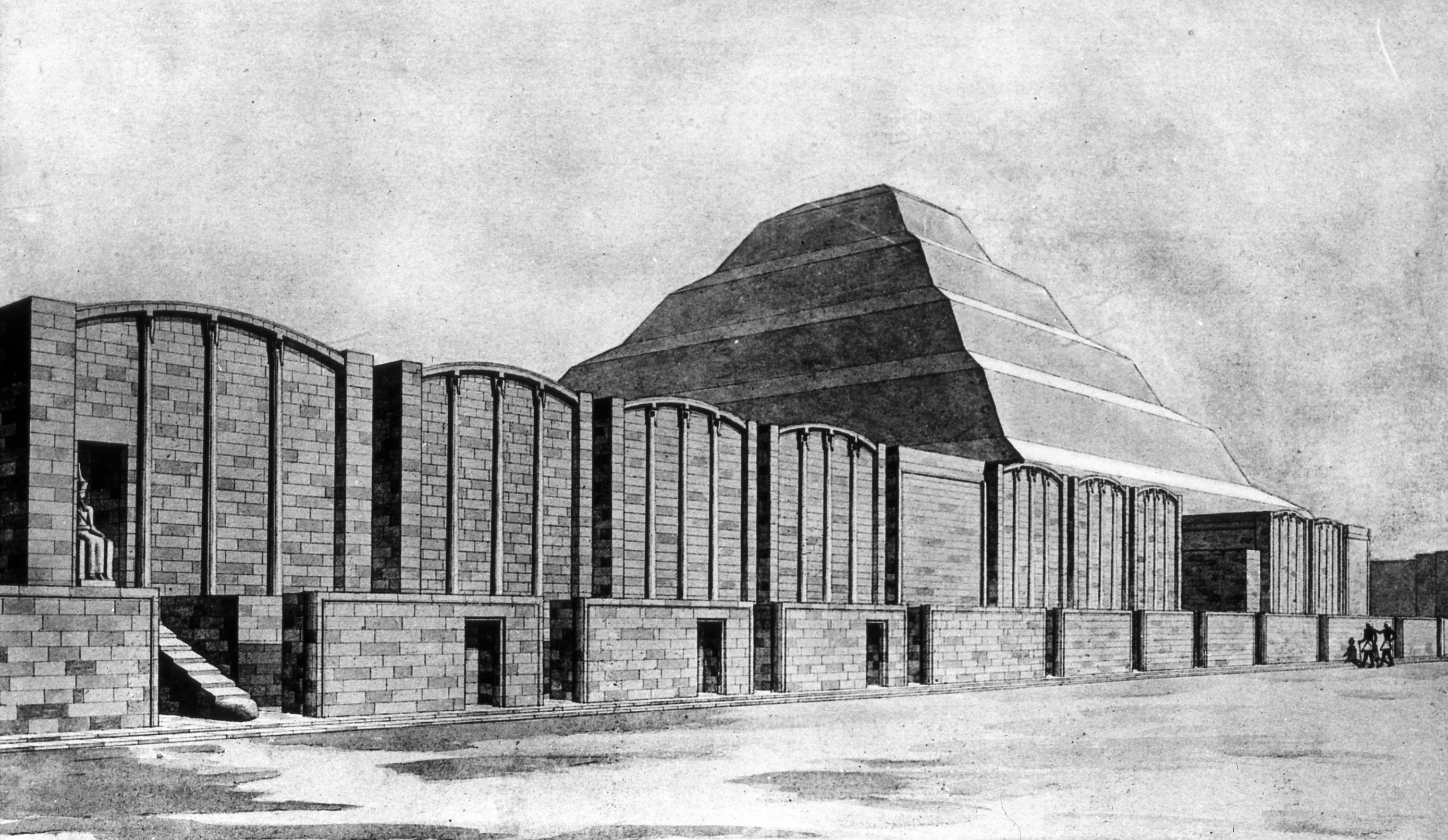
Artist's conception of the Heb-sed court chapels as they originally looked

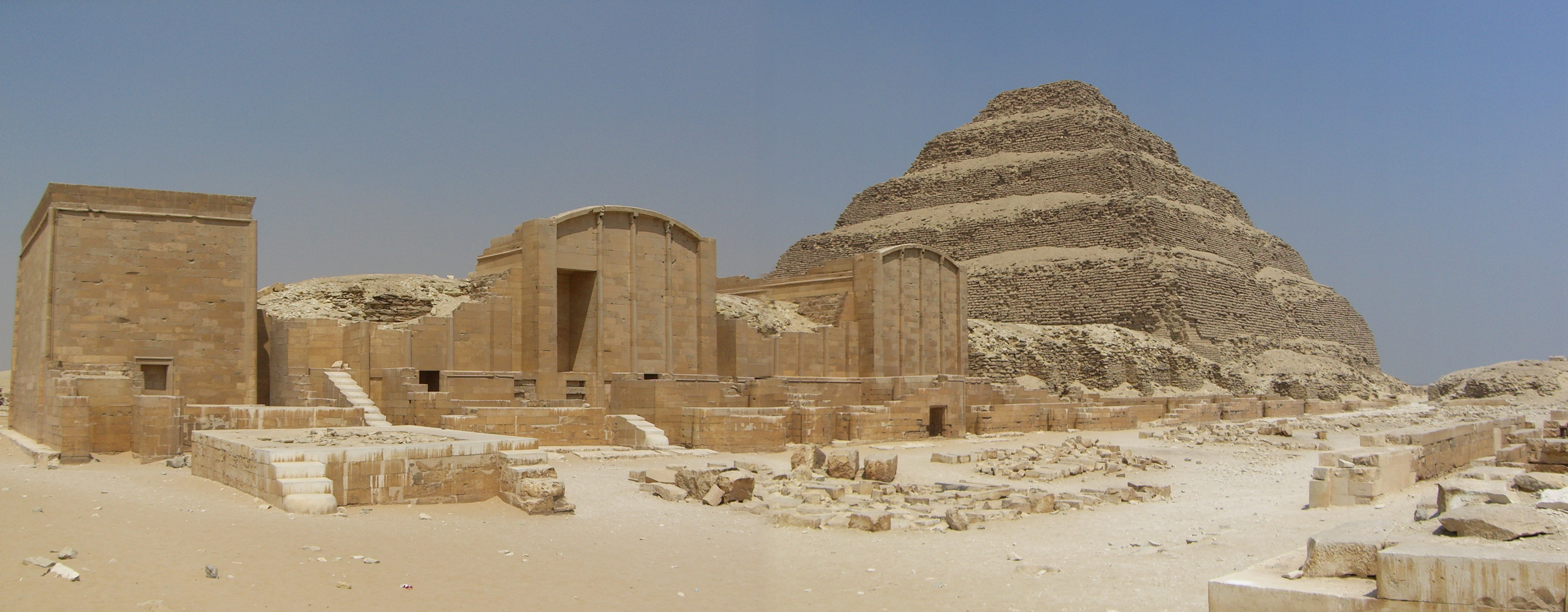
Chapels of the Heb-sed court, looking west

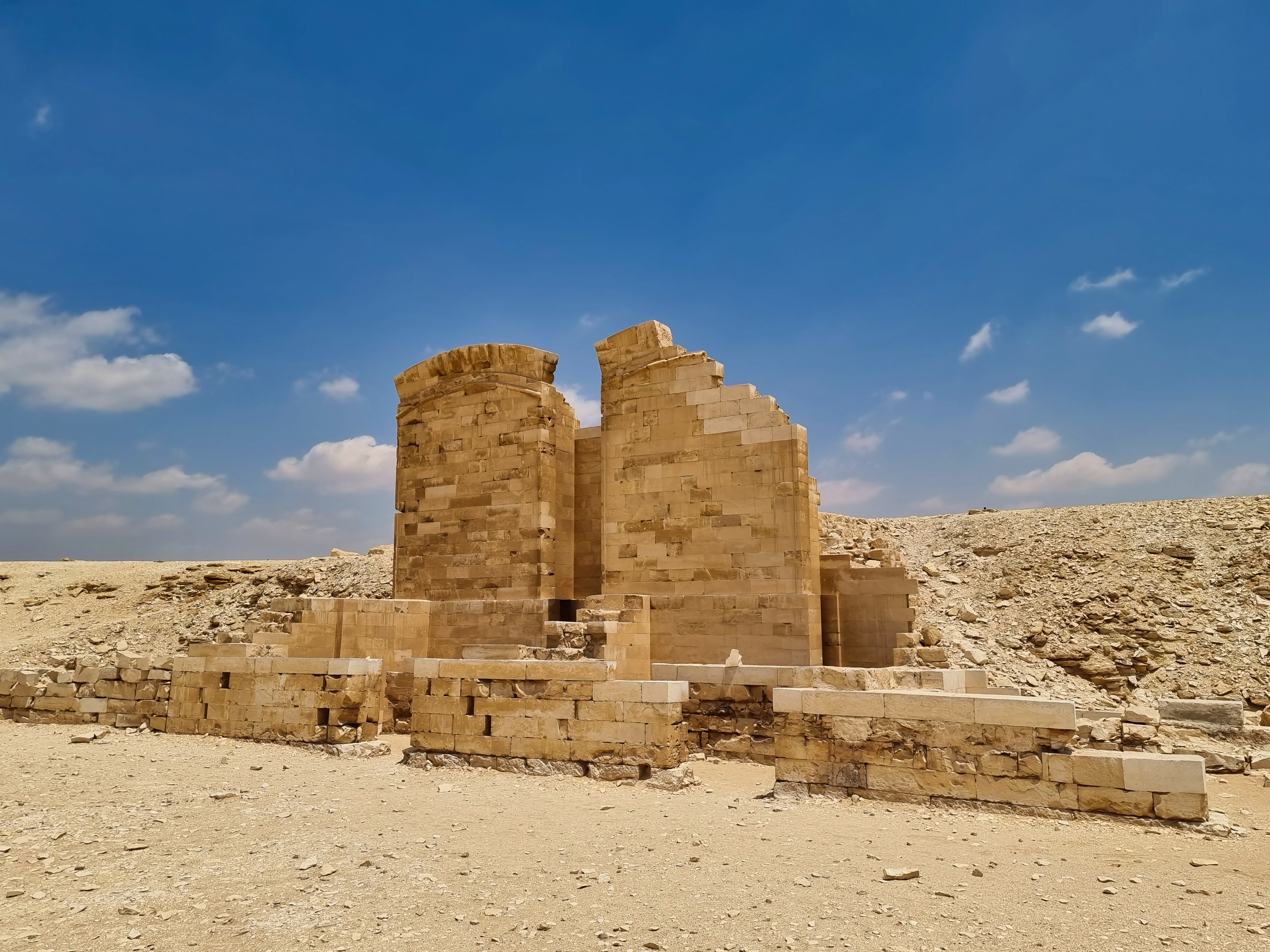
Chapels on the Heb-sed court's east side

Osirian statues of Djoser found in the Heb-sed courtyard, with some found incomplete

== See also ==
- Egyptian pyramid construction techniques
- List of Egyptian pyramids

== Citations ==
Records
Preceded by Anu ziggurat	World's tallest structure c. 2667 BCE – 2610 BCE; 62 m	Succeeded by Meidum Pyramid
