= Jericho =

Palestinian city in the West Bank

Coordinates: 31°51′22″N 35°27′36″E

Jericho أريحا
- Palestinian city

Arabic transcription(s)
  - ALA-LC: Arīḥā
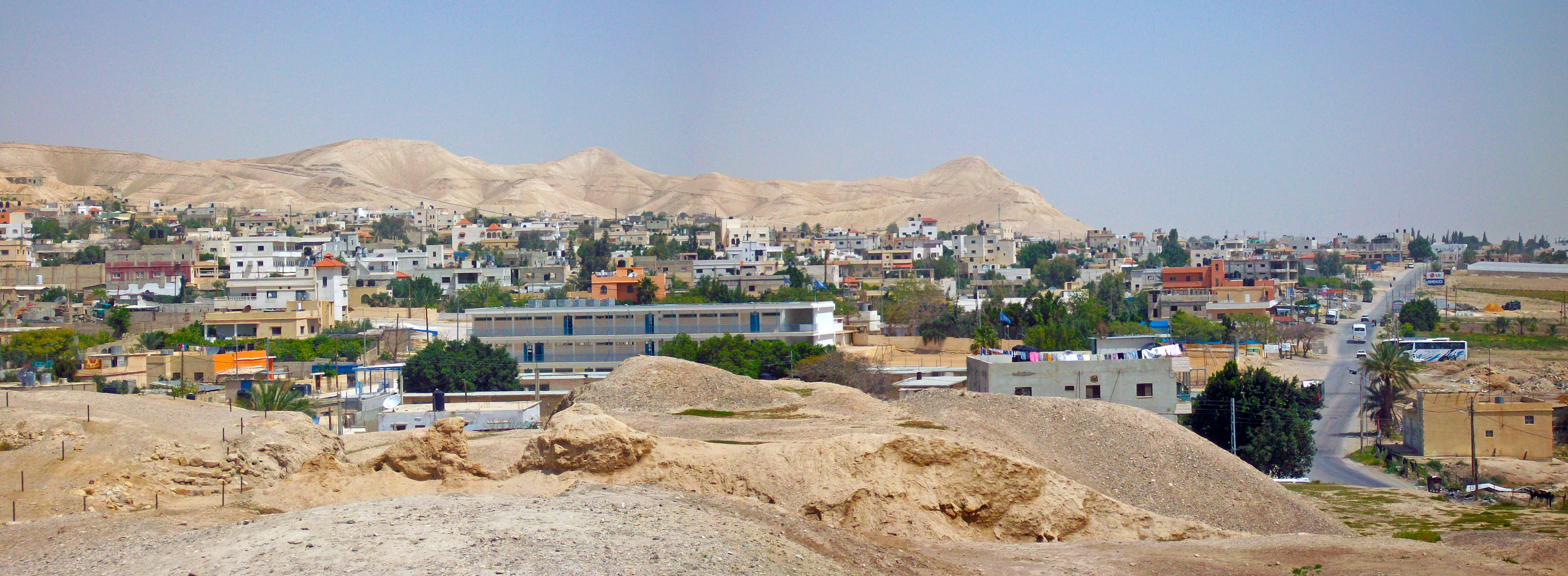
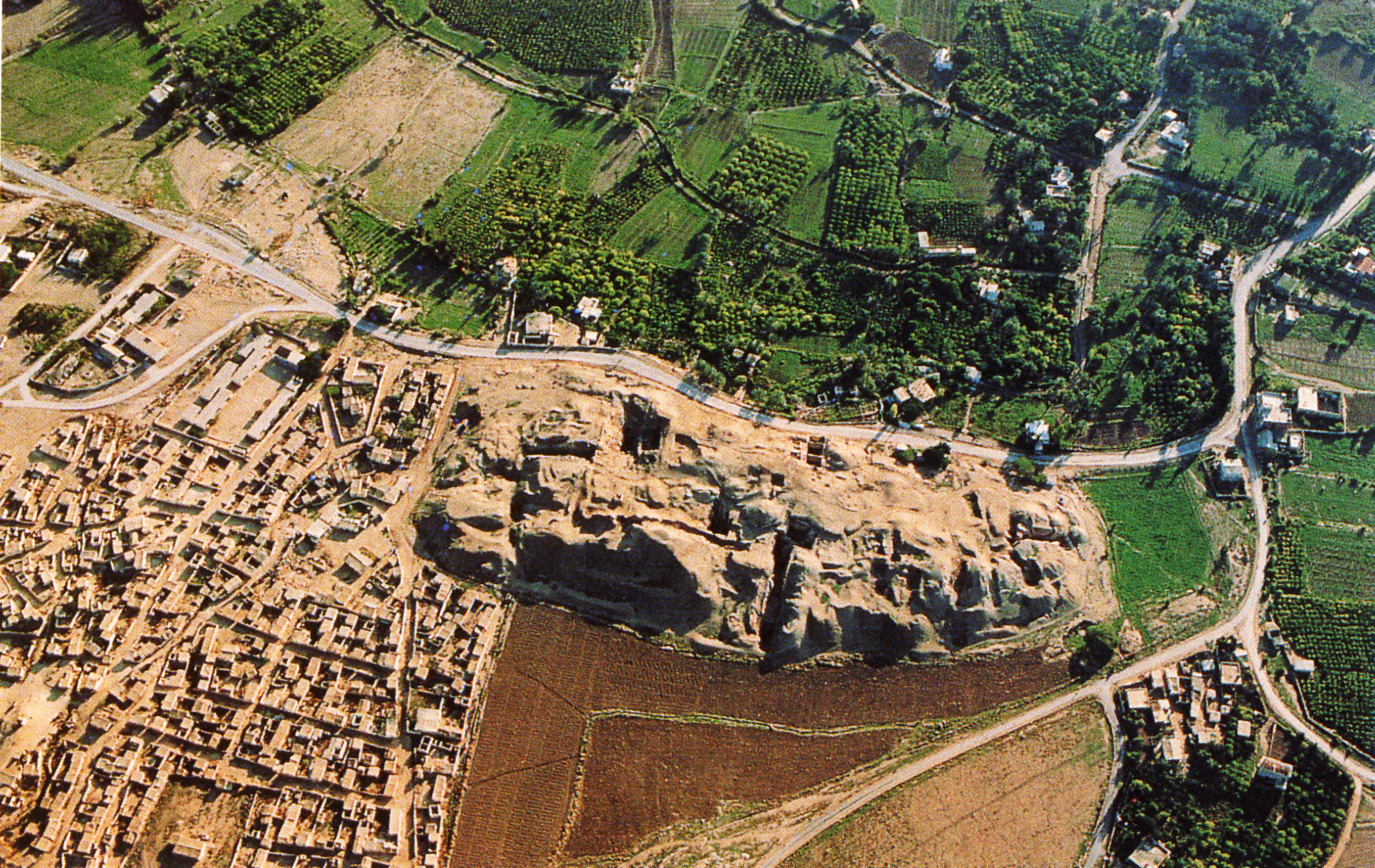
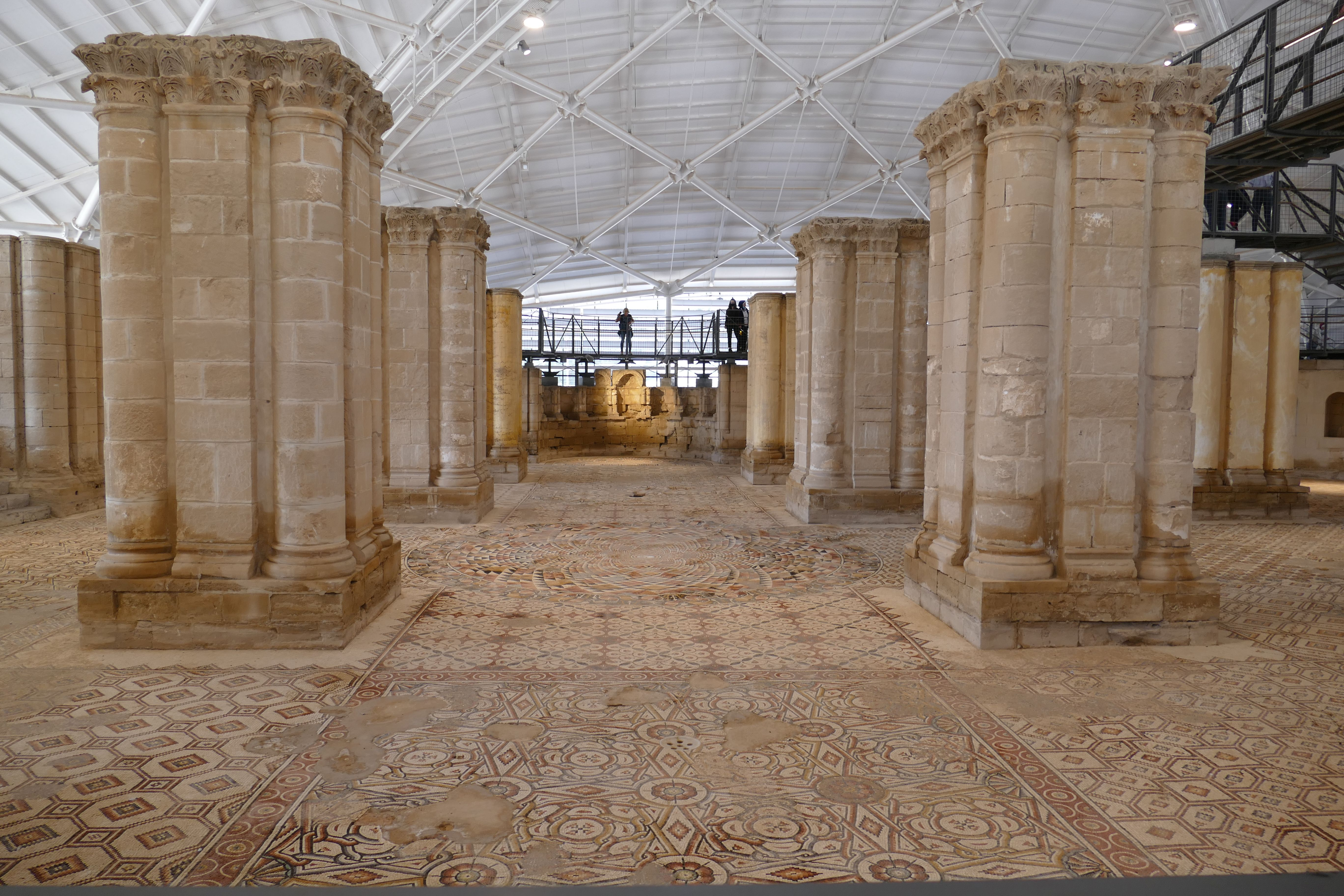
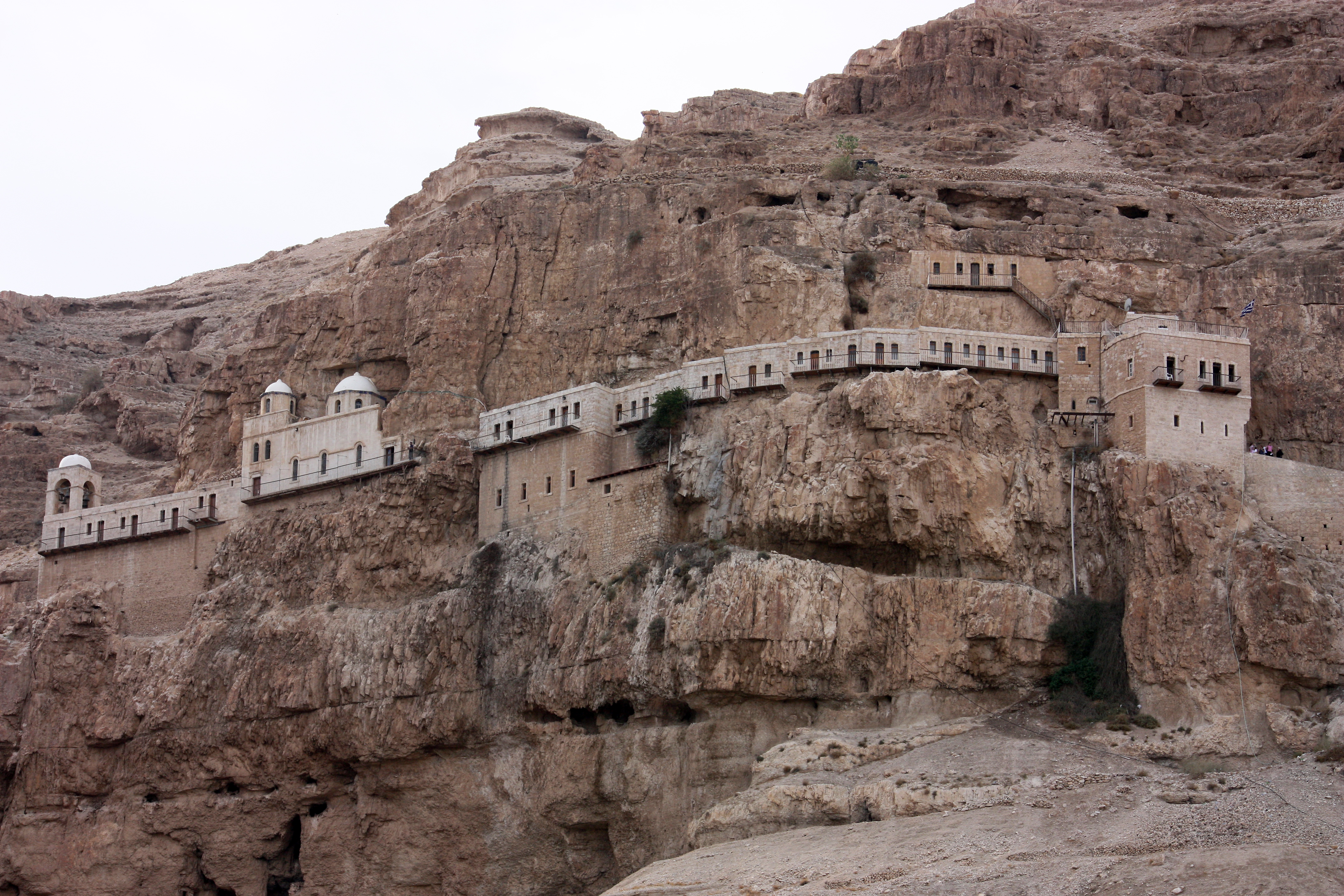
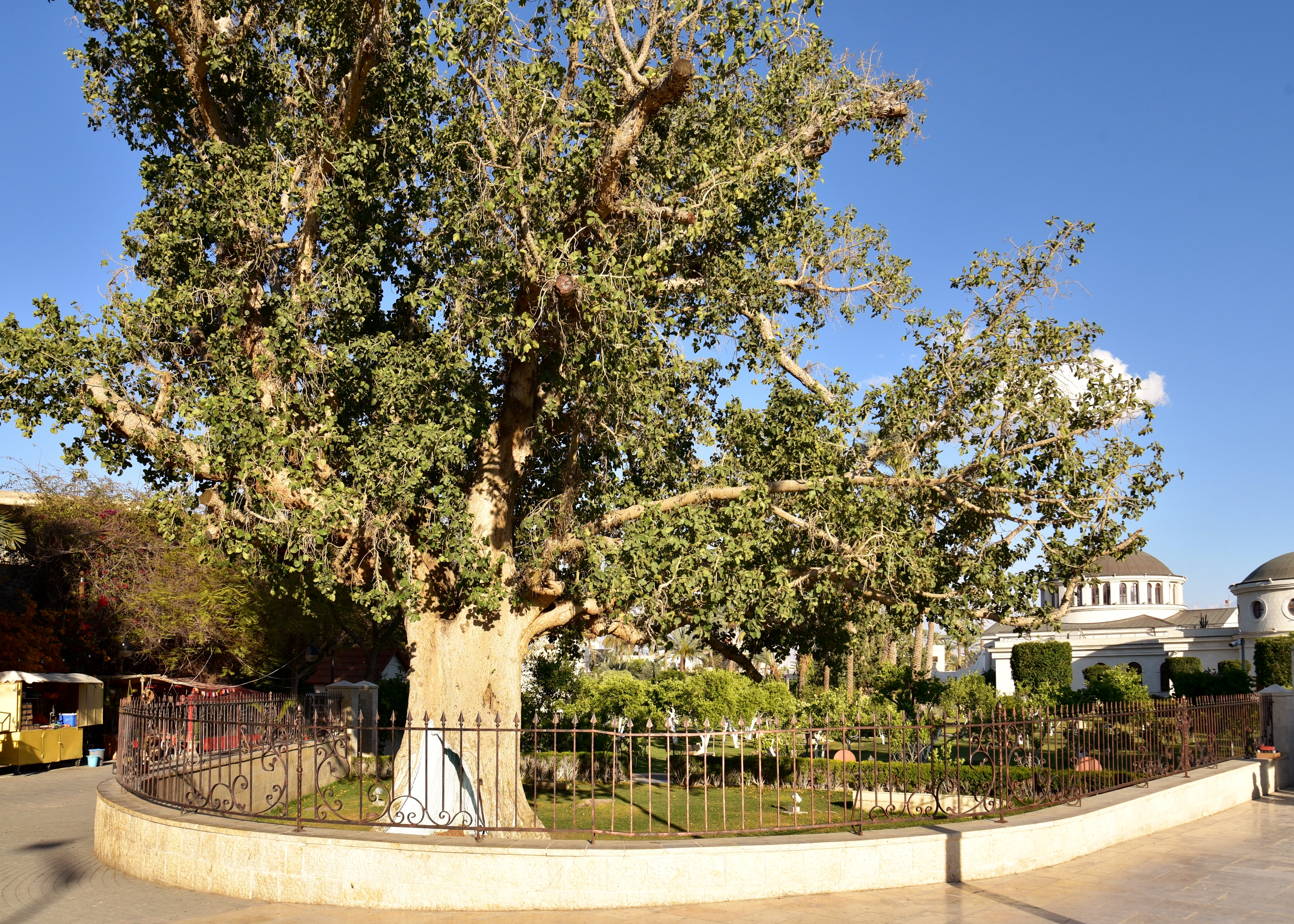
- Jericho from Tell es-Sultan Tell es-Sultan (Ancient Jericho) Hisham's Palace Monastery of the Temptation Sycamore Tree of Zacchaeus

- Municipal logo
- Interactive map of Jericho
- Location of Jericho within Palestine
- Palestine grid: 193/140
- Country: State of Palestine
- Governorate: Jericho
- Founded: c. 9000 BCE

Government
  - Type: City (from 1994)
  - Head of Municipality: Salem Ghrouf

Area
  - Total: 58,701 dunams (58.701 km^{2}; 22.665 sq mi)
- Elevation: −258 m (−846 ft)

Population (2017)
  - Total: 20,907
  - Density: 356.16/km^{2} (922.45/sq mi)

Jericho (/ˈdʒɛrɪkoʊ/ JERR-ik-oh; Arabic: أريحا, romanized: Arīḥā, IPA: [ʔaˈriːħaː]; Hebrew: יְרֵחוֹ, romanized: Yərīḥō) is a city in the West Bank, Palestine, and the capital of the Jericho Governorate. The city is located in the Jordan Valley, with the Jordan River to the east and Jerusalem to the west.

Jericho is among the oldest cities in the world. Archaeologists have unearthed the remains of more than 20 successive settlements in Jericho, the first of which dates back 11,000 years (to 9000 BCE), almost to the very beginning of the Holocene epoch of the Earth's history. Copious springs in and around the city have attracted human habitation for thousands of years. Jericho is described in the Bible as the "city of palm trees".

Following the era of Mandatory Palestine, the West Bank was annexed and ruled by Jordan starting in 1950, then was occupied by Israel in 1967. Administrative control of Jericho was handed over to the Palestinian Authority in 1994.

The city had a population of 20,907 in 2017. In 2023, the archaeological site in the center of the city, known as Tell es-Sultan / Old Jericho, was inscribed in UNESCO's list as a World Heritage Site in the State of Palestine, and described as the "oldest fortified city in the world".

== Etymology ==
Jericho's name in Biblical Hebrew, Yəriḥo (יְרִיחוֹ) is generally thought to derive from the Canaanite word rēḥ 'fragrant', but other theories hold that it originates in the Canaanite word Yaraḥ 'moon' or the name of the lunar deity Yarikh, for whom the city was an early centre of worship.

Jericho's Arabic name, Arīḥā, means 'fragrant' and also has its roots in Canaanite rēḥ.

== History and archaeology ==
The first excavations of the site were carried out by Charles Warren in 1868. Ernst Sellin and Carl Watzinger excavated Tell es-Sultan and Tulul Abu el-'Alayiq between 1907 and 1909, and in 1911, and John Garstang excavated between 1930 and 1936. Kathleen Kenyon worked there between 1952 and 1958.

Subsequently, Lorenzo Nigro and Nicolò Marchetti excavated in 1997–2000. Since 2009, the Italian-Palestinian archaeological project of excavation and restoration was resumed by Rome ("La Sapienza" University and Palestinian MOTA-DACH) under the direction of Nigro, Hamdan Taha, and Jehad Yasine since 2015. The Italian-Palestinian Expedition carried out 13 seasons in 20 years (1997–2017), with some major discoveries, like Tower A1 in the Middle Bronze Age southern Lower Town and Palace G on the eastern flanks of the Spring Hill overlooking the Spring of 'Ain es-Sultan dating from Early Bronze III.

=== Stone Age: Tell es-Sultan and spring ===
The earliest excavated settlement was located at the present-day Tell es-Sultan (or Sultan's Hill), a couple of kilometers from the current city. In both Arabic and Hebrew, tell means "mound"; consecutive layers of habitation built up a mound over time, as is common for ancient settlements in the Middle East and Anatolia. Jericho is the type site for the Pre-Pottery Neolithic A (PPNA) and Pre-Pottery Neolithic B (PPNB) periods.

==== Natufian hunter-gatherers, c. 10,000 BCE ====
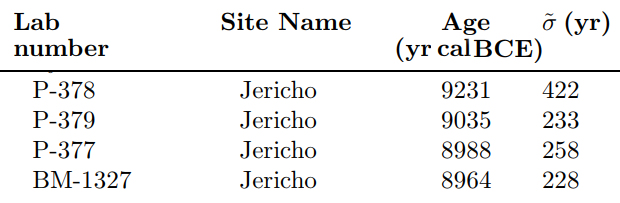
Calibrated carbon 14 dates for Jericho as of 2013

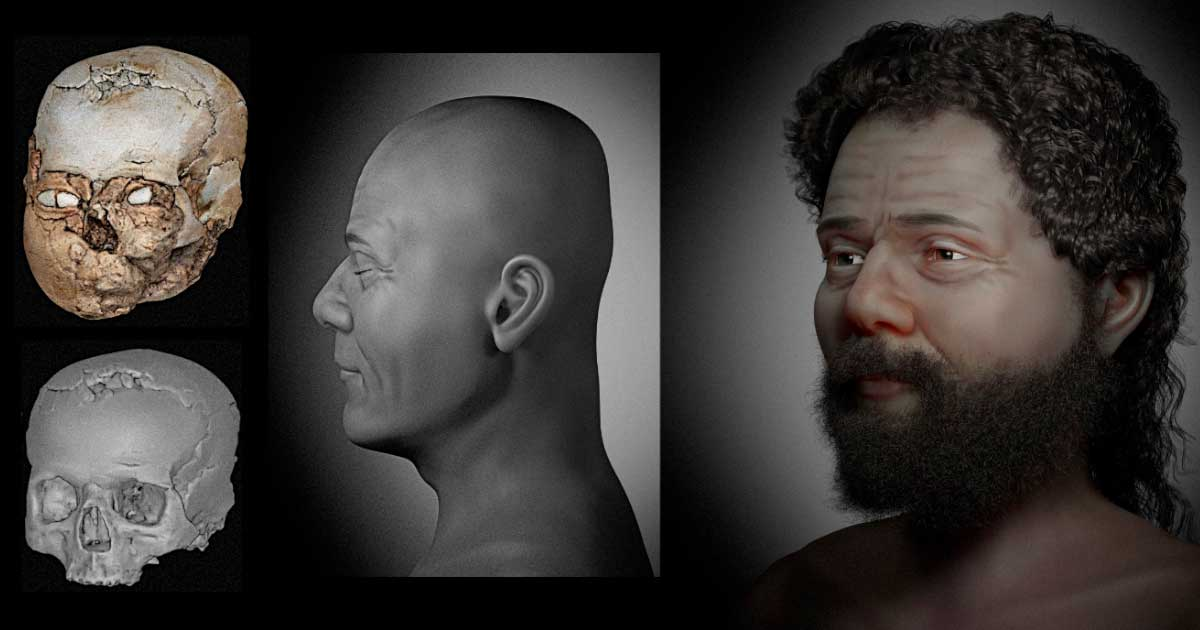
Reconstruction of the Natufian-Jericho skull

Epipaleolithic construction at the site appears to predate the invention of agriculture, with the construction of Natufian culture structures beginning earlier than 9000 BCE, the beginning of the Holocene epoch in geologic history.

Jericho has evidence of settlement dating back to c. 10,000 BCE. During the Younger Dryas period of cold and drought, permanent habitation of any one location was impossible. However, the Ein es-Sultan spring at what would become Jericho was a popular camping ground for Natufian hunter-gatherer groups, who left a scattering of crescent-shaped microlith tools behind them. Around 9600 BCE, the droughts and cold of the Younger Dryas stadial had come to an end, making it possible for Natufian groups to extend the duration of their stay, eventually leading to year-round habitation and permanent settlement.

==== Pre-Pottery Neolithic, c. 9500–6500 BCE ====
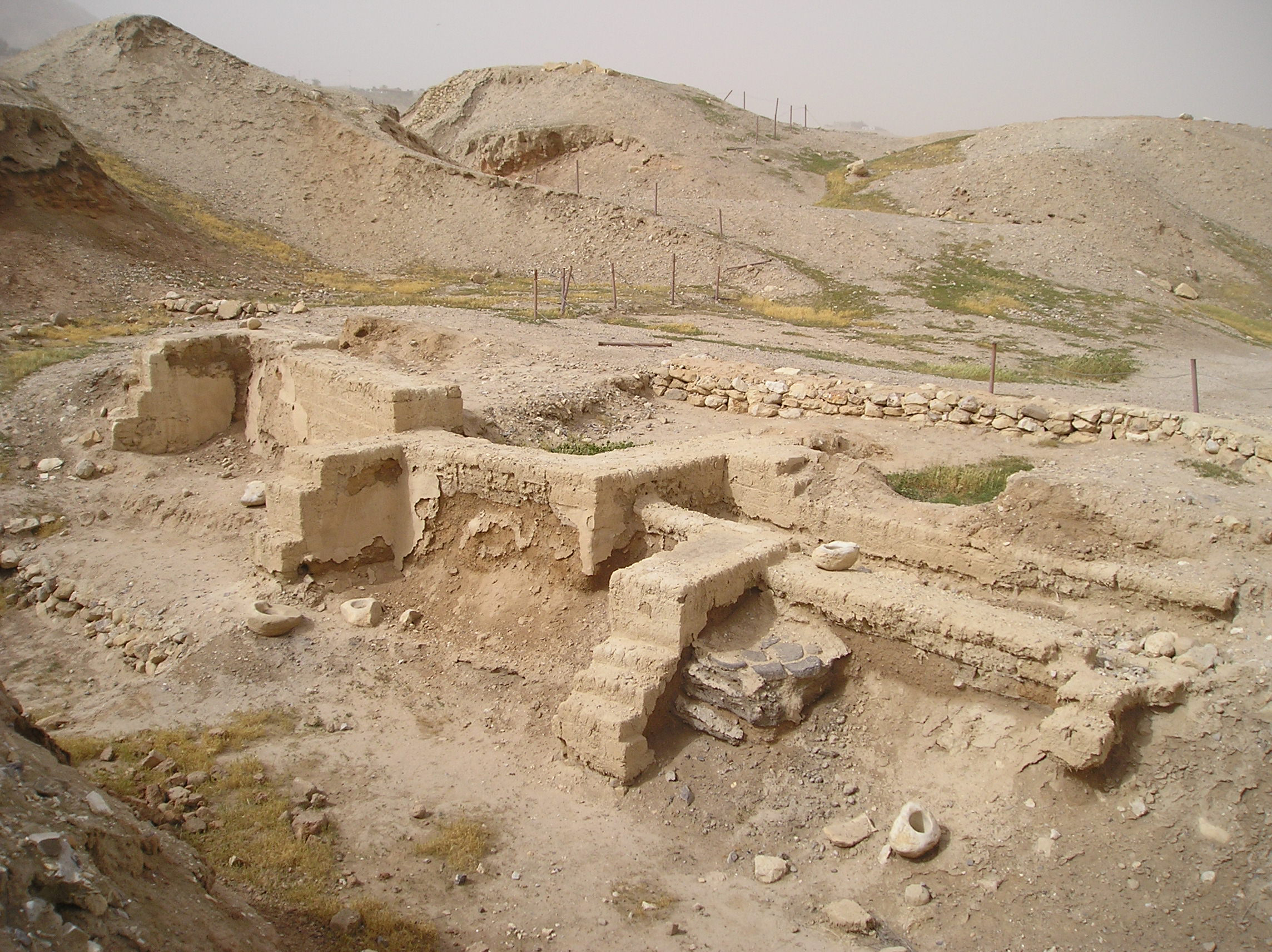
Dwelling foundations unearthed at Tell es-Sultan in Jericho

The Pre-Pottery Neolithic eras at Jericho are divided into PPNA and PPNB.

===== Pre-Pottery Neolithic A (PPNA) =====
The first permanent settlement on the site of Jericho developed near the Ein es-Sultan spring between 9,500 and 9000 BCE. As the world warmed up, a new culture based on agriculture and sedentary dwelling emerged, which archaeologists have termed PPNA. Its cultures lacked pottery, but featured the following:

- small circular dwellings
- burial of the dead under the floor of buildings
- reliance on hunting of wild game
- cultivation of wild or domestic cereals

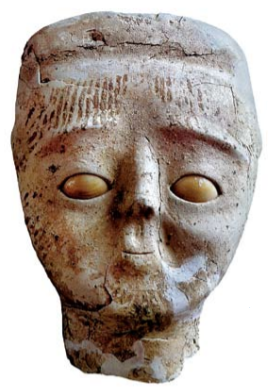
Head of an ancestor statue, Jericho, from c. 9000 years ago, among the oldest representations of a human face ever found. Rockefeller Archeological Museum, Jerusalem.

At Jericho, circular dwellings were built of clay and straw bricks left to dry in the sun, which were plastered together with a mud mortar. Each house measured about 5 metres (16 ft) across and was roofed with mud-smeared brush. Hearths were located within and outside the homes.

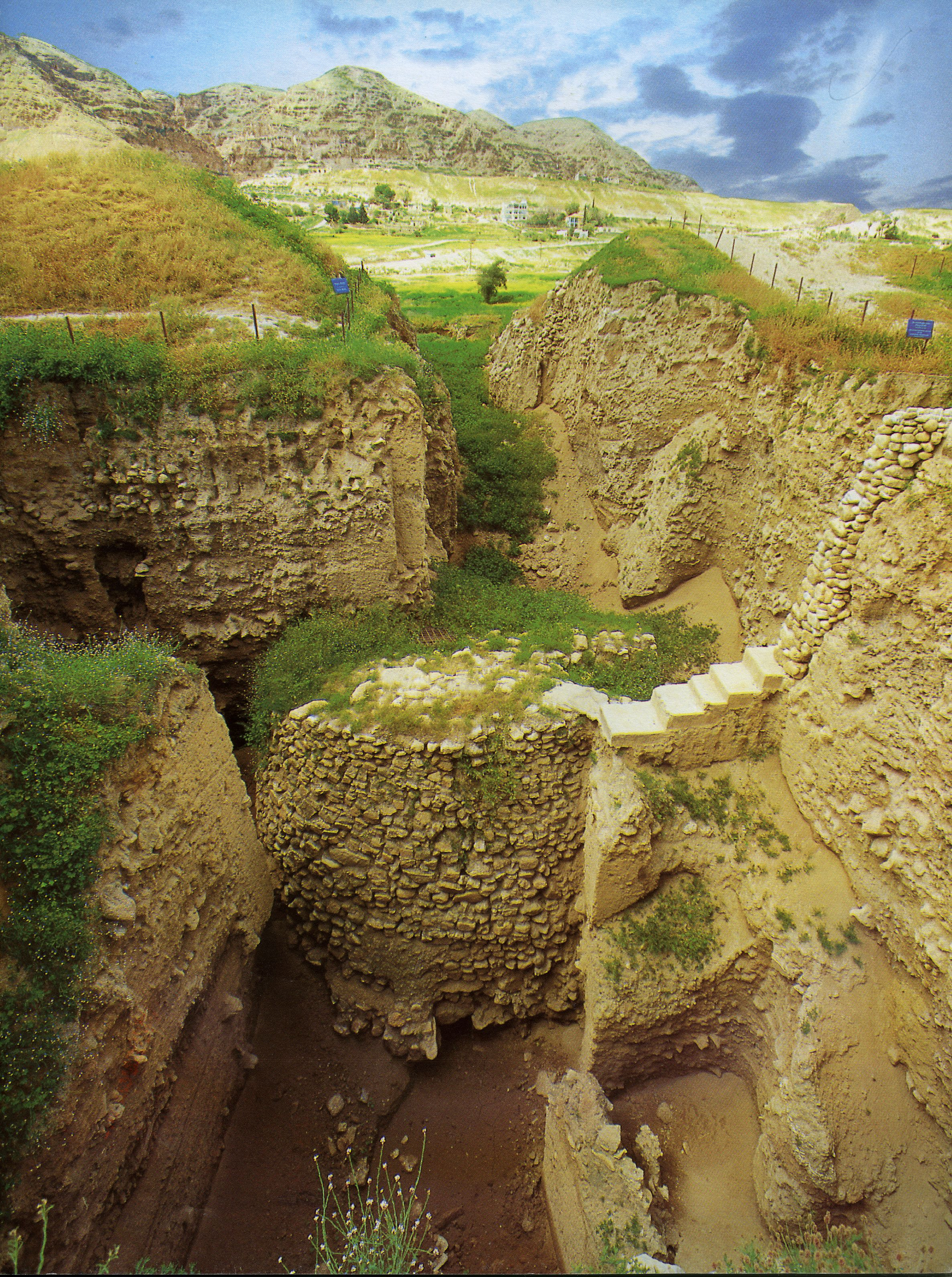
The 8000 BCE Tower of Jericho at Tell es-Sultan

The Pre-Sultan (c. 8350 – 7370 BCE) is sometimes called Sultanian. The site is a 40,000 m^{2} (430,000 sq ft) settlement surrounded by a massive stone wall over 3.6 m (12 ft) high and 1.8 m (5 ft 11 in) wide at the base, inside of which stood a stone tower, over 8.5 metres (28 ft) high, containing an internal staircase with 22 stone steps and placed in the centre of the west side of the tell. This tower and the even older ones excavated at Tell Qaramel in Syria are the oldest towers ever to be discovered.

The wall and tower were built during the PPNA period around 8000 BCE. Carbon dates published in 1981 and 1983 indicate that the tower was built around 8300 BCE and stayed in use until c. 7800 BCE. The wall may have served as a defence against flood water (possibly to prevent the erosion of agricultural soil), with the tower used for ceremonial purposes. The wall and tower would have taken a hundred men more than a hundred days to construct, suggesting some kind of social organization. The town contained round mud-brick houses, but no street planning. The identity and number of Jericho's inhabitants during the PPNA period is still under debate, with estimates as high as 2,000–3,000 and as low as 200–300. It is known that this population had domesticated emmer wheat, barley and pulses, and hunted wild animals.

===== Pre-Pottery Neolithic B (PPNB) =====
The PPNB was a period of about 1.4 millennia, from 7220 to 5850 BCE (though carbon-14-dates are few and early). The following are PPNB cultural features:

- Expanded range of domesticated plants
- Possible domestication of sheep
- Apparent cult involving the preservation of human skulls, with facial features reconstructed using plaster, and eyes set with shells in some cases

Area of the Fertile Crescent, c. 7500 BC, with main sites. Jericho was a foremost site of the Pre-Pottery Neolithic period. The area of Mesopotamia proper was not yet settled by humans.

After a few centuries, the first settlement was abandoned. After the PPNA settlement phase, there was a settlement hiatus of around five centuries, then the PPNB settlement was founded on the eroded surface of the tell. This second settlement, established in 6800 BCE, perhaps represents the work of an invading people who absorbed the original inhabitants into their dominant culture. Artifacts dating from this period include ten plastered human skulls, painted so as to reconstitute the individuals' features. These represent either teraphim or the first example of portraiture in art history, and it is thought that they were kept in people's homes while the bodies were buried.

The architecture consisted of rectilinear buildings made of mudbricks on stone foundations. The mudbricks were loaf-shaped with deep thumb prints to facilitate bonding. No building has been excavated in its entirety. Normally, several rooms cluster around a central courtyard. There is one big room (6.5 m × 4 m (21.3 ft × 13.1 ft) and 7 m × 3 m (23.0 ft × 9.8 ft)) with internal divisions; the rest are small, presumably used for storage. The rooms have red or pinkish terrazzo-floors made of lime. Some impressions of mats made of reeds or rushes have been preserved. The courtyards have clay floors.

Kathleen Kenyon interpreted one building as a shrine. It contained a niche in the wall. A chipped pillar of volcanic stone that was found nearby might have fitted into this niche.

The dead were buried under the floors or in the rubble fill of abandoned buildings. There are several collective burials. Not all the skeletons are completely articulated, which may point to a time of exposure before burial. A skull cache contained seven skulls. The jaws were removed and the faces covered with plaster; cowries were used as eyes. A total of ten skulls were found. Modelled skulls were found in Tell Ramad and Beisamoun as well.

Other finds included flints, such as arrowheads (tanged or side-notched), finely denticulated sickle-blades, burins, scrapers, a few tranchet axes, obsidian, and green obsidian from an unknown source. There were also querns, hammerstones, and a few ground-stone axes made of greenstone. Other items discovered included dishes and bowls carved from soft limestone, spindle whorls made of stone and possible loom weights, spatulae and drills, stylised anthropomorphic plaster figures, almost life-size, anthropomorphic and theriomorphic clay figurines, as well as shell and malachite beads.

In the late 4th millennium BCE, Jericho was occupied during Neolithic 2 and the general character of the remains on the site link it culturally with Neolithic 2 (or PPNB) sites in the West Syrian and Middle Euphrates groups. This link is established by the presence of rectilinear mud-brick buildings and plaster floors that are characteristic of the age.

=== Chalcolithic ===
A succession of settlements followed from 4500 BCE onward.

=== Early Bronze Age ===
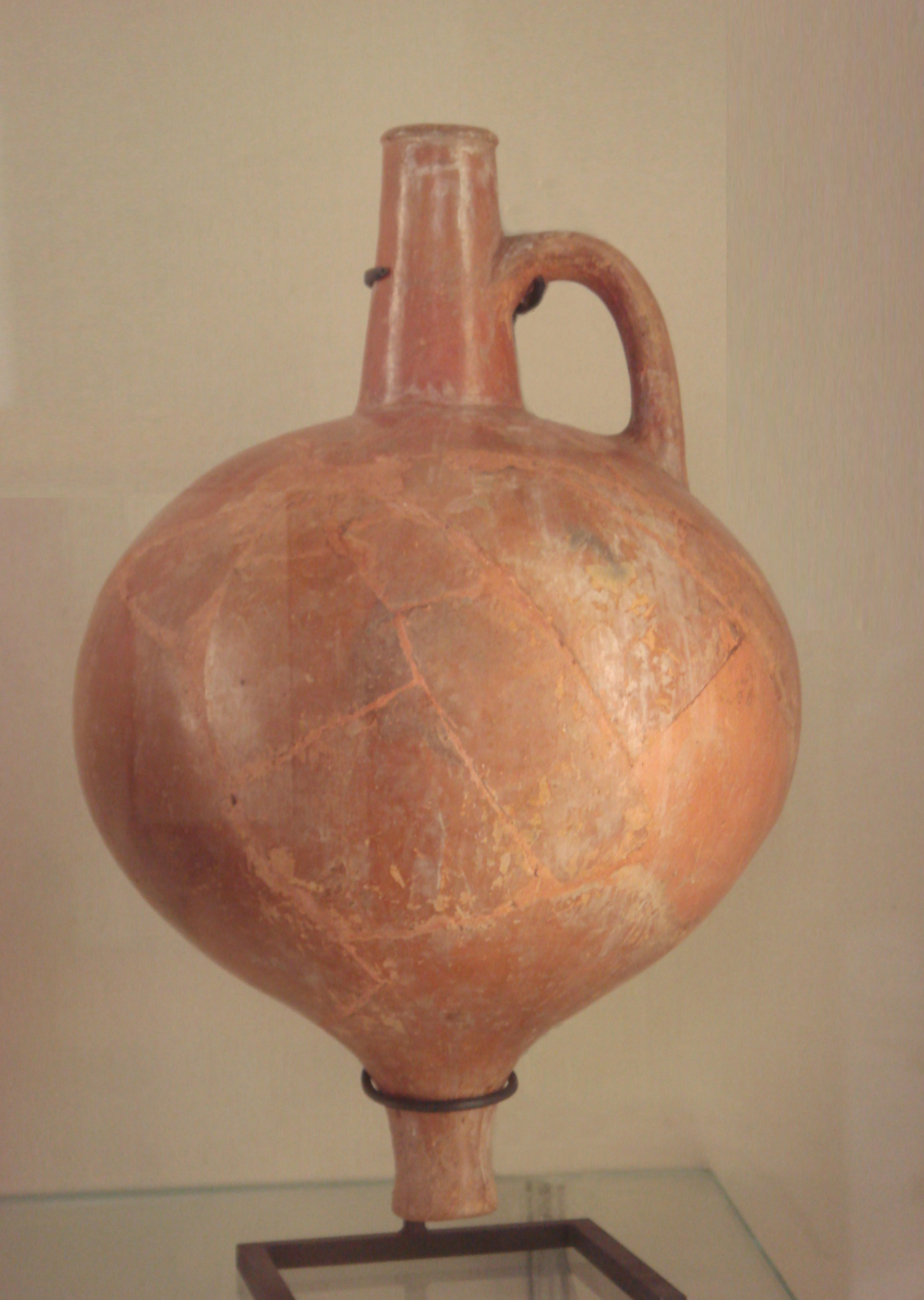
Red terracotta jar, Ancient Bronze period 3500–2000 BCE, Tell es-Sultan, ancient Jericho, Tomb A IV. Louvre Museum AO 15611.

In Early Bronze I, the stratigraphic layers are Sultan IIIA1 village (EB IA, c. 3500 – 3200 BCE) and Sultan IIIA2 rural town (proto-urban, EB IB, c. 3200 – 3000 BCE).

In Early Bronze II, the strategraphic layers are Sultan IIIB1 foritifed town (EB IIA, c. 3000-2850 BCE) and Sultan IIIB2 with added towers and bastions to the fortification (EB IIB, c.2850 – 2700 BCE).

In the Early Bronze IIIA (c. 2700 – 2500/2450 BCE; Sultan IIIC1), the settlement reached its largest extent around 2600 BCE.

During Early Bronze IIIB (c. 2500/2450–2350 BCE; Sultan IIIC2) there was a Palace G on Spring Hill and city walls.

In Early Bronze IV, the strategraphic layers are Sultan IIID1 (EB IVA; 2300 – 2200 BCE) and Sultan IIID2 (EB IVB; 2200 – 2000 BCE).

=== Middle Bronze Age ===
Jericho was continually occupied into the Middle Bronze Age; it was destroyed in the Late Bronze Age, after which it no longer served as an urban centre. The city was surrounded by extensive defensive walls strengthened with rectangular towers, and possessed an extensive cemetery with vertical shaft-tombs and underground burial chambers; the elaborate funeral offerings in some of these may reflect the emergence of local kings.

During the Middle Bronze Age, Jericho was a small prominent city of the Canaan region, reaching its greatest Bronze Age extent in the period from 1700 to 1550 BCE. It seems to have reflected the greater urbanization in the area at that time, and has been linked to the rise of the Maryannu, a class of chariot-using aristocrats linked to the rise of the Mitannite state to the north. Kathleen Kenyon reported "the Middle Bronze Age is perhaps the most prosperous in the whole history of Kna'an. ... The defenses ... belong to a fairly advanced date in that period" and there was "a massive stone revetment ... part of a complex system" of defenses. Bronze Age Jericho fell in the 16th century at the end of the Middle Bronze Age, the calibrated carbon remains from its City-IV destruction layer dating to 1617–1530 BCE. Carbon dating c. 1573 BCE confirmed the accuracy of the stratigraphical dating c. 1550.

Chronology (Nigro 2016)

- Middle Bronze IA, Tell es-Sultan IVa1 (c. 2000/1950-1900 BC)
- Middle Bronze IB, Tell es-Sultan IVa2 (c. 1900-1800 BC)
- Middle Bronze IIA, Tell es-Sultan IVb1 (c. 1800-1700 BC)
- Middle Bronze IIB, Tell es-Sultan IVb2 (c. 1700-1650 BC)
- Middle Bronze IIC/III, Tell es-Sultan IVc (c. 1650-1550 BC)

=== Late Bronze Age ===
Decades after the destruction of the Middle Bronze Age city, it recovered again on a smaller scale during the Late Bronze Age (1450–1200 BC), with the previous Middle Bronze city wall being refurbished by adding a mudbrick wall on top of its emerging crest. Excavations have found a structure known as the "Middle Building" which apparently served as the residence of the city's local rulers, then vassals of the Egyptian empire. Ultimately, the Middle Building was destroyed, although it was later reused in the early Iron Age. According to Nigro (2023), the Late Bronze IIB layers of the tell were heavily cut by levelling operations during the Iron Age, which explains the scarcity of 13th century BCE materials.

Hebrew Bible narrative

The Hebrew Bible tells the story of the Battle of Jericho led by Joshua, leading to the fall of the Canaanite city, the first one captured by the Israelites in the Promised Land. The historicity of biblical account is not generally accepted by scholars. Lorenzo Nigro suggests that the story might have developed from local memories of the destructions suffered by the Canaanite city in the 3rd and 2nd millennia BCE, which were later used by the biblical writers to create their narrative.

=== Iron Age ===
Occupation in Tell es-Sultan appears to have resumed in the 11th century BCE, with the town becoming fortified again in the 10th century. Of this new city not much more remains than a four-room house on the eastern slope. By the 7th century, Jericho had become an extensive town, but this settlement was destroyed in the Babylonian conquest of Judah in the late 6th century.

=== Persian and Early Hellenistic periods ===
After the destruction of the Judahite city by the Babylonians in the late 6th century, whatever was rebuilt in the Persian period as part of the Restoration after the Babylonian captivity, left only very few remains. The tell was abandoned as a place of settlement not long after this period. During the Persian through Hellenistic periods, there is little in terms of occupation attested throughout the region.

Jericho went from being an administrative centre of Yehud Medinata ("the Province of Judah") under Persian rule to serving as the private estate of Alexander the Great between 336 and 323 BCE after his conquest of the region. In the middle of the 2nd century BCE Jericho was under Hellenistic rule of the Seleucid Empire, when the Syrian General Bacchides built a number of forts to strengthen the defences of the area around Jericho against the revolt by the Macabees. One of these forts, built at the entrance to Wadi Qelt, was later refortified by Herod the Great, who named it Kypros after his mother.

=== Hasmonean and Herodian periods ===
In the second half of the 2nd century BCE, Jericho became part of the kingdom of Judea, which was established by the Maccabees as a sovereign Jewish kingdom after gaining independence from the Seleucids. The kingdom was ruled by the Hasmoneans, a dynasty descending from a priestly family (kohanim) of the tribe of Levi. Around 135/134 BCE, the strategos of Jericho, Ptolemy son of Abubus, assassinated Hasmonean leader Simon Thassi, his father-in-law, at the nearby fortress of Duq.

The Hasmoneans constructed royal winter palaces at the site known as Tulul Abu el-'Alayiq. The new site of Jericho was established as a garden city around the palaces, consisting of a group of low mounds on both banks of Wadi Qelt. It is now believed that during the Second Temple period, houses spread across much of the valley. Several pools dating to the reign of Hasmonean king Alexander Jannaeus (r. c. 103–76 BCE) have been excavated at the palaces. The Hasmoneans also built aqueducts, which supplied water to the palaces and to a farming and workshop complex, showing evidence of the cultivation of balsam and persimmon, as well as the production of date wine. After the construction of the palaces, the city served not only as an agricultural center and a crossroads, but also as a winter resort for Jerusalem's aristocracy.

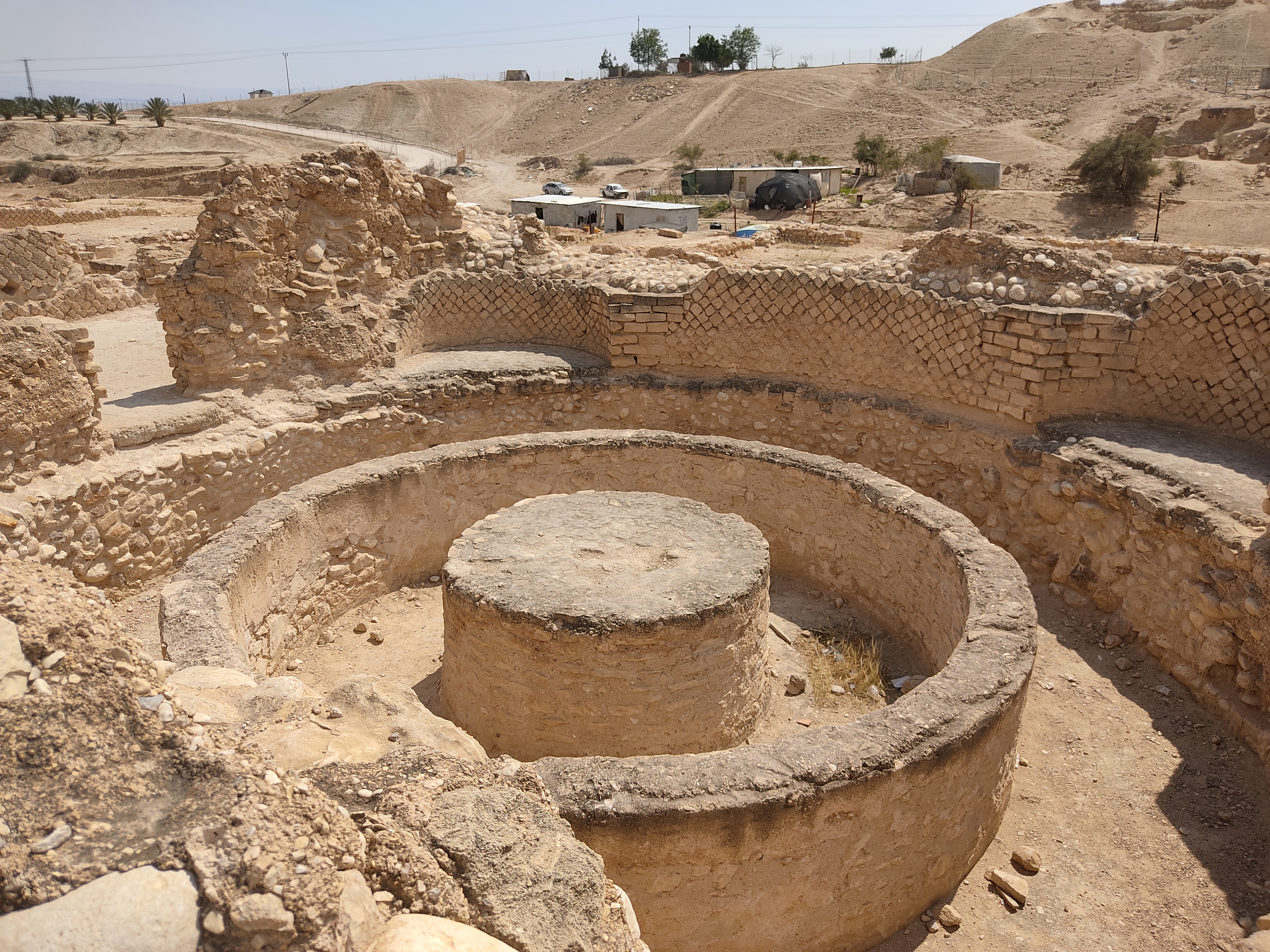
Remains from the Hasmonean and Herodian royal winter palaces at Jericho

In 63 BCE, during the Roman intervention in the Hasmonean succession war, Roman general Pompey passed through Jericho before advancing to besiege Jerusalem. After the city fell, the Jewish monarchy was abolished, and Judaea came under Roman oversight as a client territory. In 37 BCE, Herod began ruling Judea as a client kingdom of Rome. He initially leased the royal estate at Jericho from Cleopatra, to whom Mark Antony had granted it. Following their joint suicide in 30 BCE, Octavian assumed control of the Roman Empire and granted Herod full control over Jericho as part of his domain. Herod greatly expanded the royal domain in Jericho, constructing additional palaces. Excavations have uncovered the palaces themselves, a network of aqueducts, and the remains of an associated farm, as well as traces of residences for wealthy inhabitants. Herod also built a hippodrome-theatre (Tell es-Samrat) and built aqueducts to irrigate the lands below the cliffs, supplying water to his winter palaces at Tulul Abu el-Alaiq (also written ʾAlayiq). Herod is known to have ordered the drowning of Aristobulus III, the adolescent brother of his wife Mariamne I, in a pool within the Jericho palace, after the young high priest became too popular.

Following Herod's death, the palace at Jericho was plundered and set on fire during the ensuing unrest, but it was later rebuilt by his son and successor, Herod Archelaus, who also constructed an aqueduct from Naʿaran to Jericho. Herod Archelaus also built a village in his name not far to the north, Archelaïs (modern Khirbet al-Beiyudat), to house workers for his date plantation. The rock-cut tombs of a Herodian- and Hasmonean-era cemetery lie in the lowest part of the cliffs between Nuseib al-Aweishireh and Mount of Temptation. They date between 100 BCE and 68 CE.

==== In the New Testament ====
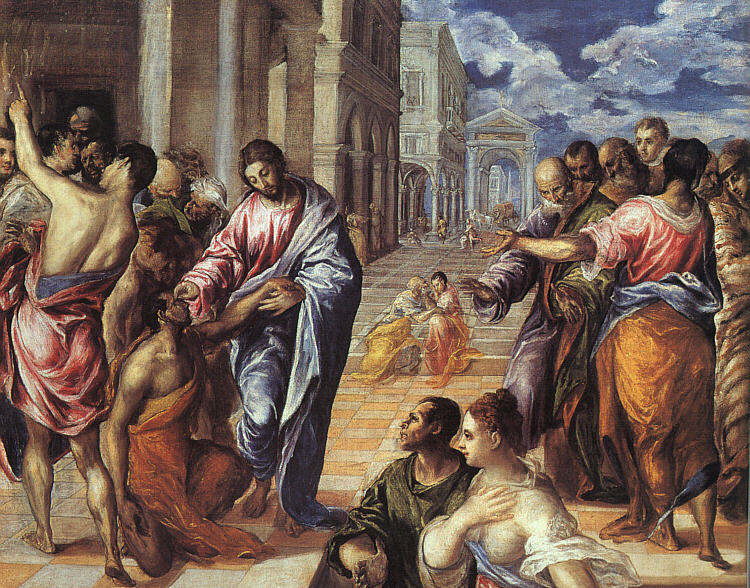
Christ Healing the Blind in Jericho, El Greco

The Christian Gospels state that Jesus of Nazareth passed through Jericho where he healed blind beggars (Matthew 20:29), and inspired a local chief tax collector named Zacchaeus to repent of his dishonest practices (Luke 19:1–10). The road between Jerusalem and Jericho is the setting for the Parable of the Good Samaritan.

John Wesley, in his New Testament Notes on this section of Luke's Gospel, claimed that "about twelve thousand priests and Levites dwelt there, who all attended the service of the temple".

Smith's Bible Names Dictionary suggests that "Jericho was once more 'a city of palms' when our Lord visited it. Here he restored sight to the blind (Matthew 20:30; Mark 10:46; Luke 18:35). Here the descendant of Rahab did not disdain the hospitality of Zacchaeus the publican. Finally, between Jerusalem and Jericho was laid the scene of his story of the good Samaritan."

=== Roman province ===
Josephus, a first-century CE Jewish historian from Jerusalem and a local of Judea, provides one of the most detailed ancient descriptions of Jericho, calling its district "the most fruitful country of Judea." He describes the area as rich in many types of date palms sustained by the Jericho spring, home to plentiful bees, and known for valuable plants such as balsam, cypress, and the myrobalanon, concluding that "it would not be a misnomer to describe as 'divine' this spot in which the rarest and choicest plants are produced in abundance." He also notes that Jericho was famed as the region "where they cultivate the palm tree and opobalsamum, that most excellent ointment, which, when the shrubs are cut with a sharp stone, oozes out like sap." Other classical writers also commented on the Jericho oasis. Greek historian Diodorus Siculus (1st century BCE) describes its palm trees and its production of balsam. Roman author Pliny the Elder writes that the most renowned palm trees in the area were found especially at Jericho. Greek geographer Strabo provides a detailed geographical description in his Geographica, writing that:

Jericho is a plain surrounded by a kind of mountainous country, which in a way, slopes toward it like a theatre. Here is the Phoenicon, which is mixed also with all kinds of cultivated and fruitful trees, though it consists mostly of palm trees. It is 100 stadia in length and is everywhere watered with streams. Here also are the Palace and the Balsam Park.

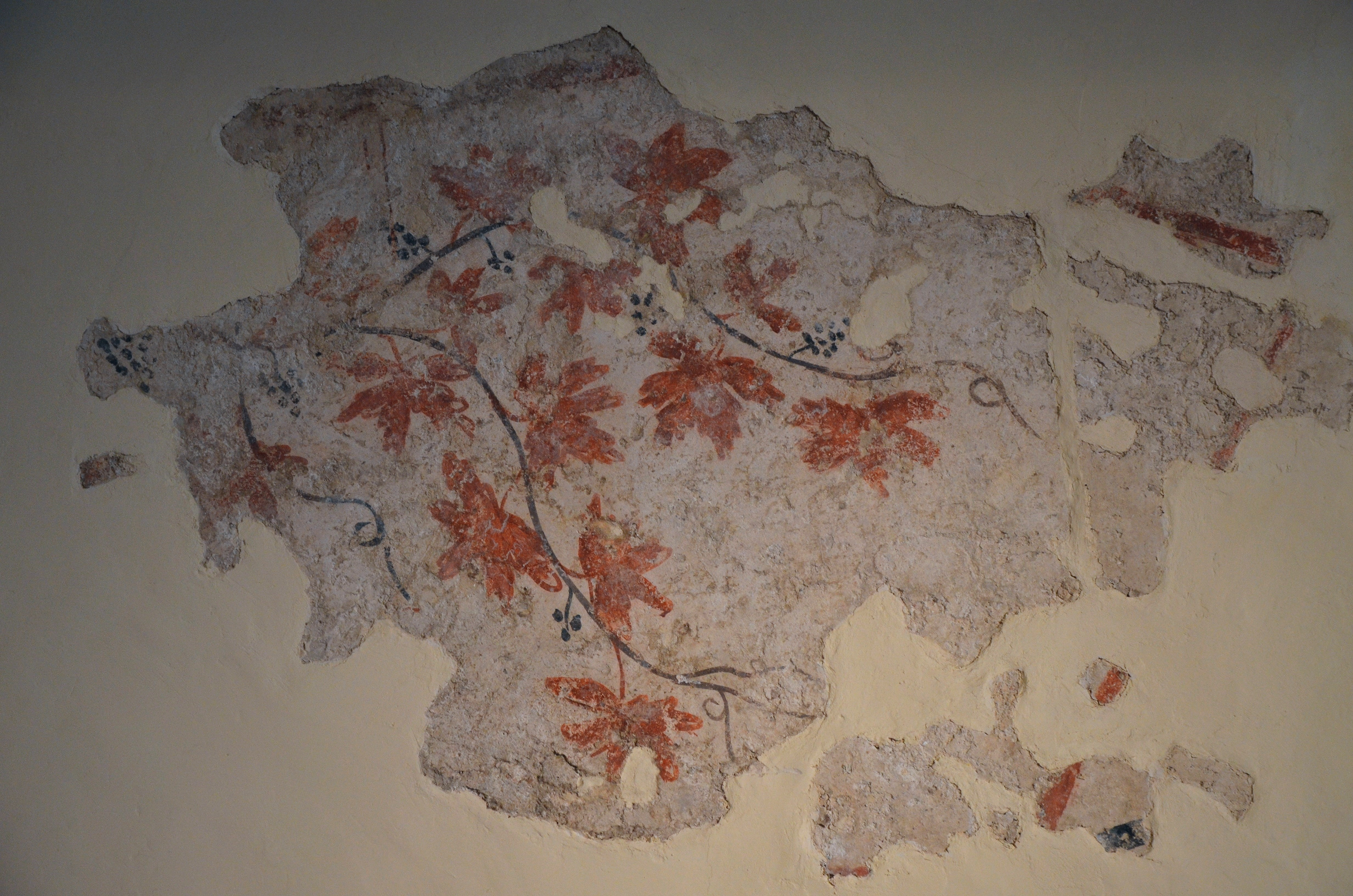
Fresco of a vine from the Goliath family tomb, Jewish cemetery of Roman-era Jericho

A large Jewish cemetery dated to the first century CE was found in excavations carried out west of classical-era Jericho. The most elaborate component is the multi-chambered "Goliath family tomb", a rock-cut complex that consists of two plastered chambers on different levels, connected by a staircase, with painted decoration in the upper chamber depicting a vine with grapes and birds. Across both chambers, excavators found 22 ossuaries, many decorated with rosettes typical of late Second Temple Jewish funerary art. Fourteen bear inscriptions in Greek, Hebrew and Aramaic (the last two using the square Jewish script). Some of the deceased are nicknamed "Goliath", a sobriquet likely referring to exceptional height. Recurring names such as Yoezer, El'azar, Salome/Shelamzion, and Maria point to family naming practices. One ossuary belonged to a certain Theodotus, identified as the freedman of Queen Agrippina, almost certainly Agrippina the Younger, thus dating his burial to 50–59 CE, before Nero's damnatio memoriae erased her name. Several ossuaries also preserve geographic identifiers, such as two children's ossuaries naming "Yoezer the Ezobite," possibly referring to a locality in Transjordan known from Josephus; they seem to be distinguished by the nickname "the cinnamon" attached to one of them.

Jericho appears to have played a strategically important role in the First Jewish Revolt (66–73 CE). At the outset of the uprising, the provisional government formed in Jerusalem appointed Joseph ben Shimon to command the defense of Jericho. In 68 CE, Vespasian's forces advanced through the Jericho region. Jewish survivors from the fighting in Perea had crossed the Jordan and sought refuge in Jericho, but by the time the Romans arrived it had been abandoned, its inhabitants having fled into the hills overlooking Jerusalem. Early in 70 CE, after Titus succeeded Vespasian in command, one division of his army passed through Jericho on its way to besiege Jerusalem. Following the city's fall later that year, Jericho declined quickly; by around 100 CE it had been reduced to a small Roman garrison settlement. A fort was erected there in 130 and is thought to have played a role in suppressing the Bar Kokhba revolt in 133.

=== Byzantine period ===
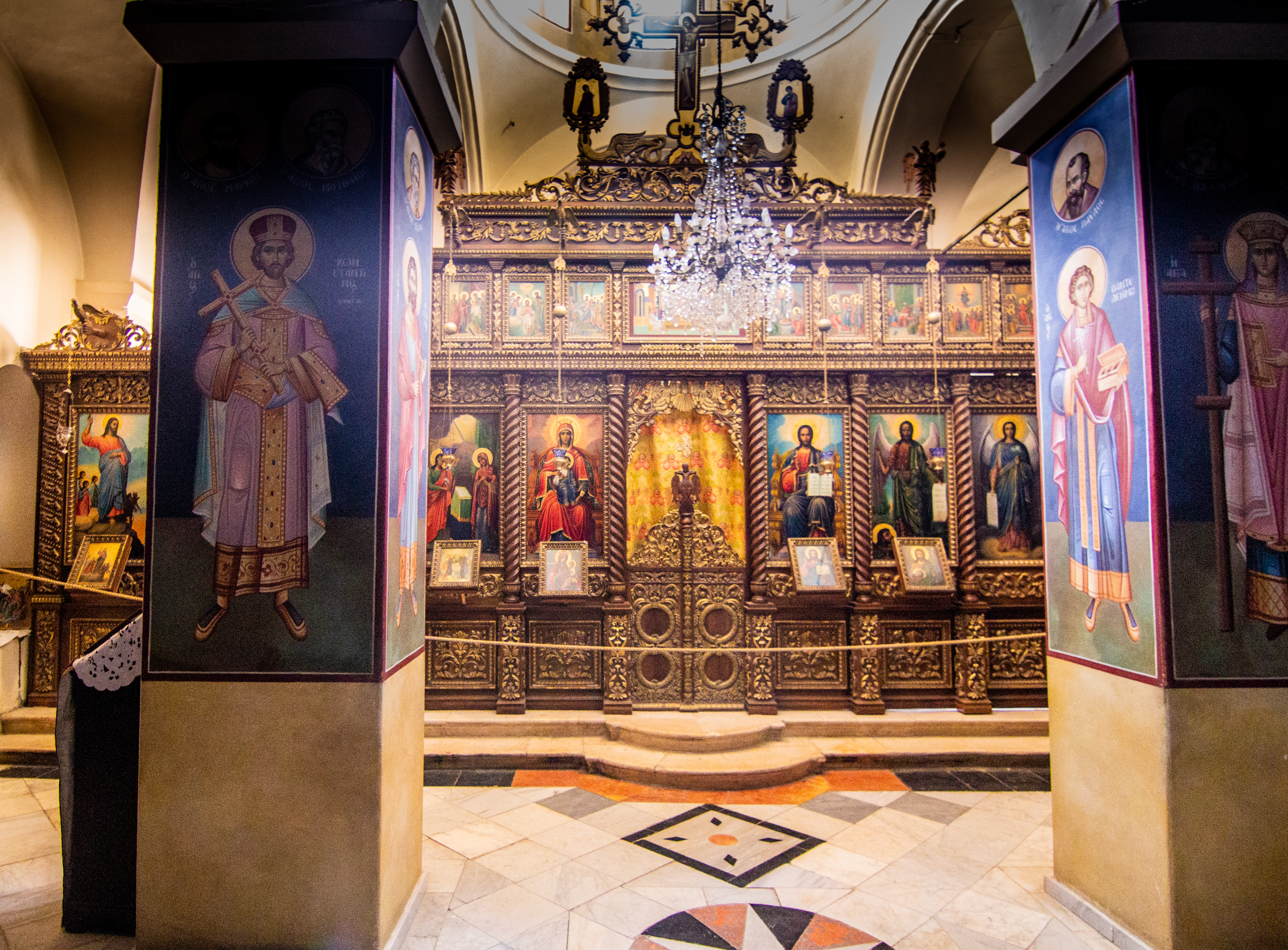
The Monastery of the Temptation (Dir Al-Qarantal)

Accounts of Jericho by a Christian pilgrim are given in 333. Shortly thereafter the built-up area of the town was abandoned and a Byzantine Jericho, Ericha, was built 1600 metres (1 mi) to the east, on which the modern town is centered. Christianity took hold in the city during the Byzantine era and the area was heavily populated. A number of monasteries and churches were built, including the Monastery of Saint George of Choziba in 340 CE and a domed church dedicated to Saint Eliseus. At least two synagogues were also built in the 6th century CE. The monasteries were abandoned after the Sasanian invasion of 614.

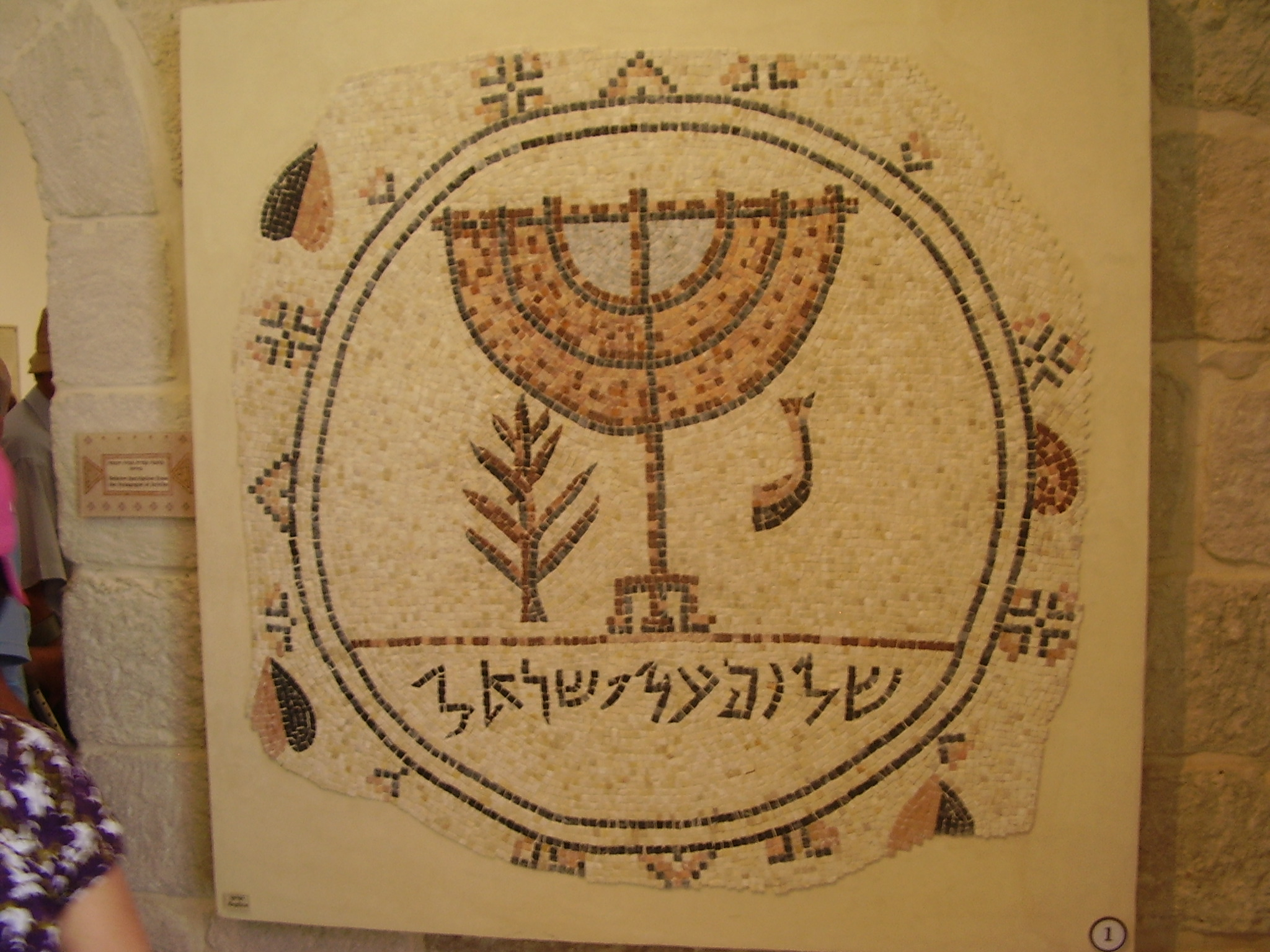
Copy of the mosaic from the Jericho synagogue, showing the Hebrew inscription "Peace upon Israel", 6th–7th century CE)

In late antiquity, Jericho also hosted a Jewish community whose presence is attested by the Jericho synagogue, also known as the "Shalom 'al Yisrael" synagogue, discovered just north of the Byzantine-era settlement, and 500 meters northeast of Tell el-Sultan. The synagogue's basilical hall featured geometric pavements and a central medallion bearing the Hebrew inscription "Peace upon Israel", alongside characteristic Jewish motifs including the menorah, lulav and shofar, as well as a donor inscription in Aramaic. The building appears to have been constructed in two phases during the late Byzantine or early Islamic periods, remaining in use for some time before being hastily abandoned in the 8th century.

The artistic program of the Jericho synagogue shares close parallels with the nearby Na'aran synagogue, located approximately 3.2 kilometers northwest of the Jericho synagogue, near the springs of Nu'eima and Duk. Its complex included a multi-room basilical synagogue, while its interior featured a large mosaic with geometric panels, a zodiac cycle, a Torah-shrine flanked by menorahs, animal motifs, and numerous Aramaic dedicatory inscriptions naming donors. It suffered iconoclastic damage to most figural elements. Finds from adjacent structures indicate that this synagogue and its settlement flourished in the 6th century and remained active into the early Islamic period before their abrupt destruction, probably by fire, in the 8th century. Rabbinic texts from late antiquity mention hostilities between the Jews of Na'aran and Christians from Jericho.

=== Early Muslim period ===
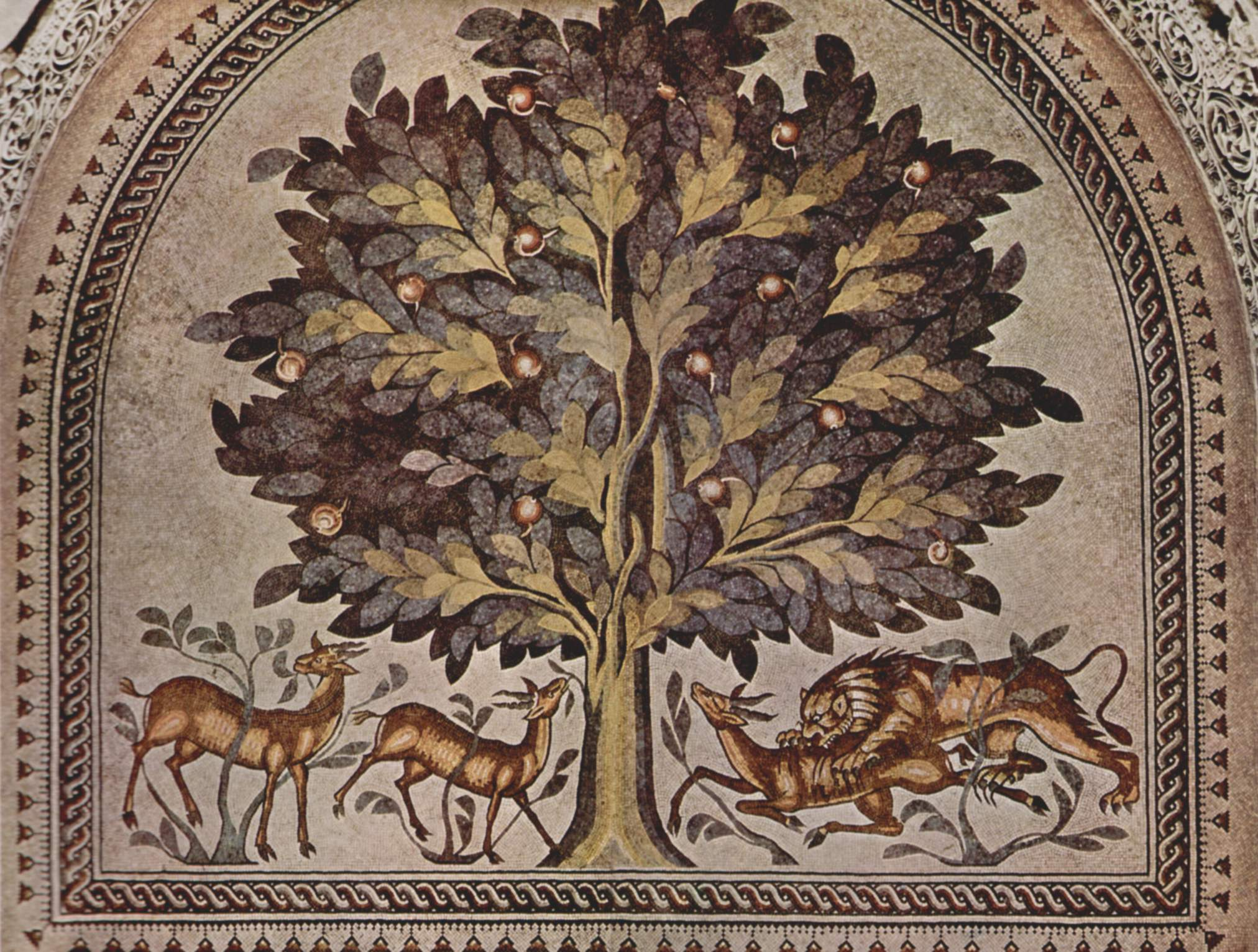
Arabic Umayyad mosaic from Hisham's Palace in Jericho

Jericho, by then named "Ariha" in Arabic variation, became part of Jund Filastin ("Military District of Palestine"), part of the larger province of Bilad al-Sham. The Arab Muslim historian Musa b. 'Uqba (died 758) recorded that caliph Umar ibn al-Khattab exiled the Jews and Christians of Khaybar to Jericho (and Tayma).

By 659, that district had come under the control of Mu'awiya, founder of the Umayyad dynasty. That year, an earthquake destroyed Jericho. A decade later, the pilgrim Arculf visited Jericho and found it in ruins, all its "miserable Canaanite" inhabitants now dispersed in shanty towns around the Dead Sea shore.

A palatial complex long attributed to the tenth Umayyad caliph, Hisham ibn Abd al-Malik (r. 724–743) and thus known as Hisham's Palace, is located at Khirbet al-Mafjar, about 1.5 kilometres (1 mi) north of Tell es-Sultan. This "desert castle" or qasr was more likely built by Caliph Walid ibn Yazid (r. 743–744), who was assassinated before he could complete the construction. The remains of two mosques, a courtyard, mosaics, and other items can still be seen in situ today. The unfinished structure was largely destroyed in an earthquake in 747.

Umayyad rule ended in 750 and was followed by the Arab caliphates of the Abbasid and Fatimid dynasties. Irrigated agriculture was developed under Islamic rule, reaffirming Jericho's reputation as a fertile "City of the Palms". Al-Maqdisi, the Arab geographer, wrote in 985 that "the water of Jericho is held to be the highest and best in all Islam. Bananas are plentiful, also dates and flowers of fragrant odor". Jericho is also referred to by him as one of the principal cities of Jund Filastin.

=== Crusader period ===
In 1179, the Crusaders rebuilt the Monastery of St. George of Koziba, at its original site 10 km (6 mi) from the center of town. They also built another two churches and a monastery dedicated to John the Baptist, and were credited by 19th-century authors with introducing sugarcane production to the city, although now scholars date it to the pre-Crusader, Early Arab period. The Crusaders, however, have raised sugar production to the level of a large-scale industry. The site of Tawahin es-Sukkar (lit. "sugar mills") holds remains of a Crusader sugar production facility. In 1187, the Crusaders were evicted by the Ayyubid forces of Saladin after their victory in the Battle of Hattin and the town slowly went into decline.

=== Ayyubid and Mamluk periods ===
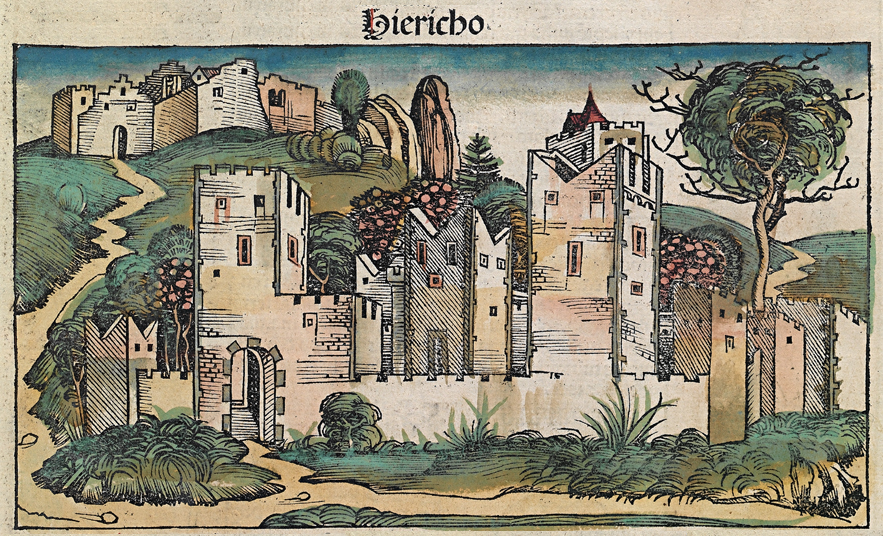
Jericho, as depicted in the 1493 Nuremberg Chronicle

In 1226, Arab geographer Yaqut al-Hamawi said of Jericho, "it has many palm trees, also sugarcane in quantities, and bananas. The best of all the sugar in the Ghaur land is made here." In the 14th century, Abu al-Fida writes that there are sulfur mines in Jericho, "the only ones in Palestine".

=== Ottoman period ===
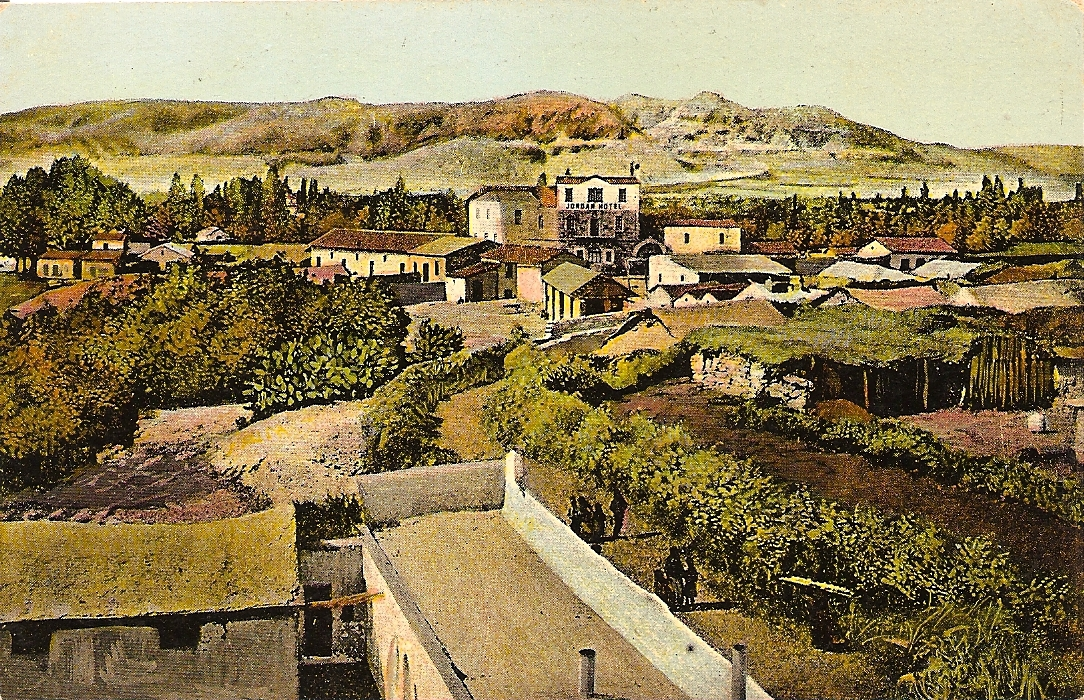
Postcard image depicting Jericho in the late 19th or early 20th century

==== 16th century ====
Jericho was incorporated into the Ottoman Empire in 1517 with all of Palestine, and in 1545 a revenue of 19,000 Akçe was recorded, destined for the new Waqf for the Haseki Sultan Imaret of Jerusalem. The villagers processed indigo as one source of revenue, using a cauldron specifically for this purpose that was loaned to them by the Ottoman authorities in Jerusalem. Later that century, the Jericho revenues no longer went to the Haseki Sultan Imaret.

In 1596 Jericho appeared in the tax registers under the name of Riha, being in the nahiya of Al-Quds in the liwa of Al-Quds. It had a population of 51 households, all Muslims. They paid a fixed tax-rate of 33.3% on agricultural products, including wheat, barley, summer crops, vineyards and fruit trees, goats and beehives, water buffaloes, in addition to occasional revenues; a total of 40,000 Akçe. All of the revenue still went to a Waqf.

==== 17th century ====
The French traveller Laurent d'Arvieux described the city in 1659 as "now desolate, and consists only of about fifty poor houses, in bad condition ... The plain around is extremely fertile; the soil is middling fat; but it is watered by several rivulets, which flow into the Jordan. Notwithstanding these advantages only the gardens adjacent to the town are cultivated."

==== 19th century ====
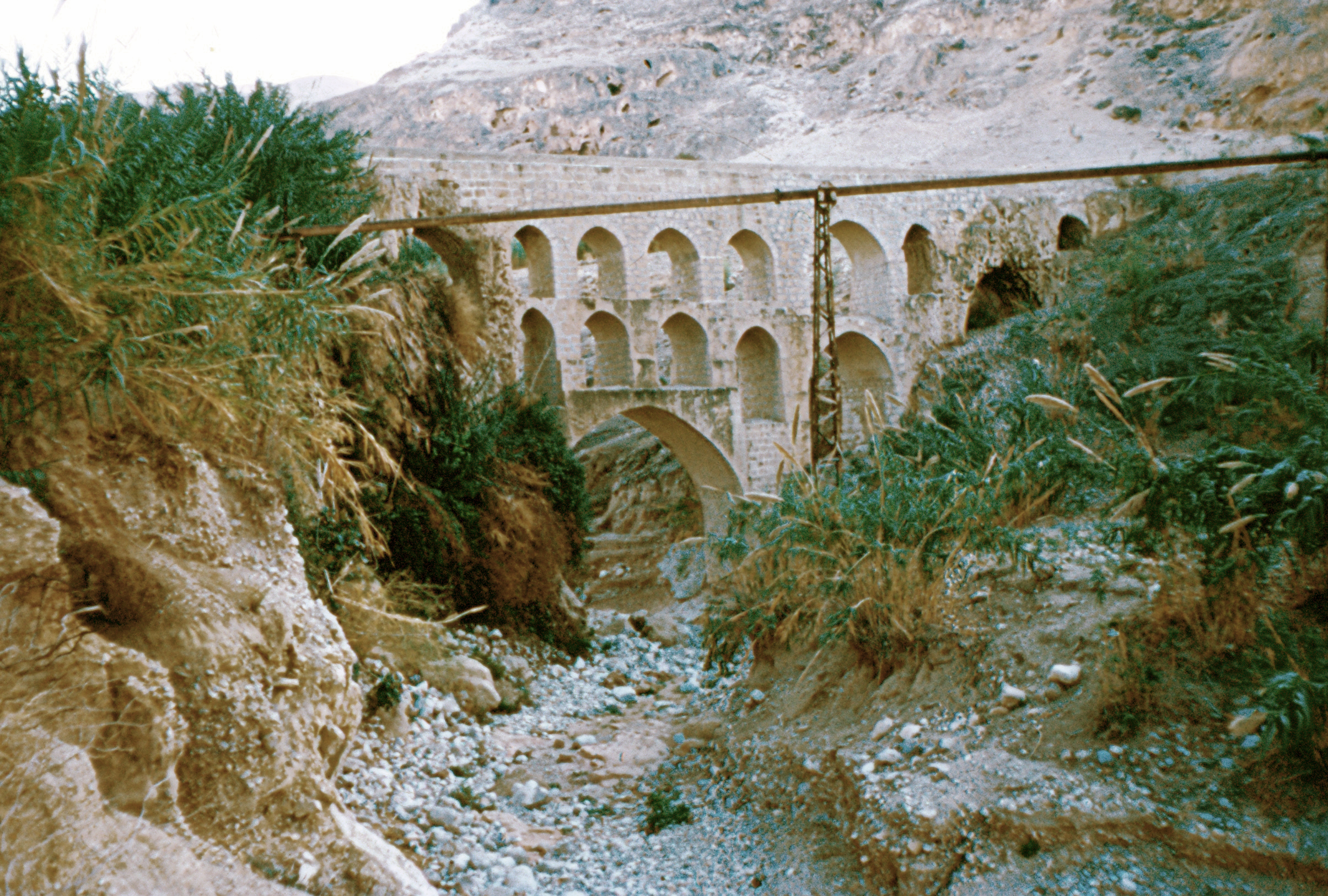
Roman aqueducts

In the 19th century, European scholars, archaeologists and missionaries visited often. At the time it was an oasis in a poor state, similar to other regions in the plains and deserts. Edward Robinson (1838) reported 50 families, which were about 200 people, Titus Tobler (1854) reported some 30 poor huts, whose residents paid a total of 3611 kuruş in tax. Abraham Samuel Herschberg (1858–1943) also reported after his 1899–1900 travels in the region of some 30 poor huts and 300 residents. At that time, Jericho was the residence of the region's Turkish governor. The main water sources for the village were a spring called Ein al-Sultan, lit. "Sultan's Spring", in Arabic and Ein Elisha, lit. "Elisha Spring", in Hebrew, and springs in Wadi Qelt.

J. S. Buckingham (1786–1855) describes in his 1822 book how the male villagers of er-Riha, although nominally sedentary, engaged in Bedouin-style raiding, or ghazzu: the little land cultivation he observed was done by women and children, while men spent most of their time riding through the plains and engaging in "robbery and plunder", their main and most profitable activity.

An Ottoman village list from around 1870 showed that Riha, Jericho, had 36 houses and a population of 105, though the population count included men only.

The first excavation at Tell es-Sultan was carried out in 1867.

==== 20th century ====
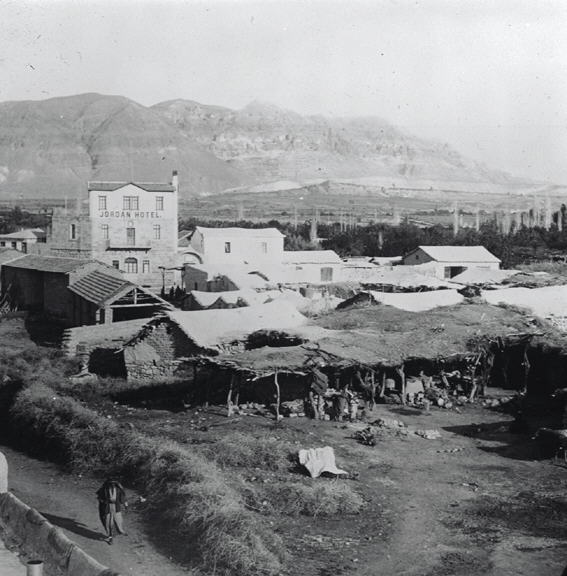
Jericho, the Jordan Hotel, 1912

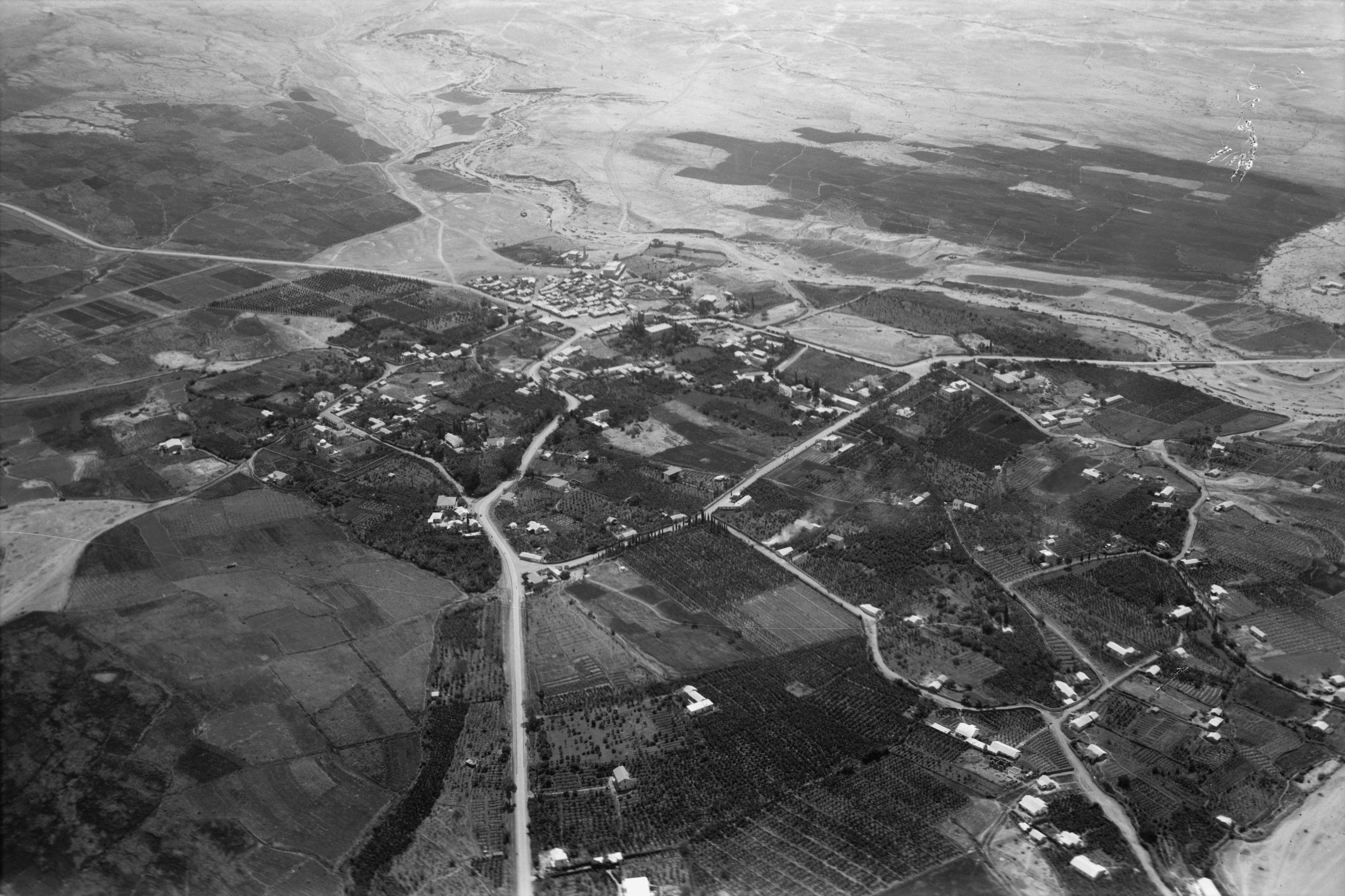
Jericho from the air in 1931

In Jericho and the Jordan Valley, the Greek Orthodox Patriarchate of Jerusalem acquired estates that supported agricultural development and served as symbols of its renewed presence in the countryside. The Greek Orthodox monasteries of St. George of Choziba and John the Baptist were refounded and completed in 1901 and 1904, respectively.

=== British Mandate period ===
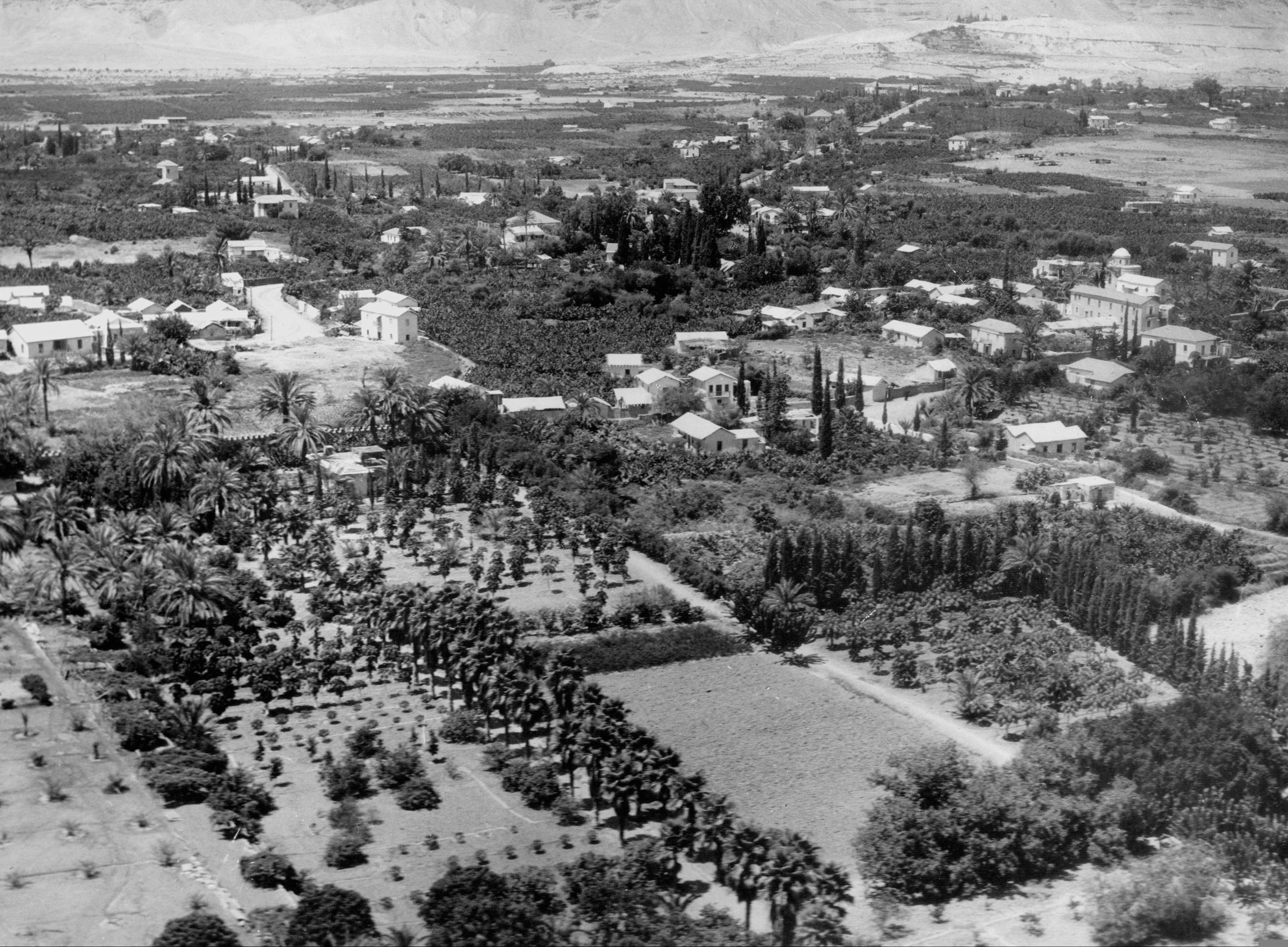
Jericho 1938

After the collapse of the Ottoman Empire at the end of World War I, Jericho came under British rule, as part of Mandatory Palestine.

According to the 1922 census of Palestine, Jericho had 1,029 inhabitants (931 Muslims, 92 Christians, and six Jews). The Christian population consisted of 45 Orthodox, 12 Roman Catholics, 13 Greek Catholics (Melkite Catholics), 6 Syrian Catholic, 11 Armenians, four Copts and one Church of England.

In 1927, an earthquake struck and affected Jericho and other cities. Around 300 people died, but by the 1931 census the population had increased to 1,693 inhabitants (1,512 Muslims, 170 Christians, seven Druze, and four Jews), in 347 houses.

In the 1938 statistics, Jericho lists a population of 1,996 people (including five Jews).

In the 1945 statistics, Jericho's population was 3,010 (2,570 Muslims, 260 Christians, 170 Jews, and 10 "other") and it had jurisdiction over 37,481 dunams of land. Of this, 948 dunams were used for citrus and bananas, 5,873 dunams were for plantations and irrigable land, 9,141 for cereals, while a total of 38 dunams were urban, built-up areas.

During World War II The British built fortresses in Jericho with the help of the Jewish company Solel Boneh, and bridges were rigged with explosives in preparation for a possible invasion by German allied forces.

=== Jordanian period ===
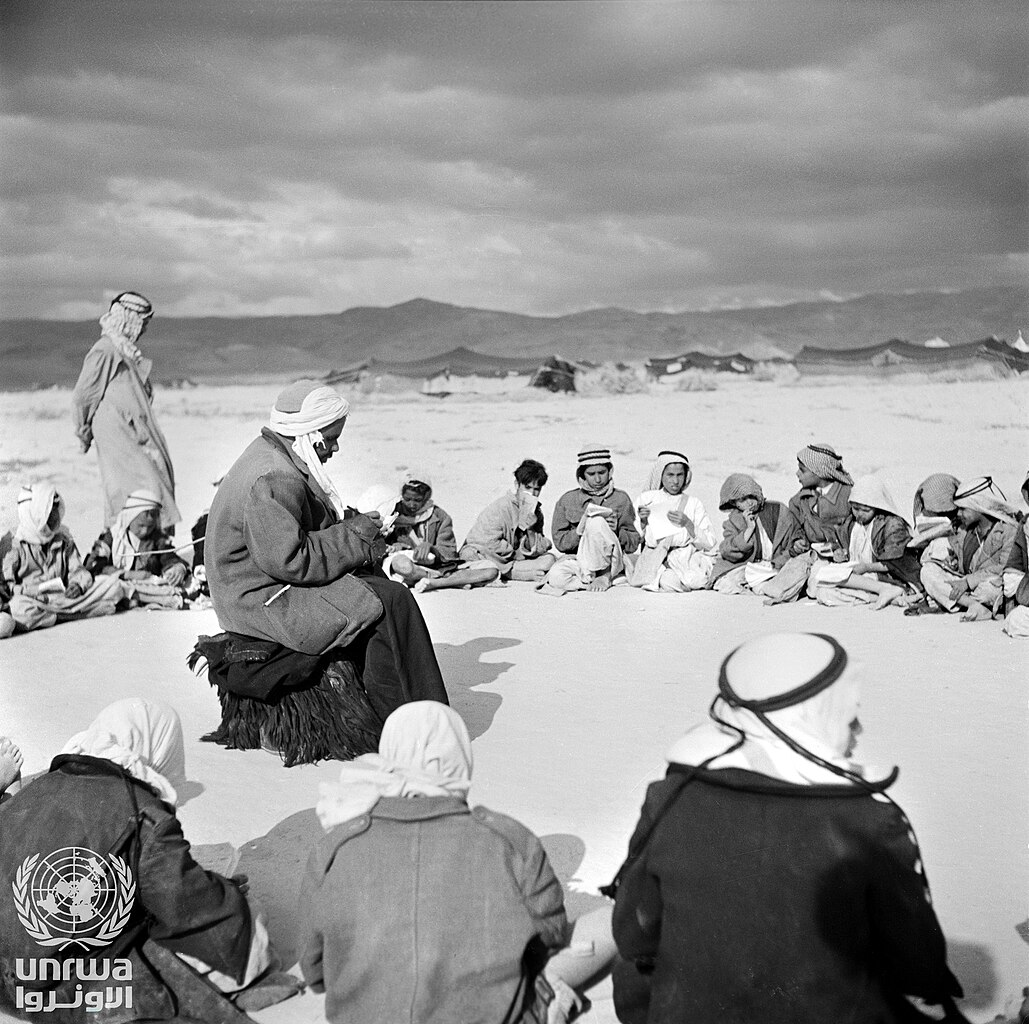
School classes for Palestinian refugees who were displaced to Jericho in the wake of the 1948 Nakba

Jericho came under Jordanian control after the 1948 Arab–Israeli War. The Jericho Conference, organized by King Abdullah and attended by over 2,000 Palestinian delegates in 1948 proclaimed "His Majesty Abdullah as King of all Palestine" and called for "the unification of Palestine and Transjordan as a step toward full Arab unity". In mid-1950, Jordan formally annexed the West Bank and Jericho residents, like other residents of West Bank localities became Jordanian citizens.

In 1961, the population of Jericho was 10,166, of whom 935 were Christian, and the rest were Muslim.

=== 1967 and aftermath ===
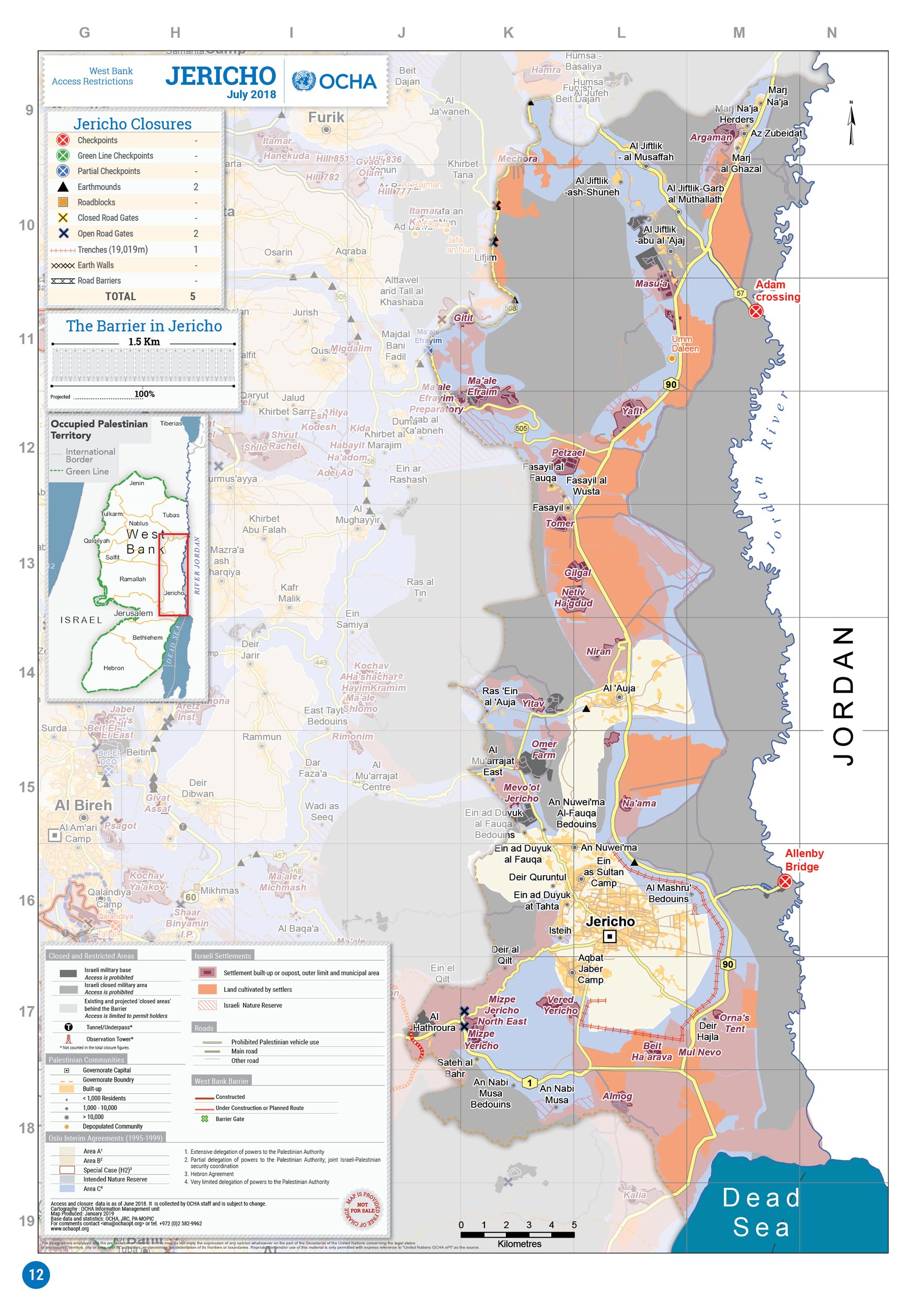
2018 United Nations map of the area, showing the Israeli occupation arrangements

Jericho has been occupied by Israel since the Six-Day War of 1967 along with the rest of the West Bank. It was the first city handed over to Palestinian Authority control in accordance with the Oslo Accords. The limited Palestinian self-rule of Jericho was agreed on in the Gaza–Jericho Agreement of 4 May 1994. Part of the agreement was a "Protocol on Economic Relations", signed on 29 April 1994. The city is in an enclave of the Jordan Valley that is in Area A of the West Bank, while the surrounding area is designated as being in Area C under full Israeli military control. Four roadblocks encircle the enclave, restricting Jericho's Palestinian population's movement through the West Bank.

The Jericho synagogue was controlled by Israel after the Six-Day War, but after the handover to Palestinian Authority control per the Oslo Accords, it has been a source of conflict. On the night of 12 October 2000, the synagogue was vandalized by Palestinians who burned holy books and relics and damaged the mosaic.

In response to the 2001 Second Intifada and suicide bombings, Jericho was re-occupied by Israeli troops. A 2 m (6 ft 7 in) deep trench was built around a large part of the city to control Palestinian traffic to and from Jericho.

On 14 March 2006, the Israel Defense Forces launched Operation Bringing Home the Goods, raiding a Jericho prison to capture the PFLP general secretary, Ahmad Sa'adat, and five other prisoners, all of whom had been charged with assassinating the Israeli tourist minister Rehavam Zeevi in 2001.

After Hamas assaulted a neighborhood in Gaza mostly populated by the Fatah-aligned Hilles clan, in response to their attack that killed six Hamas members, the Hilles clan was relocated to Jericho on 4 August 2008.

In 2009, Palestinian Authority Prime Minister Salam Fayyad and U.S. Assistant Secretary of State for International Narcotics and Law Enforcement Affairs David Johnson inaugurated the Presidential Guard Training Center in Jericho, a $9.1 million training facility for Palestinian Authority security forces built with U.S. funding. In 2024, a Jericho street was named after Aaron Bushnell, a U.S. soldier who self-immolated in support of Palestine.

The city had a population of 20,907 in 2017.

== Geography and environment ==
Jericho is located 258 m (846 ft) below sea level in an oasis in Wadi Qelt in the Jordan Valley, which makes it the lowest city in the world. The nearby spring of Ein es-Sultan produces 3.8 m^{3} (1,000 gallons) of water per minute, irrigating some 10 square kilometres (2,500 acres) through multiple channels and feeding into the Jordan River, 10 kilometres (6 mi) away.

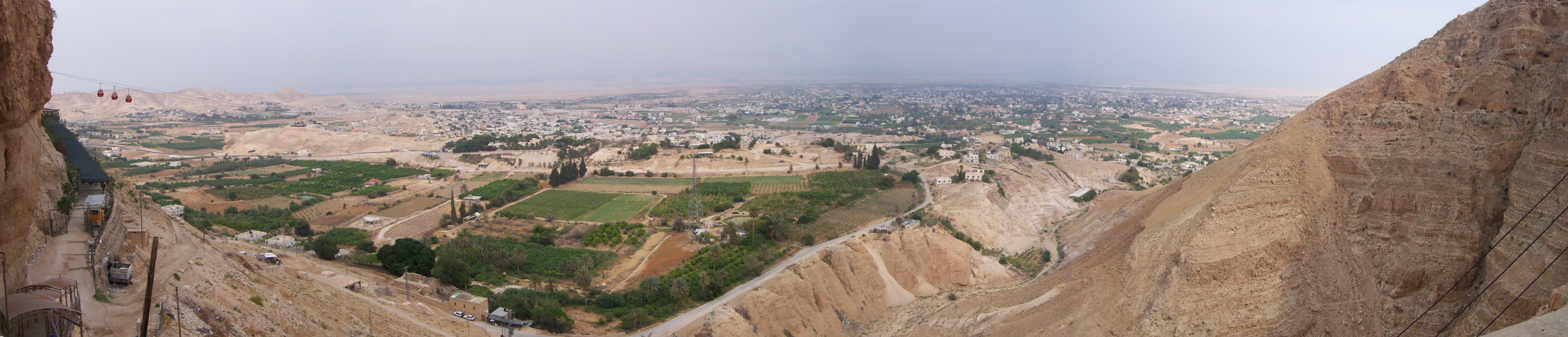
Panorama of Jericho

=== Important Bird Area ===
A 3,500 ha (8,600-acre) site encompassing the city of Jericho and its immediate surrounds has been recognised as an Important Bird Area (IBA) by BirdLife International because it supports populations of black francolins, lanner falcons, lesser kestrels, and Dead Sea sparrows.

=== Climate ===
Annual rainfall is 204 mm (8.0 in), mostly concentrated in the winter months and into early spring. The average temperature is 11 °C (52 °F) in January and 31 °C (88 °F) in July. According to the Köppen climate classification, Jericho has a hot desert climate (BWh). Rich alluvial soil and abundant spring water have made Jericho an attractive place for settlement.

Climate data for Jericho
Month	Jan	Feb	Mar	Apr	May	Jun	Jul	Aug	Sep	Oct	Nov	Dec	Year
Record high °C (°F)	25.0 (77.0)	27.6 (81.7)	33.8 (92.8)	41.4 (106.5)	46.4 (115.5)	45.0 (113.0)	44.0 (111.2)	45.6 (114.1)	43.4 (110.1)	40.6 (105.1)	34.8 (94.6)	28.8 (83.8)	46.4 (115.5)
Mean daily maximum °C (°F)	19.0 (66.2)	20.6 (69.1)	24.4 (75.9)	29.5 (85.1)	34.4 (93.9)	37.0 (98.6)	38.6 (101.5)	37.9 (100.2)	35.8 (96.4)	32.7 (90.9)	28.1 (82.6)	21.4 (70.5)	30.0 (86.0)
Daily mean °C (°F)	10.7 (51.3)	12.6 (54.7)	16.3 (61.3)	22.4 (72.3)	26.6 (79.9)	30.4 (86.7)	30.9 (87.6)	30.4 (86.7)	28.6 (83.5)	25.8 (78.4)	22.8 (73.0)	16.9 (62.4)	22.9 (73.2)
Mean daily minimum °C (°F)	4.4 (39.9)	5.9 (42.6)	9.6 (49.3)	13.6 (56.5)	18.2 (64.8)	20.2 (68.4)	21.9 (71.4)	21.1 (70.0)	20.5 (68.9)	17.6 (63.7)	16.6 (61.9)	11.6 (52.9)	15.1 (59.2)
Record low °C (°F)	0.2 (32.4)	−0.4 (31.3)	2.8 (37.0)	2.4 (36.3)	10.4 (50.7)	15.4 (59.7)	18.0 (64.4)	19.0 (66.2)	13.2 (55.8)	11.4 (52.5)	4.2 (39.6)	2.1 (35.8)	−0.4 (31.3)
Average precipitation mm (inches)	59 (2.3)	44 (1.7)	20 (0.8)	4 (0.2)	1 (0.0)	0 (0)	0 (0)	1 (0.0)	2 (0.1)	3 (0.1)	5 (0.2)	65 (2.6)	204 (8.0)
Average rainy days	9.3	8.6	6.7	2.7	2.1	1.0	0.0	0.0	1.5	2.6	5.2	7.4	47.1
Average relative humidity (%)	77	81	74	62	49	50	51	57	52	56	54	74	61
Mean monthly sunshine hours	189.1	186.5	244.9	288.0	362.7	393.0	418.5	396.8	336.0	294.5	249.0	207.7	3,566.7
Mean daily sunshine hours	6.1	6.6	7.9	9.6	11.7	13.1	13.5	12.8	11.2	9.5	8.3	6.7	9.8
Source 1: Arab Meteorology Book
Source 2: Palestinian Meteorological Department (extremes, rainy days)

== Demographics ==
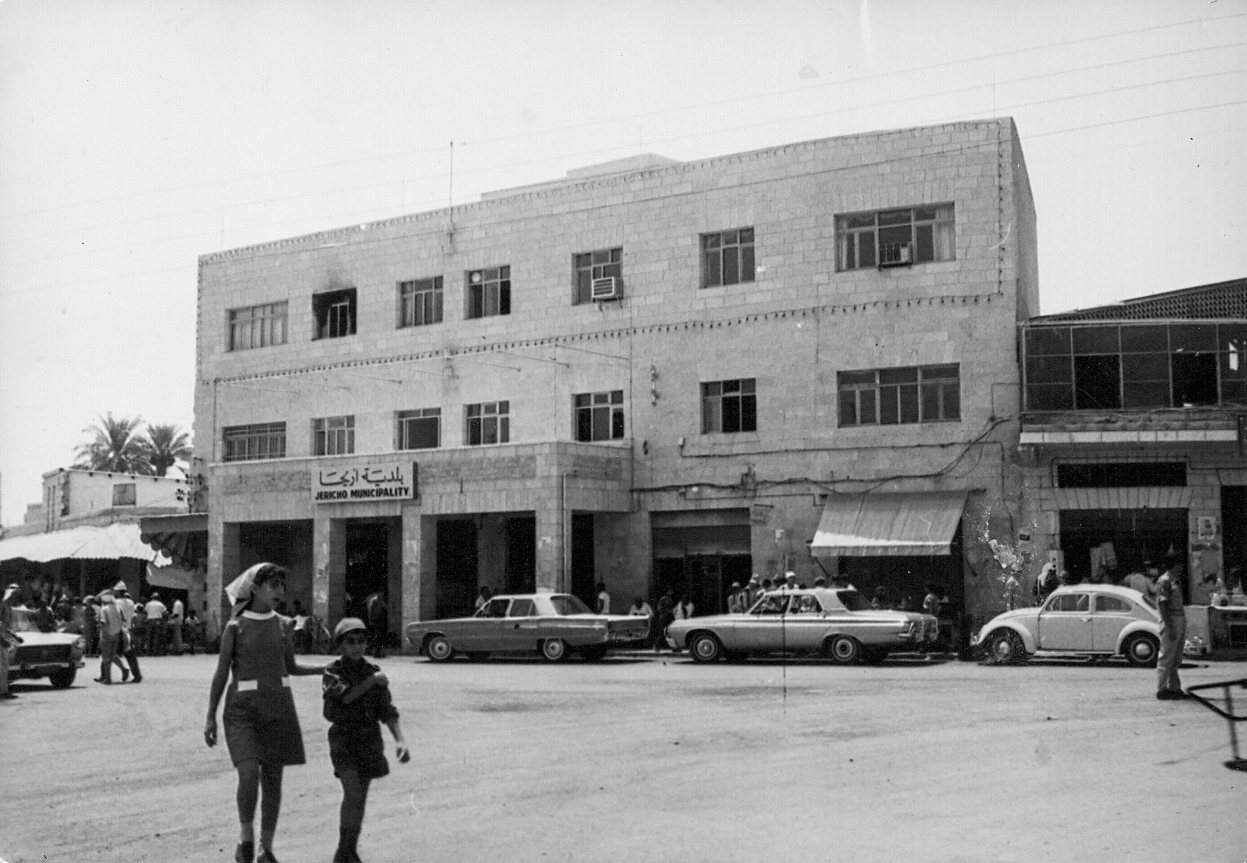
Municipality of Jericho, 1967

In the first census carried out by the Palestinian Central Bureau of Statistics (PCBS), in 1997, Jericho's population was 14,674. Palestinian refugees constituted 43.6% of the residents or 6,393 people. The gender make-up of the city was 51% male and 49% female. Jericho has a young population, with nearly half (49.2%) of the inhabitants being under the age of 20. People between the ages of 20 and 44 made up 36.2% of the population, 10.7% between the ages of 45 and 64, and 3.6% were over the age of 64. In the 2007 census by the PCBS, Jericho had a population of 18,346.

In a 1945 land and population survey by Sami Hadawi, 3,010 inhabitants is the figure given for Jericho, of which 94% (2840) were Arab and 6% (170) were Jews. Today, the overwhelming majority of the population is Muslim. The Christian community makes up around 1% of the population. A large community of black Palestinians lives in Jericho.

== Economy ==
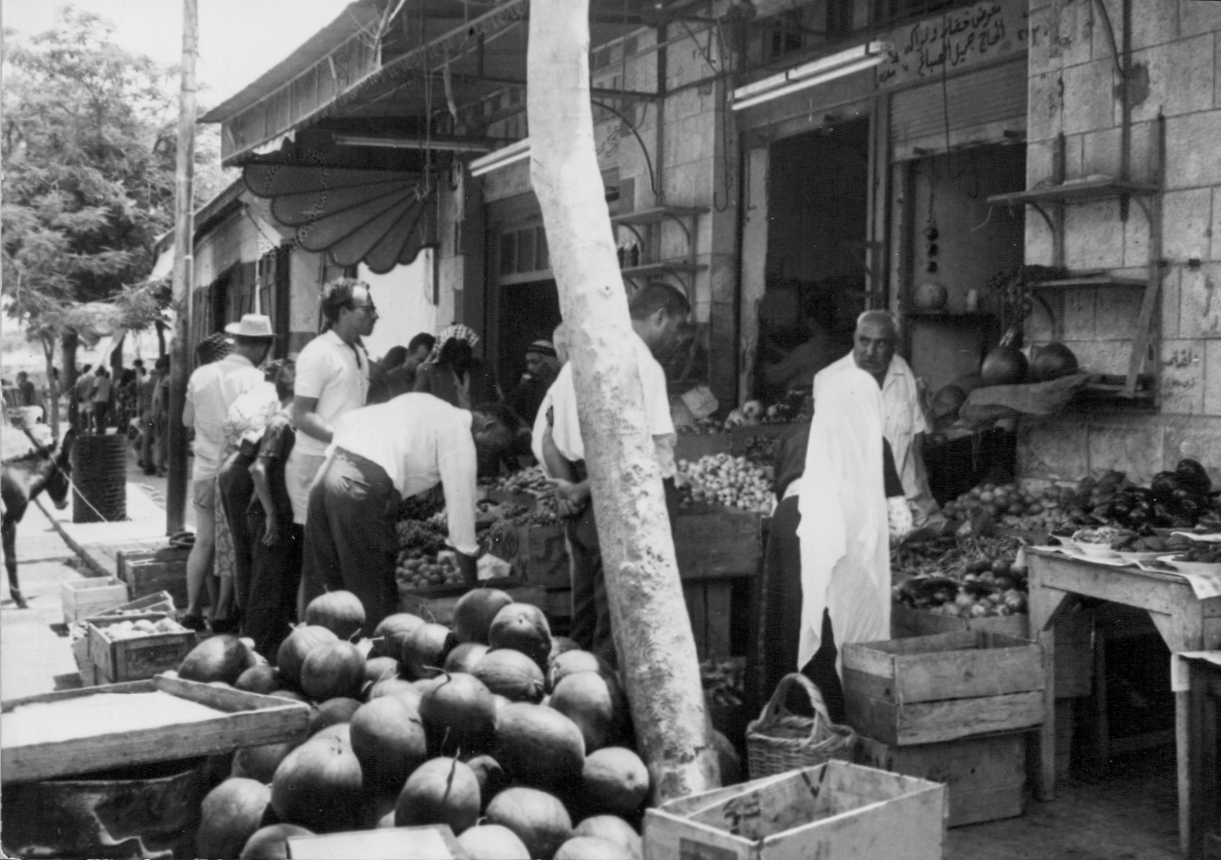
Jericho marketplace, 1967

In 1994, Israel and Palestine signed an economic accord that enabled Palestinians in Jericho to open banks, collect taxes and engage in export and import in preparation for self-rule. Agriculture is another source of income, with banana groves ringing the city.

The Jericho Agro-Industrial Park is a public-private enterprise being developed in the Jericho area. Agricultural processing companies are being offered financial concessions to lease plots of land in the park in a bid to boost Jericho's economy.

== Tourism ==
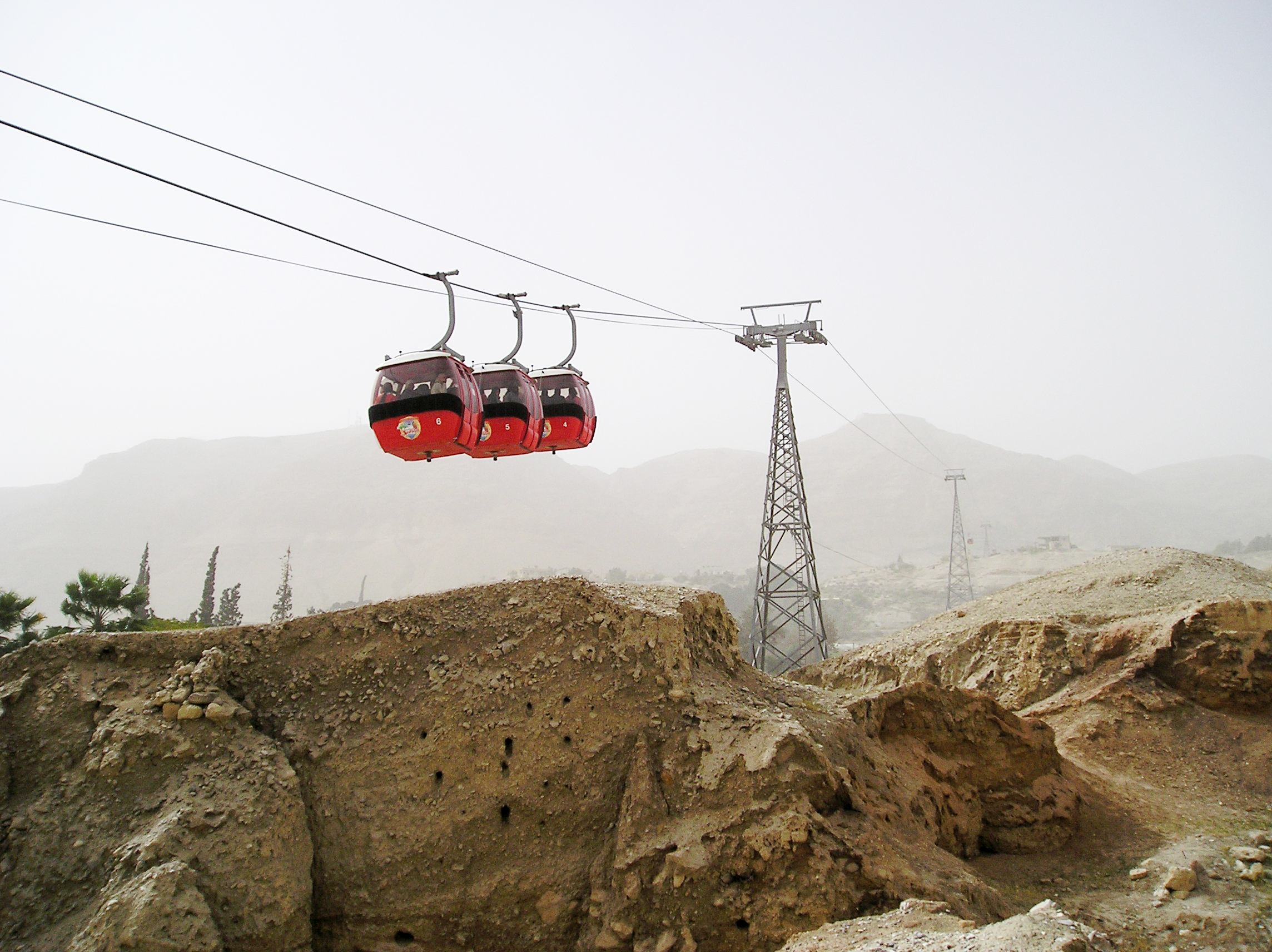
Jericho cable car

In 1998, a $150 million casino-hotel was built in Jericho with the backing of Yasser Arafat. The casino is now closed, though the hotel on the premises is open for guests.

In 2010, Jericho, with its proximity to the Dead Sea, was declared the most popular destination among Palestinian tourists.

=== Biblical and Christian landmarks ===
Christian tourism is one of Jericho's primary sources of income. There are several major Christian pilgrimage sites in and around Jericho.

- Ein es-Sultan, known as the Spring of Elisha to Jews and Christians;
- Qasr al-Yahud on the Jordan River, across from Bethany beyond the Jordan, traditionally identified as the location of the baptism of Jesus;
- Mount of Temptation (Jebel Quruntul), traditionally identified as the location of the Temptation of Jesus;
- The Greek Orthodox Monastery of the Temptation halfway up the mountain, beside a cave said to be the location where Jesus fasted for 40 days. It is connected to Jericho by a cable car;
- 2 sycamore trees, both identified as the one mentioned in relation to Zacchaeus;
- Deir Hajla, the monastery of St. Gerasimos in the Jordan Valley near Jericho;
- Saint George Monastery in Wadi Qelt above Jericho.

=== Archaeological landmarks ===
- Stone, Bronze and Iron Age cities at Tell es-Sultan;
- Hasmonean and Herodian winter palaces at Tulul Abu el-'Alayiq;
- Byzantine-period synagogues at Jericho (Shalom Al Yisrael Synagogue) and Na'aran;
- Umayyad palace at Khirbet al-Mafjar known as Hisham's Palace;
- Crusader sugar production facility at Tawahin es-Sukkar (lit. "sugar mills");
- Nabi Musa, the Mamluk and Ottoman shrine claimed to be the resting place of Moses ("Prophet Musa" to the Muslims)

== Schools and religious institutions ==
In 1925, Christian friars opened a school for 100 pupils that became the Terra Santa School. The city has 22 state schools and a number of private schools.

== Health care ==
In April 2010, the United States Agency for International Development (USAID) held a groundbreaking ceremony for the renovation of the Jericho Governmental Hospital. USAID is providing $2.5 million in funding for this project.

== Sports ==
The sports team Hilal Areeha plays association football in the West Bank First Division. They play home games in the 15,000-spectator Jericho International Stadium.

== Twin towns and sister cities ==
Jericho is twinned with:

- Alessandria, Italy (2004)
- Campinas, Brazil (2001)
- Eger, Hungary (2013)
- Estación Central, Chile (2007)
- Fez, Morocco (2014)
- Foz do Iguaçu, Brazil (2012)
- Iași, Romania (2003)
- Ilion, Greece (1999)
- Kragujevac, Serbia (2011)
- Lærdal, Norway (1998)
- Pisa, Italy (2000)
- San Giovanni Valdarno, Italy (2004)
- Santa Bárbara, Brazil (1998)
- Al-Shuna al-Shamalyah, Jordan (2016)

== Notable people ==
- Musa Alami

== See also ==
- Ancient underground quarry, Jordan Valley, some 5 km (3 mi) north of Jericho
- al-Auja, Jericho, a Palestinian village north of Jericho
- Battle of Jericho, biblical story
- Cities in the Book of Joshua
- Hasmonean royal winter palaces, actually Hasmonean and Herodian, at Tulul Abu al-'Alayiq south of Jericho proper
- History of pottery in Palestine
- Jawa, Jordan, the oldest proto-urban settlement from Jordan (late 4th millennium BC – Early Bronze Age)
- Mevo'ot Yericho, Israeli settlement just north of Jericho
- Tower of Jericho, the Neolithic stone tower, c. 10,000 years old, excavated at Tell es-Sultan
- Wall of Jericho, the Neolithic stone wall, c. 10,000 years old, excavated at Tell es-Sultan

== Bibliography ==
- Ameling, Walter; Cotton, Hannah M.; Eck, Werner; Ecker, Avner (2018). "XLIX. Jericho nos. 2807-2845". Iudaea / Idumaea: 3325-3978. Corpus Inscriptionum Iudaeae/Palaestinae: A multi-lingual corpus of the inscriptions from Alexander to Muhammad. Vol. 4. De Gruyter. pp. 245–308. doi:10.1515/9783110544213-054. ISBN 978-3-11-054493-0.
- Barron, J.B., ed. (1923). Palestine: Report and General Abstracts of the Census of 1922. Government of Palestine.
- Benvenisti, M. (1998). City of Stone: The Hidden History of Jerusalem. University of California Press. ISBN 978-0-520-20768-4.
- Bromiley, G.W. (1995). The International Standard Bible Encyclopedia: E-J. Wm. B. Eerdmans Publishing. ISBN 978-0-8028-3782-0.
- Department of Statistics (1945). Village Statistics, April, 1945. Government of Palestine.
- Friling, T.; Cummings, Ora (2005). Arrows in the Dark: David Ben-Gurion, the Yishuv Leadership, and Rescue Attempts During the Holocaust. University of Wisconsin Press. ISBN 978-0-299-17550-4.
- Government of Jordan, Department of Statistics (1964). First Census of Population and Housing. Volume I: Final Tables; General Characteristics of the Population (PDF).
- Graham, Peter (1836). A topographical dictionary of Palestine. London.
- Hadawi, S. (1970). Village Statistics of 1945: A Classification of Land and Area ownership in Palestine. Palestine Liberation Organization Research Center.
- Hartmann, M. (1883). "Die Ortschaftenliste des Liwa Jerusalem in dem türkischen Staatskalender für Syrien auf das Jahr 1288 der Flucht (1871)". Zeitschrift des Deutschen Palästina-Vereins. 6: 102–149.
- Hull, E. (1855). Mount Seir, Sinai and Western Palestine. Richard Bently and Sons. ISBN 9781402189852.
- Hütteroth, W.-D.; Abdulfattah, K. (1977). Historical Geography of Palestine, Transjordan and Southern Syria in the Late 16th Century. Erlanger Geographische Arbeiten, Sonderband 5. Erlangen, Germany: Vorstand der Fränkischen Geographischen Gesellschaft. ISBN 3-920405-41-2.
- Jacobs, Paul F. (2000). "Jericho". In Freedman, David Noel; Myers, Allen C. (eds.). Eerdmans Dictionary of the Bible. Eerdmans. ISBN 9789053565032.
- Janson, H.W.; Janson, Anthony F. (2003). History of Art: The Western Tradition. Prentice Hall. ISBN 0-13-182895-9.
- Kuijt, Ian (2012). "Jericho". In Silberman, Neil Asher (ed.). The Oxford Companion to Archaeology. Vol. 2 (2 ed.). New York: Oxford University Press. ISBN 978-0-19-973578-5.
- Le Strange, G. (1890). Palestine Under the Moslems: A Description of Syria and the Holy Land from A.D. 650 to 1500. Committee of the Palestine Exploration Fund.
- Losch, Richard R. (2005). The Uttermost Part of the Earth: A Guide to Places in the Bible. Wm. B. Eerdmans Publishing. ISBN 978-0-8028-2805-7.
- Mills, E., ed. (1932). Census of Palestine 1931. Population of Villages, Towns and Administrative Areas. Jerusalem: Government of Palestine.
- Murphy-O'Connor, Jerome (1998). The Holy Land: An Oxford Archaeological Guide from Earliest Times to 1700. Oxford University Press. ISBN 978-0-19-288013-0.
- Nigro, Lorenzo (2020). "The Italian-Palestinian Expedition to Tell es-Sultan, Ancient Jericho (1997–2015)". In Sparks, Rachel T.; Finlayson, Bill; Wagemakers, Bart; SJ, Josef Mario Briffa (eds.). Digging Up Jericho: Past, Present and Future. Archaeopress Publishing Ltd. ISBN 978-1789693522.
- Ring, Trudy; Salkin, Robert M.; Berney, K. A.; Schellinger, Paul E. (1994). International Dictionary of Historic Places. Taylor & Francis. ISBN 978-1-884964-03-9.
- Robinson, E.; Smith, E. (1856). Biblical Researches in Palestine and adjacent regions: A Journal of Travels in the years 1838 and 1852, 2nd edition. Vol. 2. London: John Murray.
- Rogers, Guy MacLean (2022). For the Freedom of Zion: The Great Revolt of Jews against Romans, 66–74 CE. Yale University Press. ISBN 978-0-300-24813-5. Archived from the original on 7 December 2024.
- Schreiber, M.; Schiff, Alvin I.; Klenicki, Leon (2003). The Shengold Jewish Encyclopedia. Schreiber Pub. ISBN 978-1-887563-77-2.
- Shahin, Mariam (2005). Palestine: A Guide. Interlink Books. ISBN 978-1-56656-557-8.
- Singer, A. (2002). Constructing Ottoman Beneficence: An Imperial Soup Kitchen in Jerusalem. Albany: State University of New York Press. ISBN 0-7914-5352-9.
- Socin, A. (1879). "Alphabetisches Verzeichniss von Ortschaften des Paschalik Jerusalem". Zeitschrift des Deutschen Palästina-Vereins. 2: 135–163.
- Werlin, Steven H. (2015). "The Lower Jordan Valley: Na'aran and Jericho". Ancient Synagogues of Southern Palestine, 300-800 C.E. The Brill Reference Library of Judaism. Vol. 47. Brill. pp. 29–90. ISBN 978-90-04-29840-8.
