= Abulfeda =

Kurdish historian, geographer and statesman (1273–1331)

- Born: November 1273; Damascus, Mamluk Sultanate
- Died: 27 October 1331 (aged 57); Hama, Mamluk Sultanate
- Occupations: Geographer, Historian, Ayyubid prince, Local governor of Hama
- Children: Al-Afdal Muhammad

Philosophical work
- Notable works: Taqwim al-Buldan; Concise History of Humanity al-Tariq al-Rashad Ila Taerif al-Mamalik wal-Bilad

Ismāʿīl bin ʿAlī bin Maḥmūd bin Muḥammad bin ʿUmar bin Shāhanshāh bin Ayyūb bin Shādī bin Marwān (Arabic: إسماعيل بن علي بن محمود بن محمد بن عمر بن شاهنشاه بن أيوب بن شادي بن مروان), better known as Abū al-Fidāʾ or Abulfeda (Arabic: أبو الفداء; November 1273 – 27 October 1331), was a Mamluk-era Kurdish geographer, historian, Ayyubid prince and local governor of Hama.

== Life ==
Abu'l-Fida was born in Damascus, where his father al-Malik al-Afdal, brother of Emir Al-Mansur Muhammad II of Hama, had fled from the Mongols. Abu'l-Fida was an Ayyubid prince of Kurdish origin.

In his boyhood he devoted himself to the study of the Qur'an and the sciences, but from his twelfth year onward, he was almost constantly engaged in military expeditions, chiefly against the Crusaders.

In 1285 he was present at the attack on a stronghold of the Knights of St. John, and took part in the sieges of Tripoli, Acre and Qal'at ar-Rum. In 1298 he entered the service of the Mamluk sultan al-Malik al-Nasir and after twelve years was invested by him with the governorship of Hama. In 1312 he became prince with the title al-Malik al-Salih, and in 1320 received the hereditary rank of sultan with the title al-Malik al-Muʾayyad.

He died in 1331.

== Works ==
=== Geography ===
Taqwim al-Buldan ("Locating the Lands", written in 1321) is, like much of the history, founded on the works of his predecessors, including the works of Ptolemy and Muhammad al-Idrisi. A long introduction on various geographical matters is followed by twenty-eight sections dealing in tabular form with the chief towns of the world. After each name are given the longitude, latitude, climate, spelling, and then observations generally taken from earlier authors. Parts of the work were published and translated as early as 1650 in Europe. In his works Abu'l-Fida correctly mentions the latitude and longitude of the city of Quanzhou in China.

The book also contains the first known explanation of the circumnavigator's paradox. Abu'l-Fida wrote that a person who completed a westward circumnavigation of the world would count one fewer day than a stationary observer, since he was traveling in the same direction as the apparent motion of the sun in the sky. A person traveling eastward would count one more day than a stationary observer. This phenomenon was confirmed two centuries later, when the Magellan–Elcano expedition (1519–1522) completed the first circumnavigation. After sailing westward around the world from Spain, the expedition called at Cape Verde for supplies on Wednesday, 9 July 1522 (ship's time). However, the locals told them that it was actually Thursday, 10 July 1522.

=== History ===
His Concise History of Humanity (Arabic: المختصر في أخبار البشر Tarikh al-Mukhtasar fi Akhbar al-Bashar, also An Abridgment of the History at the Human Race, or History of Abu al-Fida تاريخ أبى الفداء) was written between 1315 and 1329 as a continuation of The Complete History by Ali ibn al-Athir (c. 1231). It is in the form of annals extending from the creation of the world to the year 1329.

It is divided into two parts, one covering the history of pre-Islamic Arabia and the other the history of Islam until 1329. It was kept up to date by other Arab historians, by Ibn al-Wardi until 1348, and by Ibn al-Shihna until 1403. It was translated into Latin, French and English and was the main work of Muslim historiography used by 18th-century orientalists including Jean Gagnier (1670–1740) and Johann Jakob Reiske (1754).

== See also ==
- List of Kurdish philosophers
- List of Muslim historians
- Abulfeda, a crater on the Moon which was named after him
