= Jericho International Stadium =

Stadium in Jericho, Palestine

- Interactive map of Jericho International Stadium
- Location: Jericho, Palestine
- Coordinates: 31°51′34″N 35°27′55″E
- Capacity: 15,000 (all seated)

Construction
- Opened: 1996
- Renovated: 2012

Tenant
- Hilal Areeha

Jericho International Stadium is an association football stadium in Jericho, Palestine. It is the home stadium of the Hilal Areeha of the West Bank Premier League. The stadium seats 15,000 spectators.
