= Hilal Areeha =

Palestinian football team

- Founded: 1974
- Ground: Jericho International Stadium
- Capacity: 15000
- League: West Bank First Division
- Website: http://www.kooora.com/?team=7416

Hilal Areeha (Arabic: هلال آريحا) is a Palestinian football team that played as part of the West Bank Premier League until 2012, when they were relegated to the West Bank First Division.

== History ==
Hilal Areeha was established in 1974 in Jericho.
