= Abraham Trommius =

Dutch theologian (b. 1633, d. 1719)

Abrahamus Trommius (August 23, 1633 — May 29, 1719), also known as Abraham Trom, was a Dutch pastor and Reformed theologian. He belonged to the Dutch Reformed Church. He is known for his concordance to the Bible, nicknamed De Trommius.

== Career ==
Trommius studied philosophy, literature, and theology at the University of Groningen. After completing his studies in Groningen, he made various study trips abroad; he ended up in various locations such as London, Geneva, Basel and Montauban. After his academic studies he started in 1658 at the ministry in Haren (within the province of Groningen). In 1671, he left Haren for the city of Groningen.

In addition to preaching, he also focused on writing a large number of theological works. The best known of these was his concordance to the 1637 States Translation, with which he immediately gained fame upon publishing. In 1662 he started with his father-in-law Johannes Martinus, with a start to this work in which the various Bible places are indicated per word in which the word in question appears.

After the death of his father-in-law in 1665, he continued this large-scale work alone. During the period 1672—1691 the complete concordance of both the Old and the New Testament saw the light. This standard work in three parts became a concept and appeared many times in reprint, up to the present.

In 1717 he received an honorary doctorate from the University of Groningen for it.

In addition to this concordance, he also made one for the Septuagint in 1717, the Concordantiae Graecae Versionis Vulgo Dictae LXX Interpretum

== Reception and responses ==
In 1718, the French orientalist John Gagnier wrote ‘Vindiciæ Kircherianæ, sive Animadversiones in novas Abrahami Trommii Concordantias Græcas versionis vulgo dictæ LXX. Interpretum,’ which was considered an unfair attack on Trommius, who was then an aged man.

In the 1750s, British North American theologian Jonathan Edwards consulted Trommius' concordance on the Septuagint in his "Blank Bible."
