= Ibn al-Shihna =

Syrian Hanafi scholar and historian (1348–1412)

Abu al-Walīd Ibn al-Shihna (Lisān ad-Dīn ʾAbū'l-Walīd Muḥammad ibn Kamāladdīn Muḥammad ibn aš-Šiḥna al-Halabī al-Ḥanafī, 1348–1412; AH 749–815) was a Mamluk-era Syrian Hanafi scholar and historian.

His Rawḍ al-manāẓir fī ʿilm al-awāʾil wa l-awāẖir ("Garden of the spectacles of the history of antiquity and modernity") details the talks he held with Timur as the representative of the scholars of Aleppo after Timur's conquest of Aleppo in 1400.

His son Muḥibb ad-Dīn ʾAbū al-Fadl Muḥammad Ibn aš-Šiḥna al-Halabī (1402–1485) was the chief judge of Aleppo for the Hanafi school of law.
