= Mordecai Schreiber =

American Reform rabbi and an author

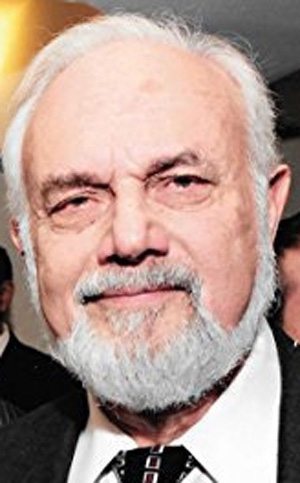
Mordecai Schreiber

Mordecai Schreiber is an American Reform rabbi and an author of about 60 books.

== Biography ==
Schreiber was born in Haifa, Israel in 1939. He saw the State of Israel being born and told about it in his memoir Land of Dreams, as well as in his recent book Three Founders of Israel: Ben-Gurion, Begin and Stern. He recently completed a new book project on Moses and leadership with an Episcopal and a Muslim scholars.

He has served as a rabbi in the United States and Guatemala. He has assisted the US government as an expert during trials of several former Nazis who settled in the USA. He is the founder of the Agnon School in Cleveland, Ohio, renamed the Mandel School.

He is married to Hanita Schreiber, former CEO of a United Health HMO in Washington, DC. His son Joel Schreiber is a financial planner in Montclair, NJ. His daughter Rachel Schreiber is the new executive dean of the Parsons School of Design in New York City. His younger daughter Marla Schulman is the president of Schreiber Translations in Rockville, MD, a major provider of technical translations to the U.S. Government which Schreiber founded in 1979.

== Bibliography ==
- How Millennials Can Lead Us out of the Mess We're In: A Jew, a Muslim and a Christian Share Leadership Lessons from the Life of Moses
- The Sage: Life's Key Questions
- Explaining the Holocaust : How and Why it Happened
- Land of Dreams: An Israeli Childhood
- Moon in the Pail (A Neo--Picaresque Tale
- The Shengold Jewish Encyclopedia
- Why People Pray: The Universal Power of Prayer
- Hearing the Voice of God: In Search of Prophecy
- The Rabbi and the Nun: A Love Story
- The Man Who Knew God: Decoding Jeremiah
- Begin: His Life and Legacy (With Hillel Seidman)
- Light to the Nations: World Peace from Biblical Promise to Human Action
- Three Founders of Israel
- Shabbat & Holiday Songster: A Companion for all Reform Services around the year

=== As Morry Sofer ===
- Ask the Bible: The Most Commonly Asked Questions about the Old Testament
- Light to the Nations: World Peace from Biblical Promise to Human Action
- The Global Translator's Handbook

=== Translated from Hebrew ===
- Sparks of Glory
- Wanted
- Light in the Darkness
- Glimmers of Light in a Betraying Land

Also: technical books for translators
