= Fall of Jericho =

Legendary battle fought by the Israelites during their conquest of Canaan

- Part of the Conquest of Canaan
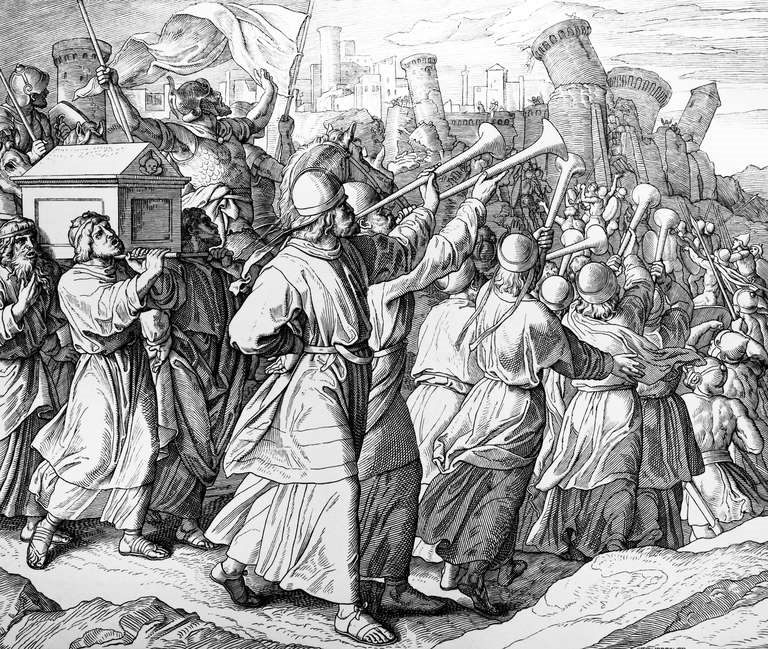
- Depiction by Julius Schnoor von Carolsfeld (1794–1872)
Location	Tell es-Sultan (biblical Jericho) 31°52′16″N 35°26′38″E
Result	Israelite victory

Belligerents
Israelites	Canaanites

Commanders and leaders
Joshua	King of Jericho †

Strength
40,000	Unknown

Casualties and losses
None	Massacre of all inhabitants (excluding Rahab and her family).
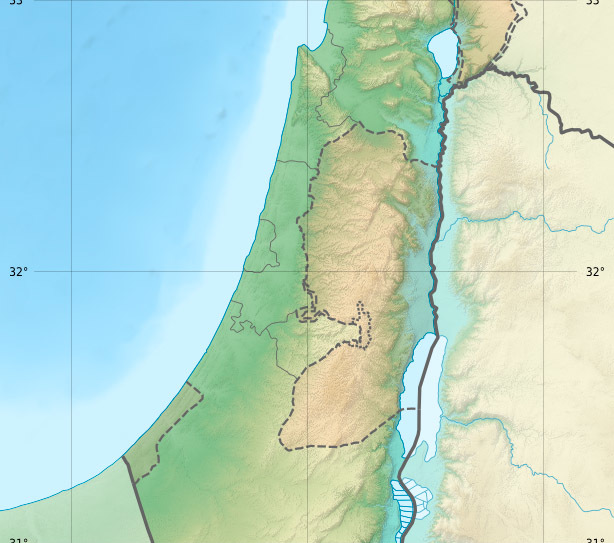
- Location within West Bank Fall of Jericho (Israel)

The fall of Jericho, as described in the Book of Joshua, was the first military engagement fought by the Israelites in the course of the conquest of Canaan. According to Joshua 6:1–27, the walls of Jericho fell after the Israelites marched around the city walls once a day for six days, seven times on the seventh day, with the priests blowing their horns daily and the people shouting on the last day. Excavations at Tell es-Sultan, the biblical Jericho, have found evidence of a city at the relevant time (end of the Bronze Age), but there is a consensus among scholars that the story has its origins in the revanchist political goals of much later kings of Judah and their claims to the territory of the Kingdom of Israel.

== Biblical account ==
According to the Book of Joshua, when the Israelites were encamped at Shittim opposite Jericho, ready to cross the river, Joshua, as a final preparation, sent out two spies to Jericho. The spies stayed in the house of Rahab, a local prostitute. The king of Jericho sent soldiers to Rahab's house and demanded she bring out the spies. Instead, she hid them under bundles of flax on the roof. After escaping, the spies promised to spare Rahab and her family after taking the city, if she would mark her house by hanging a red cord out the window.

After the Israelites crossed the Jordan, the king of Jericho ordered that the gates of the walls be closed. God commanded Joshua to go around the walls of Jericho for six days, once every day, and seven times on the seventh day. God commanded the city to be attacked by seven priests blowing horns, with the Ark of the Covenant in front of them and all the people behind the Ark of the Covenant. They encircled the wall of Jericho once a day for the first six days, and then encircled the city seven times on the seventh day. After the shofar (horn) sounded a great blow, the Israelites shouted, and the city walls fell beneath them.

Following God's law, the Israelites killed every man and woman, the young and the old, as well as the oxen, sheep, and donkeys. Only Rahab, her parents, brothers and all "those who belonged to her" were spared. They were incorporated into Israel. Joshua then cursed anybody who rebuilt the foundations and gates, with the deaths of their firstborn and youngest child respectively. This was eventually fulfilled by Hiel the Bethelite under King Ahab's reign.

== Origins and historicity ==
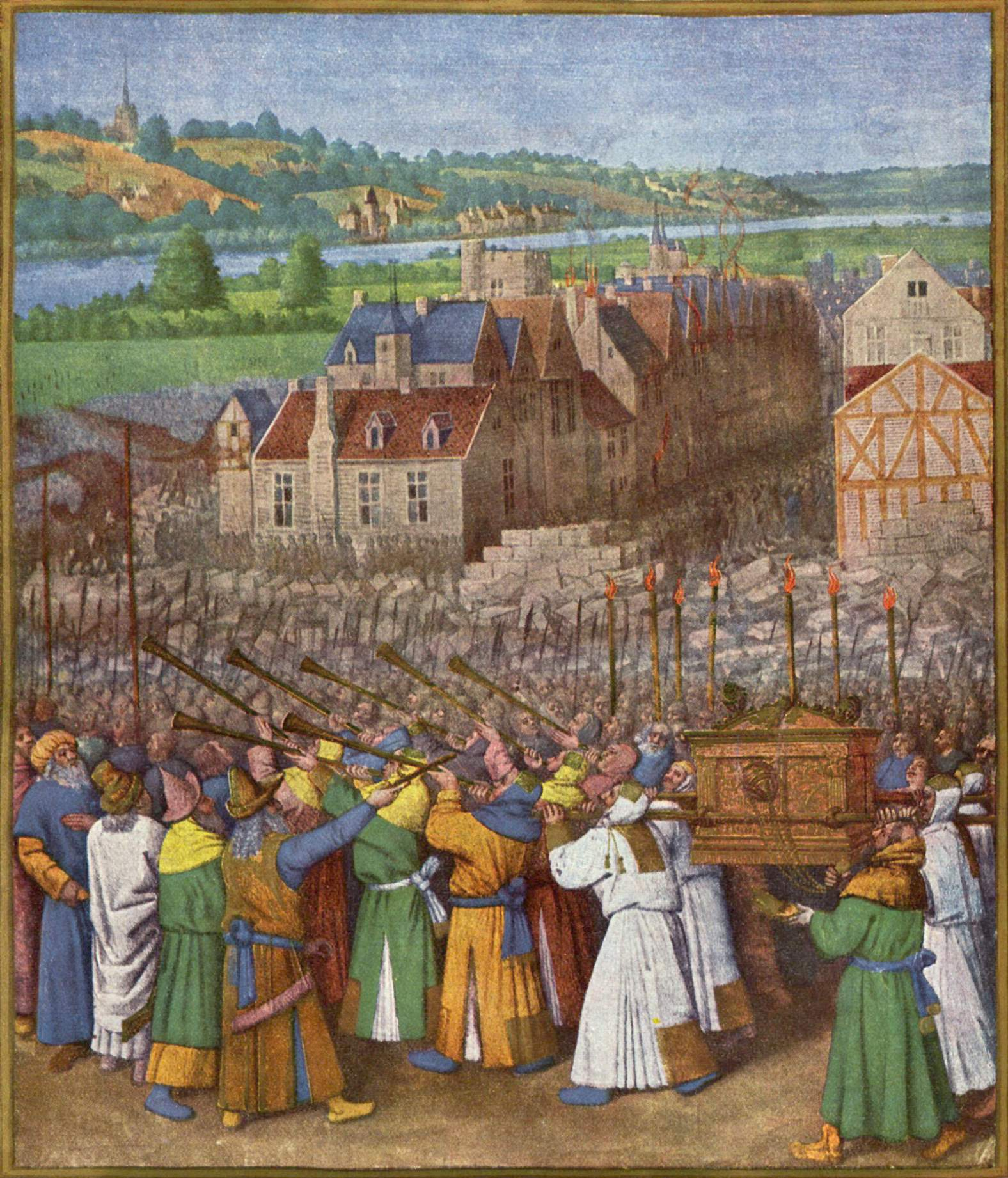
Depiction of the battle by Jean Fouquet (c. 1415–1420)

=== Excavations at Tell es-Sultan ===
In 1868, Charles Warren identified Tell es-Sultan as the site of biblical Jericho. Ernst Sellin and Carl Watzinger excavated the site between 1907 and 1909 and in 1911, finding the remains of two walls which they initially suggested supported the biblical account of the Battle of Jericho. They later revised this conclusion and dated their finds to the Middle Bronze Age (1950–1550 BCE). In 1930–1936, John Garstang conducted excavations there and discovered the remains of a network of collapsed walls which he dated to about 1400 BCE. Kathleen Kenyon re-excavated the site over 1952–1958 and demonstrated that the destruction occurred at an earlier time, during a well-attested Egyptian campaign against the Hyksos of that period, and that Jericho had been deserted throughout the mid-late 13th century BCE, the supposed time of Joshua's battle. Sources differ as to what date Kenyon instead proposed; either c. 1500 BCE or c. 1580 BCE. Kenyon's work was corroborated in 1995 by radiocarbon tests which dated the destruction level to the late 17th or 16th centuries BCE. Although this destruction is dated to 16th century BCE by carbon dating, scholars propose that this destruction could be ascribed to either Ahmose I(1549-1524 BCE), whose royal signet was found in the necropolis in a slightly later LB I tomb, or Tuthmose III(1479-1425 BCE), whose scarab was recovered from a cemetery northwest of Jericho. A small unwalled settlement was rebuilt after the destruction, but it has been agreed that the tell was unoccupied until the 10th/9th centuries BCE.

More recently, Lorenzo Nigro from the Italian-Palestinian Expedition to Tell es-Sultan has argued that there was some sort of settlement at the site during the 14th and 13th centuries BCE. He states that the expedition has detected Late Bronze II layers in several parts of the tell, although its top layers were heavily cut by levelling operations during the Iron Age, which explains the scarcity of 13th century materials. Nigro says that the idea that the Biblical account should have a literal archaeological correspondence is erroneous, and "any attempt to seriously identify something on the ground with biblical personages and their acts" is hazardous.

In 2023, Nigro confirmed that Jericho was occupied in the Late Bronze Age (1400–1200 BCE). During this period, the previous Middle Bronze city wall was refurbished by adding a mudbrick wall on top of its emerging crest. The city also had a structure known as the "Middle Building" which apparently served as the residence of its local rulers, then vassals of the Egyptian empire. There also appears to be evidence that the Middle Building was eventually destroyed, only being reused later in the early Iron Age.

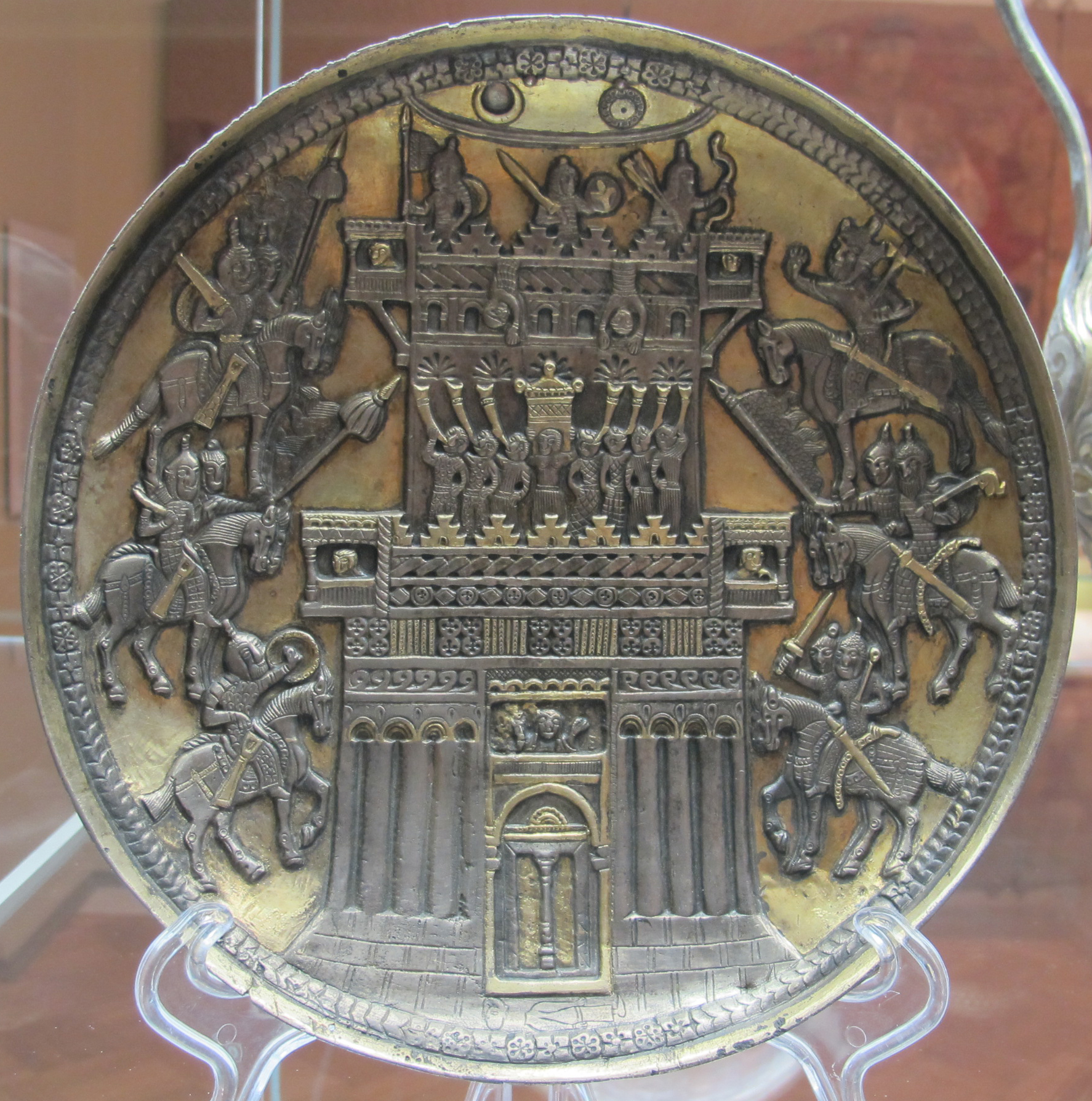
The Siege of Jericho, in a Nestorian Christian plate made by Sogdian artists under Karluk dominion, in Semirechye. Cast silver of the 9th-10th century, copied from an original 8th century plate.

=== Academic consensus ===
A minority of scholars maintain that the biblical account is historical and that an Israelite conquest of Jericho may have occurred around the 13th century BCE, but the strong consensus among scholars is that the Book of Joshua holds little historical value. Its origin lies in a time far removed from the times that it depicts, and its intention is primarily theological in detailing how Israel and her leaders are judged by their obedience to the teachings and laws (the covenant) set down in the Book of Deuteronomy. The story of Jericho and the rest of the conquest represents the nationalist propaganda of the Kingdom of Judah and their claims to the territory of the Kingdom of Israel after 722 BCE; and that those chapters were later incorporated into an early form of Joshua likely written late in the reign of King Josiah (reigned 640–609 BCE), and the book was revised and completed after the fall of Jerusalem to the Babylonians in 586 BCE, and possibly after the return from the Babylonian exile in 538 BCE.

According to Ann E. Killebrew, "Most scholars today accept that the majority of the conquest narratives in the book of Joshua are devoid of historical reality".

On point 3, there was no statistically significant military conquest of Canaan in the thirteenth–twelfth centuries BCE. The evidence is overwhelmingly in support of various “indigenous origins” models, emphasizing “long-term” social and cultural evolution from “Canaanite” to “Israelite” ethnicity. No mainstream biblicist or archaeologist any longer espouses the conquest model.

— William G. Dever (2023)

== See also ==
- Ai (Bible)
- Biblical archaeology
- "Joshua Fit the Battle of Jericho", African-American spiritual about the battle
