= Tell es-Sultan =

Archaeological site in Jericho

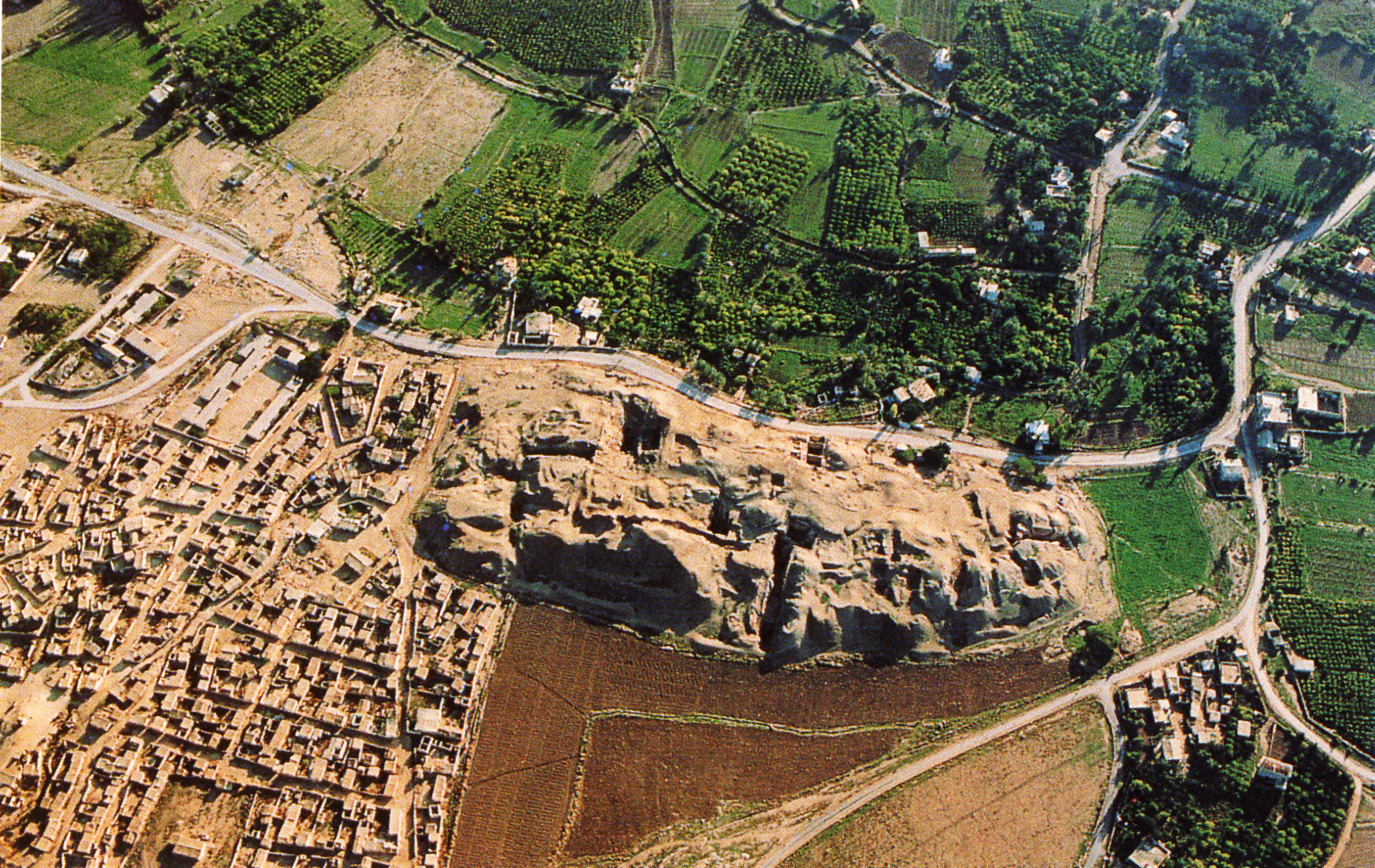
- Tell es-Sultan

- Location within State of Palestine
- 31°52′16″N 35°26′38″E
- Type: Settlement
- Cultures: Natufian (Epipalaeolithic), Lodian (Pottery Neolithic), Canaanite (Bronze Age)
- Location: Jericho, West Bank; Palestine
- Region: Levant

History
- Built: c. 10,000 BCE
- Abandoned: c. 900 BCE

UNESCO World Heritage Site
- Official name: Ancient Jericho/Tell es-Sultan
- Type: Cultural
- Criteria: iii, iv
- Designated: 2023
- Reference no.: 1687
- Region: Asia-Pacific

Tell es-Sultan (Arabic: تل السلطان, lit. Sultan's Hill), also known as Tel Jericho or Ancient Jericho, is an archaeological site and a UNESCO World Heritage Site (since 2023) in Palestine, in the city of Jericho, consisting of the remains of the oldest fortified city in the world. The site is managed as a National Archaeological Park by the Palestinian Ministry of Tourism and Antiquities/Department of Antiquities and Cultural Heritage (MoTA–DACH), which oversees on-site conservation in continued partnership with the Sapienza University of Rome archaeological expedition.

It is located adjacent to the Ein es-Sultan refugee camp, 2 km (1.2 mi) north of the centre of the Palestinian city of Jericho. The tell was inhabited from the 10th millennium BCE, which makes Jericho among the oldest continually inhabited cities in the world. The site is notable for its role in the history of Levantine archaeology.

The area was first identified as the site of ancient Jericho in modern times by Charles Warren in 1868, on the basis of its proximity to the large spring of Ein es-Sultan, that had been proposed as the spring of Elisha by Edward Robinson three decades earlier.

== History and archaeology ==
=== Epipalaeolithic ===
The droughts and cold of the Younger Dryas came to an end around 9600 BCE, ushering in the Holocene epoch and the Epipaleolithic period of human history. The resulting warmer climate made it possible for Natufian groups to extend the duration of their stay, eventually leading to year-round habitation and permanent settlement. The first permanent settlement at Tell es-Sultan—marked by the construction of Natufian structures—developed between 10,000 and 9000 BCE, which appears to predate the invention of agriculture. Tell es-Sultan was a popular camping ground for Natufian hunter-gatherer groups due to the nearby Ein as-Sultan spring; these hunter-gatherers left a scattering of crescent-shaped microlith tools behind.

=== Pre-Pottery Neolithic A (PPNA) ===
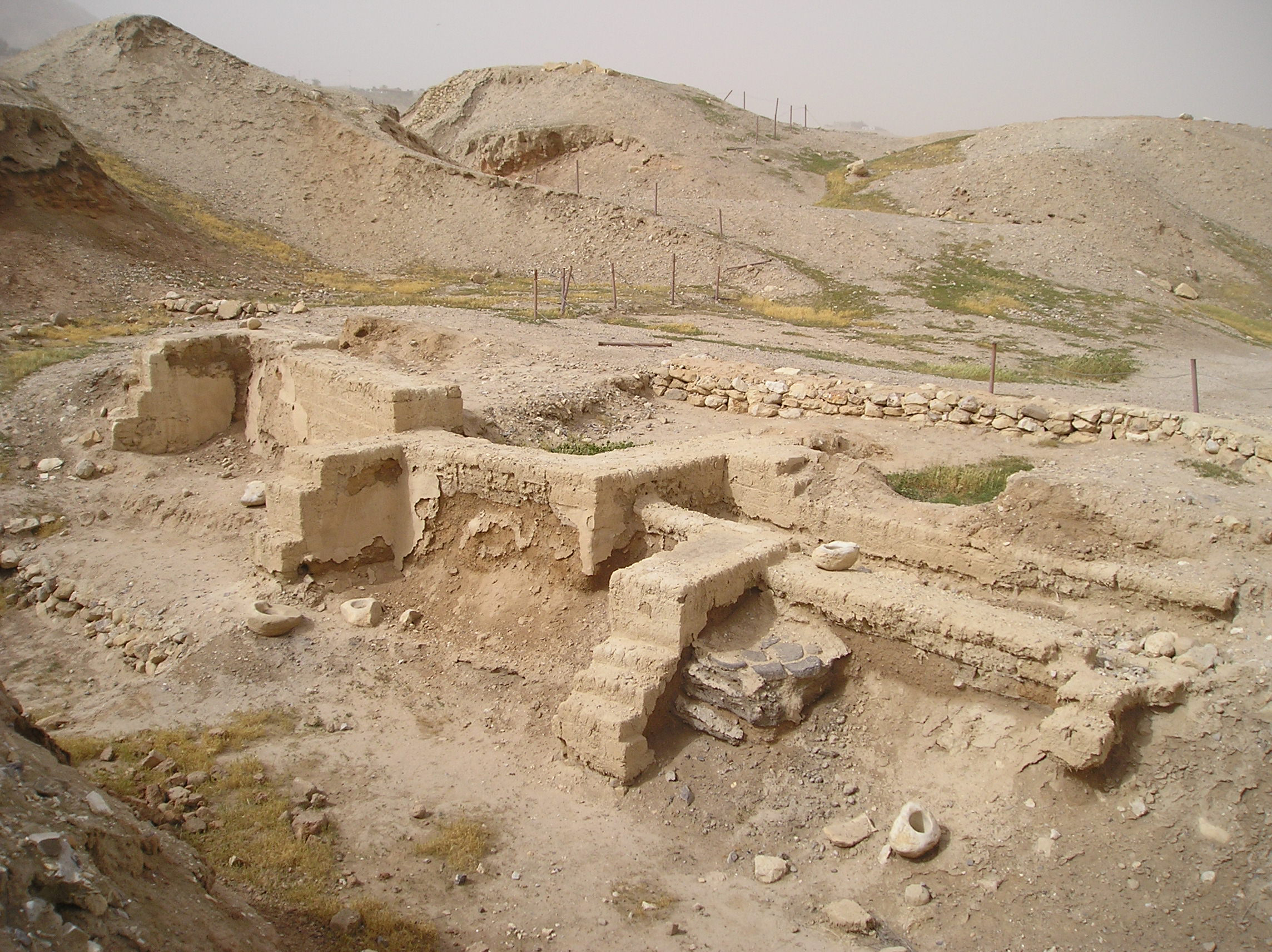
Dwelling foundations unearthed at Tell es-Sultan in Jericho

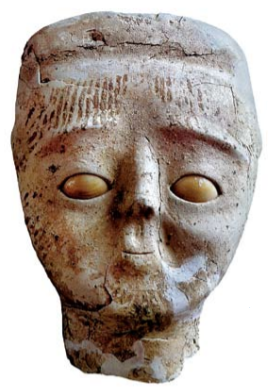
Ancestor statue, Jericho, from c. 9000 years ago. Rockefeller Archeological Museum, Jerusalem.

The Pre-Pottery Neolithic A phase at Tell es-Sultan (c. 8500–7500 BCE) saw the emergence of one of the world's first major proto-cities. As the world warmed up, a new culture based on agriculture and sedentary dwelling emerged, which archaeologists have termed "Pre-Pottery Neolithic A" (abbreviated as PPNA), sometimes called the Sultanian era after the town. PPNA villages are characterized by small circular dwellings, burial of the dead under the floor of buildings, reliance on hunting wild game, the cultivation of wild or domestic cereals, and no use of pottery yet.

The PPNA-era town, a settlement of around 4 hectares (9.9 acres), contained round mud-brick houses, yet no street planning. Circular dwellings were built of clay and straw bricks left to dry in the sun, which were plastered together with a mud mortar. Each house measured about 5 metres (16 ft) across, and was roofed with mud-smeared brush. Hearths were located within and outside the homes.

The identity and number of the inhabitants of Jericho during the PPNA period is still under debate, with estimates going as high as 2,000–3,000, and as low as 200–300. It is known that this population had cultivated emmer wheat, barley and pulses and hunted wild animals.

The town was surrounded by a massive stone wall over 3.6 metres (12 ft) high and 1.8 metres (6 ft) wide at the base, inside of which stood a stone tower, placed in the centre of the west side of the tell. This tower was the tallest structure in the world until the Pyramid of Djoser, and the second-oldest tower after the one at Tell Qaramel. The wall and tower were built around 8000 BCE. Radiocarbon dating indicates that the tower was built around 8300 BCE and stayed in use until c. 7800 BCE. The wall and tower would have taken a hundred men more than a hundred days to construct, thus suggesting some kind of social organization and division of labour.

The major structures help understand Sultanian settlements in the southern Levant.

=== Pre-Pottery Neolithic B (PPNB) ===
After a few centuries, the first settlement was abandoned. After the PPNA settlement phase, there was a settlement hiatus of several centuries, then the Pre-Pottery Neolithic B settlement was founded on the eroded surface of the tell. This second settlement, established in 6800 BCE, perhaps represents the work of an invading people who absorbed the original inhabitants into their dominant culture. Artifacts dating from this period include ten plastered human skulls, painted so as to reconstitute the individuals' features. These represent either teraphim or an early example of portraiture in art history, and it is thought that they were kept in people's homes while the bodies were buried.

The architecture consisted of rectilinear buildings made of mudbricks on stone foundations. The mudbricks were loaf-shaped with deep thumbprints to facilitate bonding. No building has been excavated in its entirety. Normally, several rooms cluster around a central courtyard. There is one big room (6.5 m × 4 m (21 ft × 13 ft)) and a second slightly smaller room (7 m × 3 m (23 ft × 10 ft)) containing internal divisions. The remaining areas are small, and presumably used for storage. The rooms have red or pinkish terrazzo-floors made of lime. Some impressions of mats made of reeds or rushes have been preserved. The courtyards have clay floors.

Kathleen Kenyon interpreted one building as a shrine. It contained a niche in the wall. A chipped pillar of volcanic stone that was found nearby might have fit into this niche.

The dead were buried under the floors or in the rubble fill of abandoned buildings. There are several collective burials. Not all the skeletons are completely articulated, which may point to a time of exposure before burial. A skull cache contained seven human skulls. The jaws were removed and the faces covered with plaster; cowries were used as eyes. A total of ten skulls were found. Modeled skulls were found in Tell Ramad and Beisamoun as well.

Other finds included capsule fragments of flax (Linum usitatissimum) as evidence for early plant domestication at Jericho. These remains represent some of the earliest morphological indicators of cultivating non-shattering flax for oil and fiber in the Southern Levant. Flints, such as arrowheads (tanged or side-notched), finely denticulated sickle-blades, burins, scrapers, a few tranchet axes, obsidian, and green obsidian from an unknown source. There were also querns, hammerstones, and a few ground-stone axes made of greenstone. Other items discovered included dishes and bowls carved from soft limestone, spindle whorls made of stone and possible loom weights, spatulae and drills, stylised anthropomorphic plaster figures, almost life-size, anthropomorphic and theriomorphic clay figurines, as well as shell and malachite beads.

=== Bronze Age ===
A succession of settlements followed from 4500 BCE onward, the largest constructed in the Early Bronze Age, around 2600 BCE. Tell es-Sultan has been occupied, destroyed, and abandoned many times, as evidenced by its many destruction layers.

The site appears to have been continuously occupied from the Early Bronze Age into the early part of the Middle Bronze Age. Radiocarbon dating suggests the city was destroyed and abandoned around 2000/1950 BCE. The city was subsequently reconstructed, reaching its greatest extent in the period from 1700 to 1550 BCE. At that time, it was a small but important city of the Canaan region which reflected the greater urbanization in the area. The city has been linked to the rise of the Maryannu, a class of chariot-using aristocrats linked to the rise of the Mitannite state to the north. It was surrounded by extensive defensive walls strengthened with rectangular towers, and possessed an extensive cemetery with vertical shaft-tombs and underground burial chambers; the elaborate funeral offerings in some of these may reflect the emergence of local kings. Kathleen Kenyon reported "the Middle Bronze Age is perhaps the most prosperous in the whole history of Kna'an. ... The defenses ... belong to a fairly advanced date in that period" and there was "a massive stone revetment; ... part of a complex system" of defenses (pp. 213–218).

The city was destroyed again in the 16th century at the end of the Middle Bronze Age. The calibrated carbon remains from its City-IV destruction layer date to 1617–1530 BCE. Although this destruction is dated to 16th century by carbon dating, scholars propose that this destruction could be ascribed to either Ahmose I (1549–1524 BCE), whose royal signet was found in the necropolis in a slightly later LB I tomb, or Tuthmose III (1479–1425 BCE), whose scarab was recovered from a cemetery northwest of Jericho. Following this destruction, the town was reoccupied again during the Late Bronze Age (1550–1200 BC), with the previous Middle Bronze city wall being refurbished by adding a mudbrick wall on top of its surviving crest. According to Lorenzo Nigro, the top Late Bronze IIB layers of the tell were heavily cut by levelling operations during the Iron Age, which explains the scarcity of 13th century materials.

=== Iron Age ===
Occupation in Tell es-Sultan appears to have resumed in the 11th century BCE, with the town becoming fortified again in the 10th century. Of this new city not much more remains than a four-room house on the eastern slope. By the 7th century Jericho had become an extensive town, but this settlement was destroyed in the Babylonian conquest of Judah in the early 6th century.

=== Abandonment of the tell ===
In response to Judah's revolts against Babylon, Jericho was destroyed by the Babylonians in 587/586 BCE. The city was rebuilt during the Persian period after the Jews were freed from the Babylonian captivity. There are very few remains from this period, and the site was abandoned as a place of settlement not long after this period.

== Archaeological excavation ==
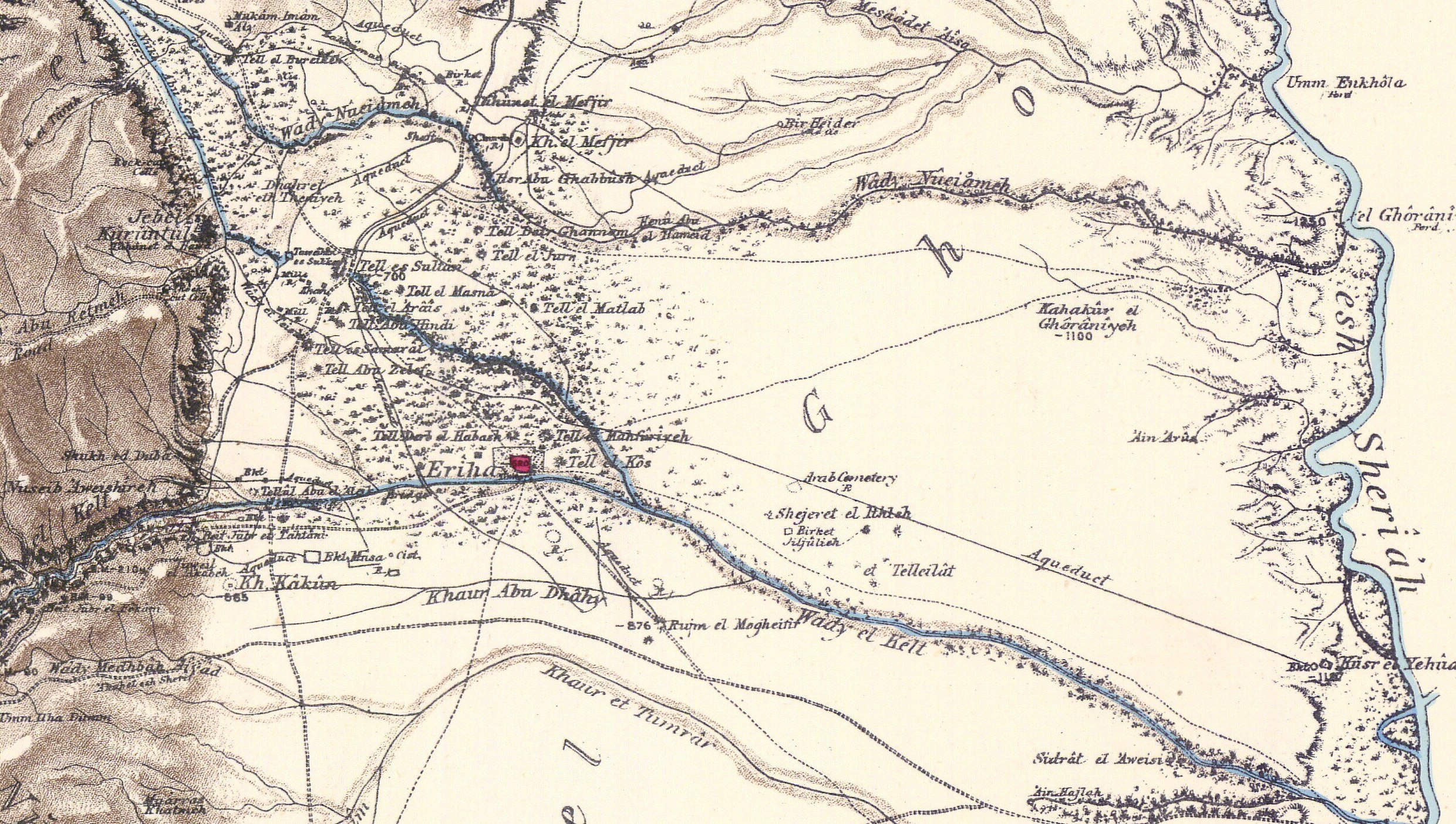
The area around Tell es-Sultan in the PEF Survey of Palestine, drawn a few years after Warren's expedition

The first excavations of the tells around Ain es-Sultan (Arabic: عين سلطان, lit. 'Sultan's spring') were made by Charles Warren in 1868 on behalf of the Palestine Exploration Fund. Warren excavated nine mounds in the area of the spring; during one of the excavations his workmen dug through the mud bricks of the wall without realizing what it was.

The spring had been identified in 1838 in Edward Robinson's Biblical Researches in Palestine as "the scene of Elisha's miracle", on the basis of it being the primary spring near to Jericho. On this basis Warren proposed the surrounding mounds as the site of Ancient Jericho, but he did not have the funds to carry out a full excavation. Believing that it was the spring where Elisha healed, he suggested shifting the entire mound for evidence, which he thought could be done for £400 (equivalent to £40,000 in 2025).

Ernst Sellin and Carl Watzinger excavated Tell es-Sultan and Tulul Abu el-'Alayiq between 1907 and 1909 and in 1911, finding the remains of two walls which they initially suggested supported the biblical account of the Battle of Jericho. They later revised this conclusion and dated their finds to the Middle Bronze Age (1950–1550 BCE).

The site was again excavated by John Garstang between 1930 and 1936, who again raised the suggestion that remains of the upper wall was that described in the Bible, and dated to around 1400 BCE.

Extensive investigations using more modern techniques were made by Kathleen Kenyon between 1952 and 1958. Her excavations discovered a tower and wall in trench I. Kenyon provided evidence that both constructions dated much earlier than previous estimates of the site's age, to the Neolithic, and were part of an early proto-city. Her excavations found a series of seventeen early Bronze Age walls, some of which she thought may have been destroyed by earthquakes. The last of the walls was put together in a hurry, indicating that the settlement had been destroyed by nomadic invaders. Another wall was built by a more sophisticated culture in the Middle Bronze Age with a steep plastered escarpment leading up to mud bricks on top.

Lorenzo Nigro and Nicolo Marchetti conducted excavations in 1997–2000. Since 2009 the Italian-Palestinian archaeological project of excavation and restoration was resumed by Rome "La Sapienza" University and Palestinian MOTA-DACH under the direction of Lorenzo Nigro and Hamdan Taha.

Renewed excavations were carried out at Tell es-Sultan from 2009 to 2023 by the Italian-Palestinian Expedition directed by Lorenzo Nigro for Sapienza University of Rome and Jehad Yasine for the Ministry of Tourism & Antiquities of Palestine. These works uncovered several monuments of the Bronze Age City: the Palaces on the Spring Hill (Early Bronze II–III, 3000–2350 BCE; MB I–II, called "Palace of the Shepherds Kings" and the MB III palace, called "Hyksos' Palace"), the south-east Gate, called Jerusalem Gate, and several traits of the ancient city walls.

== Walls ==
The PPNA-era city wall was designed for either defensive or flood protection purposes; the mass of the wall (approximately 1.5 to 2 metres (4.9 to 6.6 ft) thick and 3.7 to 5.2 metres (12 to 17 ft) high) as well as that of the tower suggests a defensive purpose as well. It is suggested to date to approximately 8000 BCE. If interpreted as an "urban fortification", the Wall of Jericho is the oldest city wall discovered by archaeologists anywhere in the world. Surrounding the wall was a ditch 8.2 metres (27 ft) wide by 2.7 metres (9 ft) deep, cut through solid bedrock with a circumference around the town of as much as 600 metres (2,000 ft). Kenyon commented that the "labour involved in excavating this ditch out of solid rock must have been tremendous."

Phases of wall construction
Phase I: A 3.6 m high stone perimeter wall was constructed, abutting the outer face of the tower. The two human figures on the left show the approximate scale.

Phase II: An additional wall and outer ditch were added. The space between the two walls was filled with debris from the ditch. A 'skin wall' was built to reinforce the tower, incorporating part of the first wall.

Phase III: As the ditch silted up, a new wall was built on top of the remains of the two earlier ones. At the same time, the lower entrance to the tower was blocked.
After Bar-Yosef (1986) and Kenyon (1981)

== Tower of Jericho ==
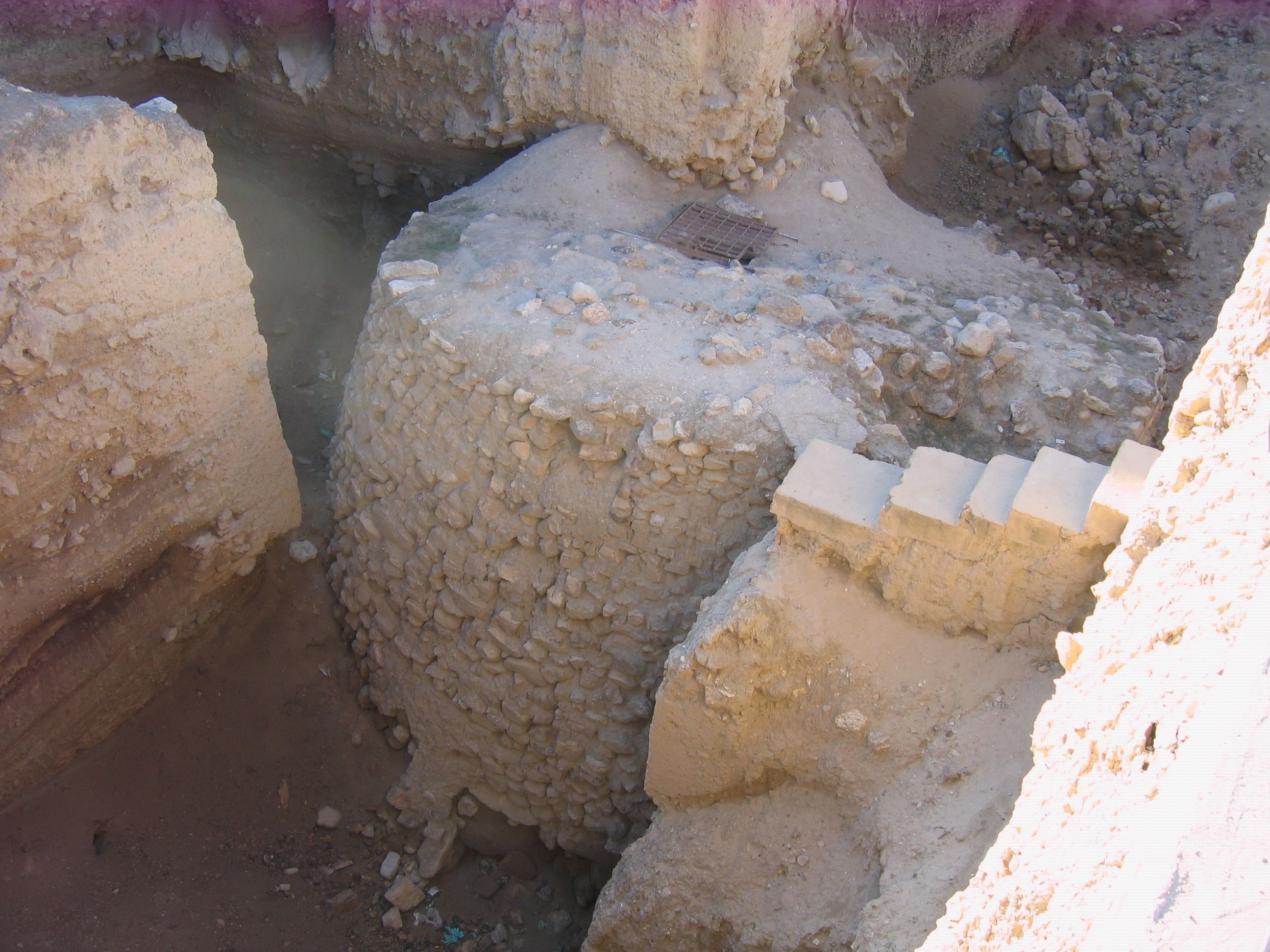
Tower of Jericho

The Tower of Jericho is an 8.5-metre-tall (28 ft) stone structure, built in the Pre-Pottery Neolithic A period around 8000 BCE. It is among the earliest stone monuments of mankind. Conical in shape, the tower is almost 9 metres (30 ft) in diameter at the base, decreasing to 7 metres (23 ft) at the top, with walls approximately 1.5 metres (5 ft) thick. It contains an internal staircase with 22 stone steps.

== Current-day management ==
In 2023, Tell es-Sultan (ancient Jericho) was inscribed on the UNESCO World Heritage List under the name "Tell es-Sultan/Ancient Jericho: A Testimony to Human Civilizations for 11,000 Years," recognized for its continuous sequence of settlement layers spanning the Neolithic period. The site is managed as a National Archaeological Park by the Palestinian Ministry of Tourism and Antiquities/Department of Antiquities and Cultural Heritage (MoTA–DACH), which oversees on-site conservation in continued partnership with the Sapienza University of Rome archaeological expedition. UNESCO has identified the absence of a systematic, holistic conservation strategy as a key management challenge, and a multi-year project launched in 2022 aims to stabilize exposed archaeological remains, mitigate erosion, and strengthen local heritage-management capacity. The site's inscription itself was contested by members of the Israeli government, who argued the location should fall under Israeli rather than Palestinian jurisdiction, though the World Heritage Committee's decision affirmed that Tell es-Sultan lies fully within Palestinian Authority-administered Area A. Ongoing site management involves conservation partnerships aimed at protecting the exposed tell from erosion while maintaining public access.

== Bibliography ==
- Jacobs, Paul F. (2000). "Jericho". In Freedman, David Noel; Myers, Allen C.; Beck, Astrid B. (eds.). Eerdmans Dictionary of the Bible. Grand Rapids, Michigan: William B. Eerdmans Publishing Company. ISBN 0-8028-2400-5.
- Kuijt, Ian (2012). "Jericho". In Silberman, Neil Asher (ed.). The Oxford Companion to Archaeology. Vol. 2 (2 ed.). New York: Oxford University Press. ISBN 978-0-19-973578-5.
- Mithen, Steven (2006). After the ice: a global human history, 20,000-5000 BCE. Cambridge, Massachusetts: Harvard University Press. ISBN 0-674-01999-7.
- Nigro, Lorenzo (2020). "The Italian-Palestinian Expedition to Tell es-Sultan, Ancient Jericho (1997–2015)". In Sparks, Rachel T.; Finlayson, Bill; Wagemakers, Bart; SJ, Josef Mario Briffa (eds.). Digging Up Jericho: Past, Present and Future. Archaeopress Publishing Ltd. ISBN 978-1789693522.
