= List of oldest extant buildings =

This is a list of oldest extant buildings.

== Criteria ==
A building is defined as any human-made structure used or interface for supporting or sheltering any use or continuous occupancy. In order to qualify for this list, a structure must:

- be a recognisable building;
- incorporate features of building work from the claimed date to at least 1.5 metres (4.9 ft) in height;
- be largely complete or include building work to this height for most of its perimeter.
- contain an enclosed area with at least one entry point.

This deliberately excludes ruins of limited height and statues. The list also excludes:

- dolmens, a type of single-chamber megalithic tomb, usually consisting of three or more upright stones supporting a large flat horizontal capstone. Dolmens were typically covered with earth or smaller stones to form a tumulus (which are included in the list). In many instances, that covering has weathered away, leaving only the stone "skeleton" of the burial mound intact. Neolithic dolmens are extremely numerous, with over 1,000 reported from Mecklenburg-Vorpommern in Germany alone.
- cairns, which are simply large piles of loose stones (as opposed to chambered cairns)
- standing stone rings, such as Stonehenge, also do not count because they are not enclosed and do not have roofs.

Dates for many of the oldest structures have been arrived at by radiocarbon dating and should be considered approximate.

== By age ==
The following are amongst the oldest buildings in the world that have maintained the requirements to be such. Occupation sites with older human made structures, such as those in Göbekli Tepe do exist, but the structures are monuments and do not meet the definition of building (which can be seen above). Many of the buildings within the list contain primarily bricks, but most importantly maintain their walls and roofs. There are numerous extant structures that survive in the Orkney islands of Scotland, some of the best known of which are part of the Heart of Neolithic Orkney World Heritage Site. The list also contains many large buildings from the Egyptian Age of the Pyramids.

Building	Image	Country	Continent	First built	Use	Note
Tell Qaramel (Tel Al-Qaramel)		Syria	Asia	c. 10,650 – c. 9650 BCE	Tower	Located in Aleppo Governorate, five stone towers were found at Tell Qaramel; dated to the period from the middle of the 11th millennium BCE to about 9650 BCE, making them the oldest structures of this type in the world.
Karahan Tepe		Turkey	Asia	c. 10,000 – c. 9500 BCE	Settlement	Located in southern Turkey. Part of a region of similar sites now being uncovered known as the Taş Tepeler.
Göbekli Tepe		Turkey	Asia	c. 9500 – c. 8000 BCE	Place of worship	Southern Turkey. The tell includes two phases of use, believed to be of a social or ritual nature by site discoverer and excavator Klaus Schmidt, dating back to the 10th–8th millennium BCE. The structure is 300 m in diameter and 15 m high.
Jerf el Ahmar		Syria	Asia	c. 9500 – c. 8700 BCE	Settlement	Located in northern Syria, Jerf el Ahmar is particularly notable for its communal buildings, a number of which attest to complex community organization and suggest connections between architecture design and rituals or cult practices.
The rectangular buildings of Mureybet		Syria	Asia	c. 9000 BCE	Settlement	Located in Raqqa Governorate, northern Syria, Mureybet was first settled in 10,200 BCE. As the settlement evolved, rectangular structures composed of several rooms began to emerge at the end of the 10th millennium BCE.
Tower of Jericho		West Bank, Palestine	Asia	c. 8000 BCE	Tower	An 8.5-metre-tall (28-foot) stone structure, constructed of undressed stones, with an internal staircase of twenty-two steps
Çatalhöyük		Turkey	Asia	c. 7500 – c. 5700 BCE	Settlement	A very large Neolithic and Chalcolithic proto-city settlement in southern Anatolia
Sesklo		Greece	Europe	c. 5800 BCE	Settlement	A Neolithic archaeological site with remains of stone buildings and stone foundations situated in the region of Thessaly in Greece.
Mehrgarh		Pakistan	Asia	c. 5200 BCE	Settlement	A Neolithic archaeological site situated on the Kacchi Plain of Balochistan in Pakistan. It is located near the Bolan Pass, to the west of the Indus River and between the modern-day Pakistani cities of Quetta, Kalat and Sibi.
Barnenez		France	Europe	c. 4850 BCE	Passage grave	Located in northern Finistère and partially restored. According to André Malraux it would have been better named 'The Prehistoric Parthenon'. The structure is 72 m (236 ft) long, 25 m (82 ft) wide and over 8 m (26 ft) high.
Dimini		Greece	Europe	c. 4800 BCE	Settlement	A Neolithic archaeological site with remains of stone buildings and stone foundations situated in the region of Thessaly in Greece.
Tumulus of Bougon	Barnenez	France	Europe	c. 4800 BCE	Tumulus	A necropolis, complex of tombs with varying dates in Deux-Sèvres near Niort and Poitiers, the oldest being E and F0.
Solnitsata		Bulgaria	Europe	c. 4700 BCE	Settlement	A Chalcolithic archaeological site with remains of stone walls situated in Bulgaria, associated with the Varna culture.
Kercado tumulus		France	Europe	c. 4700 BCE	Tomb	A megalithic passage tomb located in Carnac, Brittany, France.
Saint-Michel tumulus	Barnenez	France	Europe	c. 4500 BCE	Tumulus	The tumulus forms what is almost an artificial hillock of more than 30,000 m^{3} (1,100,000 cu ft) (60 m × 125 m × 10 m (197 ft × 410 ft × 33 ft)).
Gavrinis passage tomb		France	Europe	c. 4200-4000 BCE	Tomb	On a small island, situated in the Gulf of Morbihan.
Anu ziggurat of Uruk		Iraq	Asia	c. 4000 – c. 3800 BCE	Ziggurat	A massive White Temple was built atop of the ziggurat. Under the northwest edge of the ziggurat a Stone Temple has been discovered.
Monte d'Accoddi		Italy (Sardinia)	Europe	c. 3800 BCE	Possibly an open-air temple, or a step pyramid.	A trapezoidal platform on an artificial mound, reached by a sloped causeway. New radiocarbon dating (2011) allow us to date the building of the first monument to 4000–3650 BCE, the second shrine dating to 3500–3000 BCE."
Knap of Howar		United Kingdom (Scotland)	Europe	c. 3800 BCE	House	Oldest preserved stone house in north west Europe.
La Hougue Bie		Jersey	Europe	c. 4000 – c. 3500 BCE	Passage grave	An 18.6 m (61 ft) long Neolithic passage grave with 12th century (medieval) chapel above and World War II structures.
Dolmen of Menga		Spain	Europe	c. 3700 BCE	Tomb	A megalithic burial mound called a tumulus, a long barrow form of dolmen
West Kennet Long Barrow		United Kingdom (England)	Europe	c. 3650 BCE	Tomb	Located near Silbury Hill and Avebury stone circle.
Ġgantija		Malta	Europe	c. 3600 BCE	Temple	Two structures on the island of Gozo. The second was built four centuries after the oldest.
Wayland's Smithy		United Kingdom (England)	Europe	c. 3570 BCE	Chamber tomb	A barrow constructed on top of an older burial chamber.
Shahr-e Sukhteh		Iran	Asia	c. 3550 BCE	Settlement	A rich source of information regarding the emergence of complex societies and contacts between them in the third millennium
Listoghil		Ireland	Europe	c. 3500 BCE	Passage Tomb	At the centre of the Carrowmore passage tomb cluster, a simple box-shaped chamber is surrounded by a kerb c.34 m (112 ft) in diameter and partly covered by a cairn. It has been partly reconstructed.
Stoney Littleton Long Barrow		United Kingdom (England)	Europe	c. 3500 BCE	Tomb	Neolithic chambered tomb with multiple burial chambers, belonging to the Severn-Cotswold group located near Wellow, Somerset, England.
Sechin Bajo		Peru	South America	c. 3500 BCE	Plaza	The oldest known building in the Americas.
Midhowe Chambered Cairn		United Kingdom (Scotland)	Europe	c. 3500 BCE	Tomb	A well-preserved chambered cairn of the Orkney-Cromarty type on the island of Rousay.
Quanterness chambered cairn		United Kingdom (Scotland)	Europe	c. 3400 BCE	Tomb	The remains of 157 individuals were found inside when excavated in the 1970s.
Loughcrew		Ireland	Europe	c. 3300 BCE	Tomb	It is the site of megalithic burial grounds dating back to approximately 3500 and 3300 BCE.
Tarxien Temples	Tarxien Temple	Malta	Europe	c. 3250 BCE	Temples	Part of the Megalithic Temples of Malta World Heritage Site.
Hulbjerg Jættestue		Denmark	Europe	c. 3250 BCE	Passage grave	The grave is concealed by a round barrow on the southern tip of the island of Langeland. One of the skulls found there showed traces of the world's earliest dentistry work.
Dolmen de Viera		Spain	Europe	c. 3250 BCE	Tomb	The Dolmen de Viera or Dolmen de los Hermanos Viera is a dolmen—a type of single-chamber megalithic tomb
Knowth		Ireland	Europe	c. 3200 BCE	Passage grave	A Neolithic passage grave and an ancient monument of the World Heritage Site of Brú na Bóinne
Dowth		Ireland	Europe	c. 3200 BCE	Tomb	The cairn is about 85 metres (280 ft) in diameter and 15 metres (50 ft) high.
Tomb of the Eagles		United Kingdom (Scotland)	Europe	c. 3200 BCE	Tomb	In use for 800 years or more. Numerous bird bones were found here, predominantly white-tailed sea eagle.
Skara Brae		United Kingdom (Scotland)	Europe	c. 3180 BCE	Settlement	Northern Europe's best preserved Neolithic village.
Unstan Chambered Cairn		United Kingdom (Scotland)	Europe	c. 3100 BCE	Tomb	Excavated in 1884, when grave goods were found, giving their name to Unstan ware.
Newgrange		Ireland	Europe	c. 3100 BCE	Burial	Partially reconstructed around original passage grave.
Knowe of Yarso chambered cairn		United Kingdom (Scotland)	Europe	c. 3000 BCE	Tomb	One of several Rousay tombs. It contained numerous deer skeletons when excavated in the 1930s.
Tepe Sialk ziggurat		Iran	Asia	c. 3000 BCE	Ziggurat	The oldest settlements in Sialk to date to around 6000–5500 BCE The Sialk ziggurat was built around 3000 BCE.
Dolmen de Bagneux		France	Europe	c. 3000 BCE	Dolmen	This is the largest dolmen in France, and perhaps the world; the overall length of the dolmen is 23 m (75 ft), with the internal chamber at over 18 m (59 ft) in length and at least 3 m (9.8 ft) high.
Grey Cairns of Camster		United Kingdom (Scotland)	Europe	c. 3000 BCE	Tomb	Located near Upper Camster in Caithness.
Dolmens of North Caucasus		Russia	Europe	c. 3000 BCE	Tomb	There are numerous tombs, some perhaps originating in the Maikop culture, in the North Caucasus.
Taversöe Tuick chambered cairn		United Kingdom (Scotland)	Europe	c. 3000 BCE	Tomb	Unusually, there is an upper and lower chamber.
Holm of Papa chambered cairn		United Kingdom (Scotland)	Europe	c. 3000 BCE	Tomb	The central chamber is over 20 m (66 ft) long.
Barpa Langass		United Kingdom (Scotland)	Europe	c. 3000 BCE	Tomb	The best preserved chambered cairn in the Hebrides.
Cuween Hill Chambered Cairn		United Kingdom (Scotland)	Europe	c. 3000 BCE	Tomb	Excavated in 1901, when it was found to contain the bones of men, dogs and oxen.
Quoyness cairn		United Kingdom (Scotland)	Europe	c. 3000 BCE	Tomb	An arc of Bronze Age mounds surrounds this cairn on the island of Sanday.
Maeshowe		United Kingdom (Scotland)	Europe	c. 2800 BCE	Tomb	The entrance passage is 36 feet (11 m) long and leads to the central chamber measuring about 15 feet (4.6 m) on each side.
Vinquoy chambered cairn		United Kingdom (Scotland)	Europe	c. 2750 BCE	Tomb	
Shunet El Zebib		Egypt	Africa	c. 2700 BCE	Mortuary temple	Built as a funerary enclosure, a place where the deceased king was worshipped and memorialised.
Pyramid of Djoser		Egypt	Africa	c. 2670 – c. 2650 BCE	Burial	Earliest large-scale cut stone construction.
The Great Deffufa		Sudan	Africa	c. 2500–2000 BCE	Temple	Earliest large scale mudbrick momentum.
Dholavira		India	Asia	c. 2650 BCE	Settlement	A complex of ruins with varying dates at Dholavira. It has brick water reservoirs, with steps, circular graves and the ruins of a well planned town. Recent research suggests the beginning of occupation around 3500 BCE (pre-Harappan) and continuity until around 1800 BCE (early part of Late Harappan period).
Harappa		Pakistan	Asia	c. 2600 BCE	Settlement	A Bronze Age fortified city with clay sculptured houses located west of Sahiwal. The Indus Valley civilization had a possible writing system, urban centers, and diversified social and economic system.
Mohenjo-daro		Pakistan	Asia	c. 2600 BCE	Settlement	An archaeological site near Larkana The world's earliest settlement with one and two storied brick houses, public baths, assembly halls, central marketplace and covered drains.
Caral		Peru	South America	c. 2600 BCE	Pyramid	Once thought to be the oldest building in South America
Pyramid of Meidum		Egypt	Africa	c. 2580 BCE	Tomb	Fourth Dynasty structure completed by Sneferu.
Bent Pyramid		Egypt	Africa	c. 2580 BCE	Tomb	A second structure completed by Sneferu.
Red Pyramid		Egypt	Africa	c. 2580 BCE	Tomb	Third large pyramid completed by Sneferu.
Great Pyramid of Giza		Egypt	Africa	c. 2560 BCE	Tomb	Mausoleum for fourth dynasty Egyptian Pharaoh Khufu. World's tallest man-made structure for over 3800 years, until Lincoln Cathedral in 1311.
Pyramid of Khafre		Egypt	Africa	c. 2550 BCE	Tomb	One of the Pyramids of Giza.
Pyramid of Menkaure		Egypt	Africa	c. 2510 BCE	Tomb	Menkaure was probably Khafre's successor.
Megalithic Monuments of Alcalar		Portugal	Europe	c. 2500 BCE	Tomb	A group of burial tombs that comprise a Calcolithic necropolis.
Capel Garmon		United Kingdom (Wales)	Europe	c. 2500 BCE	Tomb	Burial chamber dating from the 3rd millennium BCE that belongs to the Severn-Cotswold Group.
Royal Palace of Mari		Syria	Asia	c. 2500 BCE	Palace	Located in the ancient Kingdom of Mari in eastern Syria, the Palace covered more than two hectares, and included some 300 rooms, corridors, and courtyards.
Western Deffufa		Sudan	Africa	c. 2500 BCE	Temple	The Western Deffufa is a temple rising around 20 meters high, and built from sun baked mudbricks. It was central to the civilization of Kerma.
Pyramid of Userkaf		Egypt	Africa	c. 2490 BCE	Tomb	Located close to Pyramid of Djoser.
Pyramid of Sahure		Egypt	Africa	c. 2480 BCE	Tomb	Built for Sahure.
Pyramid of Neferirkare Kakai		Egypt	Africa	c. 2460 BCE	Tomb	Built for Neferirkare Kakai.
Pyramid of Neferefre		Egypt	Africa	c. 2460 – c. 2440 BCE	Tomb	Never completed but does contain a tomb.
Pyramid of Nyuserre		Egypt	Africa	c. 2430 BCE	Tomb	
Pyramid of Djedkare Isesi		Egypt	Africa	c. 2375 BCE	Tomb	
Pyramid of Unas		Egypt	Africa	c. 2350 BCE	Tomb	
Pyramid of Teti		Egypt	Africa	c. 2340 BCE	Tomb	
Royal Palace of Ebla		Syria	Asia	c. 2400 – c. 2300 BCE	Palace	
Labbacallee		Ireland	Europe	c. 2300 BCE	Tomb	The largest wedge tomb in Ireland.
Shimao		China (Shaanxi)	Asia	c. 2300 BCE	Settlement	Fortified Neolithic site, centered on a large stepped pyramid with a height of 70 meters.
Pyramid of Merenre		Egypt	Africa	c. 2280 BCE	Tomb	Built for Merenre Nemtyemsaf I but not completed.
Pyramid of Pepi II		Egypt	Africa	c. 2250 BCE	Tomb	
Crantit		United Kingdom (Scotland)	Europe	c. 2130 BCE	Tomb	Discovered in 1998 near Kirkwall.
Ziggurat of Ur		Iraq	Asia	c. 2100 BCE	Temple	The Great Ziggurat of Ur was a temple built under King Ur-Nammu in honor of the goddess Nanna. It was partially reconstructed in the 1980s under Saddam Hussein.
Dolmen of Cava dei Servi		Italy (Sicily)	Europe	2000 BCE	Tomb	The dolmen of Cava dei Servi is a semi-oval monument formed by four rectangular slabs fixed into the ground. Three slabs are on top, leaning in such a way they reduce the surface and form a false dome.
Rubha an Dùnain passage grave		United Kingdom (Scotland)	Europe	2000 BCE or older	Tomb	
Corrimony chambered cairn		United Kingdom (Scotland)	Europe	2000 BCE or older	Tomb	A Clava-type passage grave surrounded by a circle of 11 standing stones.
Bryn Celli Ddu		United Kingdom (Wales)	Europe	2000 BCE	Tomb	Located on the island of Anglesey.
Pyramid of Amenemhat I		Egypt	Africa	c. 1960 BCE	Tomb	
Karnak		Egypt	Africa	1971–1926 BCE	Temple	Actually a temple complex
Pyramid of Senusret I		Egypt	Africa	c. 1920 BCE	Tomb	
Pyramid of Senusret II		Egypt	Africa	c. 1875 BCE	Tomb	
Knossos		Greece	Europe	1850–1750 BCE	Palace	Minoan structure on a Neolithic site
Pyramid of Senusret III		Egypt	Africa	c. 1835 BCE	Tomb	Built for Senusret III.
Black Pyramid		Egypt	Africa	c. 1820 BCE	Tomb	Built for Amenemhat III, it has multiple structural deficits.
Hawara		Egypt	Africa	c. 1810 BCE	Tomb	Also built for Amenemhat III.
Pyramid of Khendjer		Egypt	Africa	c. 1760 BCE	Tomb	Built for pharaoh Khendjer.
Daorson	Cyclopean walls of Daorson	Bosnia and Herzegovina	Europe	17–16th century BCE	City and citadel	Illyrian settlement and capital of Daorsi tribe.
Mortuary Temple of Hatshepsut		Egypt	Africa	15th century BCE	Temple	
Hundatorra		United Kingdom (England)	Europe	c.1700-1200 BCE	Settlement	
Nuraghe Santu Antine		Italy (Sardinia)	Europe	1600 BCE	Possibly a fort	The second tallest of these megalithic edifices found in Sardinia and tallest still standing.
Sinauli		India	Asia	1800 BCE	Settlement	The Sinauli excavation site is located in Sinauli, western Uttar Pradesh, India, at the Ganga-Yamuna Doab. Major findings from 2018 trial excavations are dated to c. 2000 – 1800 BCE, and ascribed to the Ochre Coloured Pottery culture (OCP)/Copper Hoard Culture. The rituals relating to the Sanauli burials shows close affinity with Vedic rituals.
Royal Palace of Ugarit		Syria	Asia	1500 BCE	Palace	Located in the ancient Kingdom of Ugarit on the Syrian coast, the Palace covers an area of 6,500 square metres.
Adichanallur		India	Asia	1500 BCE	Settlement	In 2004, a number of skeletons were found buried in earthenware urns. Some of these urns contained writing in Tamil Brahmi script. While some of the burial urns contained skeletons. In 2018, research on skeletons remains were dated at Manipur University to around 1500 BCE.
Su Nuraxi di Barumini		Italy (Sardinia)	Europe	1500 BCE	Possibly a fort or a palace	The palace of Barumini is formed by a huge quatrefoiled nuraghe, whose central tower is its oldest construction. Originally it was almost 20 m (66 ft) high and divided into three floors.
Luxor Temple		Egypt	Africa	c.1400 BCE	Temple	Actually a temple complex
Nuraghe La Prisciona		Italy (Sardinia)	Europe	1400 BCE	Possibly a fort	The monument has a central tower and 2 side towers, the former with an entrance defined by a massive lintel of 3.20 m (10.5 ft). The central chamber has a false dome, which is more than 6 m (20 ft) high.
The King's Grave		Sweden	Europe	1400 BCE	Tomb	Near Kivik is the remains of an unusually grand Nordic Bronze Age double burial.
The Ziggurat of Dur-Kurigalzu		Iraq	Asia	14th century BCE	Probably religious rituals	Built for the Kassite King Kurigalzu I.
Treasury of Atreus		Greece	Europe	1250 BCE	Tomb	The tallest and widest dome in the world for over a thousand years.
Chogha Zanbil		Iran	Asia	1250 BCE	Temple	One of the few extant ziggurats outside of Mesopotamia.
Mortuary Temple of Seti I		Egypt	Africa	13th century BCE	Temple	
Ramesseum		Egypt	Africa	13th century BCE	Temple	Mortuary temple of Ramses II
Naveta d'Es Tudons		Spain	Europe	1200–750 BCE	Ossuary	The most famous megalithic chamber tomb in Menorca.
Mortuary Temple of Ramesses III		Egypt	Africa	1186–1155 BCE	Temple	
Dún Aonghasa		Ireland	Europe	1100 BCE	Fort	Dún Aonghasa, also called Dun Aengus, has been described as one of the most spectacular prehistoric monuments in western Europe. The drystone walled hillfort is made up of 4 widely spaced concentric ramparts.
Yeha Temple		Ethiopia	Africa	800-700 BCE	Temple	Temple of the sun and moon.Oldest standing structure in Ethiopia
Cuicuilco Circular Pyramid		Mexico	North America	800–600 BCE	Ceremonial center	One of the oldest standing structures of the Mesoamerican cultures. First steps in the creation of a sun based calendar.
Van Fortress		Turkey	Asia	750 BCE	Fortress	Massive Urartean stone fortification overlooking Tushpa.
Necropolises of Cerveteri and Tarquinia		Italy	Europe	700 BCE	Tombs	These Etruscan necropolises contain thousands of tombs, some organized in a city-like plan.
Temple of Cyrene		Libya	Africa	c. 630 BCE	Temple	The temple was destroyed and rebuilt around 115 CE and was damaged in the 4th century CE.
Keezhadi excavation site		India	Asia	580 BCE	Settlement	Keezhadi (also as Keeladi) excavation site is a Sangam period settlement that is being excavated by the Archaeological Survey of India and the Tamil Nadu Archaeology Department.
Temple of Hera		Italy	Europe	550 BCE	Temple	Part of a complex of three great temples in Doric style.
Tomb of Cyrus		Iran	Asia	530 BCE	Tomb	Tomb of Cyrus the Great, located in Pasargadae
Persepolis		Iran	Asia	522 BCE	Ceremonial capital	Ceremonial capital of the Achaemenid Empire
Parthenon		Greece	Europe	432–447 BCE	Temple	In the Acropolis of Athens
Tomb of Seuthes III	Tomb of Seuthes III	Bulgaria	Europe	450–400 BCE	Tomb	The tomb was originally a monumental temple at Golyama Kosmatka Mound, built in the second half of the 5th century BCE. After extended use as a temple, at the later part of the 3rd century BCE the Thracian king Seuthes III was buried inside.
Thracian Tomb of Kazanlak		Bulgaria	Europe	300–400 BCE	Tomb	Located near Seutopolis, the capital city of the Thracian king Seuthes III, and part of a large necropolis. It is one of the most elaborate tombs in the Valley of the Thracian Rulers where the first use of brickwork in Europe was established.
Sanchi Stupa		India	Asia	300 BCE	Buddhist temple	In the village of Sanchi
Thracian Tomb of Sveshtari	The Entrance to the Tomb Mound	Bulgaria	Europe	300–280 BCE	Tomb	Discovered in 1982 in a mound, this 3rd century BCE Getic tomb reflects the fundamental structural principles of Thracian cult buildings. The tomb's architectural decor is considered to be unique, with polychrome half-human, half-plant caryatids and painted murals.
Dhamek Stupa		India	Asia	249 BCE rebuilt c. 500 CE	Buddhist Temple	In Sarnath, Varanasi
Mausoleum of the First Qin Emperor		China	Asia	Began construction 246 BCE, finished 208 BCE	Tomb	Commonly known as the Terracotta Army, this is one of the largest tombs ever built. It does not only contain the entire stone army, but a complex of halls and of the resting place of Qin Shi Huang.
Ruwanwelisaya		Sri Lanka	Asia	140 BCE	Stupa	In Anuradhapura, Sri Lanka
Broch of Mousa		United Kingdom (Scotland)	Europe	100 BCE	Broch	Located in Shetland it is among the best-preserved prehistoric buildings in Europe.
Dun Carloway		United Kingdom (Scotland)	Europe	100 BCE	Broch	Built in the first century BCE
Masada		Israel	Asia	37 BCE	Fortress	Herod the Great built two palaces for himself on the mountain and fortified Masada between 37 and 31 BCE.
Maison Carrée		France	Europe	4–7 CE	Temple	one of the best preserved Roman temples, in Nîmes
Lei Cheng Uk Han Tomb Museum		China (Hong Kong)	Asia	25 CE	Tomb	
Temple of Garni		Armenia	Asia	c. 77 CE	Temple	
Colosseum		Italy	Europe	70–80 CE	Amphitheatre	

== By continent ==
The following are amongst the oldest known extant buildings on each of the major continents.

Building	Image	Country	Continent	First built	Use	Notes
Towers of Tell Qaramel		Syria	Asia	10650–9650 BCE	Tower	Located in Aleppo Governorate, five stone towers were found at Tell Qaramel; dated to the period from the middle of the 11th millennium BCE to about 9650 BCE, making them the oldest structures of this type in the world.
Durankulak (archaeological site)		Bulgaria	Europe	5500—4100 BCE	Settlement	The Durankulak Archaeological Complex unites three sites: Tell Golemija ostrov – the Big Island, Durankulak – the necropolis and Durankulak – the fields. On the Tell Golemija ostrov (Big Island) there are settlements from the Early Eneolithic – Hamandjia III–IV culture, the Late Eneolithic – Varna culture, ritual pits and sacrificial pylons from the Proto-Bronze and Bronze Ages – Chernavoda I and III cultures, fortified Late Bronze Age settlement – Koslogeni culture (Sabatinovka-Noua-Coslogeni "cultural complex"), ancient buildings with a cave temple of the goddess Cybele and an early medieval proto-Bulgarian settlement with several rotundas, which existed from the 9th to the beginning of the 11th century CE. The total thickness of the cultural strata is 3.20 – 3.50 m. The settlement mound has seven stratigraphic horizons.
Solnitsata	Solnitsata	Bulgaria	Europe	5500 BCE	Settlement	Believed to be the oldest town in Europe, Solnitsata was the site of a prehistoric fortified (walled) stone settlement (prehistoric city) and salt production facility approximately from the 6th – 5th millennia BCE; it flourished c. 4700–4200 BCE. A large collection of the oldest gold objects in the world was found nearby, in the Varna Necropolis
Shunet El Zebib		Egypt	Africa	2700 BCE	Mortuary temple	Built as a funerary enclosure, a place where the deceased king was worshipped and memorialised.
Los Naranjos		Honduras	North America	2000 BCE	Temples	Oldest extant buildings in Honduras, constructed by ancestors of the Lenca people.
Nan Madol		Federated States of Micronesia	Oceania	700s CE	City	City constructed by the Pohnpeians in the 700s CE on human-made islands (also created by the Pohnpeians). Nan Madol contains the oldest known extant buildings in Oceania.
Cape Adare huts		Ross Dependency	Antarctica	1899 CE	Explorers' huts	Wooden buildings constructed by Carsten Borchgrevink in Victoria Land.

== By country ==
The following are among the oldest buildings in their respective countries.

Building	Image	Country	Continent	First Built	Use	Notes
Towers of Tell Qaramel		Syria	Asia	10650–9650 BCE	Tower	Located in Aleppo Governorate, five stone towers were found at Tell Qaramel; dated to the period from the middle of the 11th millennium BCE to about 9650 BCE, making them the oldest structures of this type in the world.
Göbeklitepe		Turkey	Asia	9500–7500 BCE	Unknown/likely temple	Oldest temple in the world.
Durankulak		Bulgaria	Europe	5500—4100 BCE	Settlement	The Durankulak Archaeological Complex unites three sites: Tell Golemija ostrov – the Big Island, Durankulak – the necropolis and Durankulak – the fields. On the Tell Golemija ostrov (Big Island) there are settlements from the Early Eneolithic – Hamandjia III–IV culture, the Late Eneolithic – Varna culture, ritual pits and sacrificial pylons from the Proto-Bronze and Bronze Ages – Chernavoda I and III cultures, fortified Late Bronze Age settlement – Koslogeni culture (Sabatinovka-Noua-Coslogeni "cultural complex"), ancient buildings with a cave temple of the goddess Cybele and an early medieval proto-Bulgarian settlement with several rotundas, which existed from the 9th to the beginning of the 11th century CE. The total thickness of the cultural strata is 3.20 – 3.50 m. The settlement mound has seven stratigraphic horizons.
Solnitsata	Solnitsata	Bulgaria	Europe	5500 BCE	Settlement	Believed to be the oldest town in Europe, Solnitsata was the site of a prehistoric fortified stone settlement and salt production facility approximately six millennia ago; it flourished c. 4700–4200 BCE. The settlement was walled to protect the salt, a crucial commodity in antiquity. Although its population has been estimated at only 350, archaeologist Vassil Nikolov argues that it meets established criteria as a prehistoric city. A large collection of the oldest gold objects in the world find nearby, on the site of the Varna Necropolis, has led archaeologists to speculate that this trade resulted in considerable wealth for the town's residents.
L'Anse aux Meadows		Canada	North America	c. 1000 CE	Settlement	Located on the northernmost tip of the island of Newfoundland, the Norse settlement is widely accepted as evidence of pre-Columbian trans-oceanic contact.
Shimao		China	Asia	2300–2000 BCE	Settlement	Fortified Neolithic site, centered on a large stepped pyramid with a height of 70 m.
St. George's Basilica, Prague		Czech Republic	Europe	c. 920 CE	Church	Located within Prague Castle in the Czech Republic capital Prague. The building now houses the 19th century Bohemian Art Collection of National Gallery in Prague.
Hulbjerg Jættestue		Denmark	Europe	3000 BCE	Passage grave	The Hulbjerg passage grave is concealed by a round barrow on the southern tip of the island of Langeland. One of the skulls found there showed traces of the world's earliest dentistry work.
West Kennet Long Barrow		United Kingdom (England)	Europe	3650 BCE	Tomb	Located near Silbury Hill and Avebury stone circle.
Barnenez		France	Europe	4850 BCE	Passage grave	Located in northern Finistère and partially restored. The structure is 72 m long, 25 m wide and over 8 m high. The oldest known building in Eurasia.
Porta Nigra		Germany	Europe	180 CE	Roman city gate	It is today the largest Roman city gate north of the Alps.
Knossos		Greece	Europe	2000–1300 BCE	Palace	Minoan structure on a Neolithic site.
Dholavira		India	Asia	3500 BCE	Reservoir	A planned urban settlement comprising reservoirs, pottery artifacts, seals, ornaments, vessels, etc.
Chogha Zanbil		Iran	Asia	1250 BCE	Temple	One of the few extant ziggurats outside of Mesopotamia
The Ziggurat of Dur-Kurigalzu		Iraq	Asia	14th century BCE	Probably religious rituals	Built by the Kassite King Kurigalzu I
Newgrange		Ireland	Europe	3200–2900 BCE	Burial	Partially reconstructed around original passage grave
Monte d'Accoddi		Italy (Sardinia)	Europe	4000–3600 BCE	Possibly an open-air temple, a ziggurat, or a step pyramid, mastaba	"A trapezoidal platform on an artificial mound, reached by a sloped causeway."
Ġgantija		Malta	Europe	3700 BCE	Temple	Two structures on the island of Gozo. The second was built four centuries after the oldest.
Cuicuilco Circular Pyramid		Mexico	North America	800–600 BCE	Ceremonial center	One of the oldest standing structures of the Mesoamerican cultures
Hunebed (Dolmen)		Netherlands	Europe	4000–3000 BCE	Burial	Common theory states Hunebedden of dolmen are prehistoric burial chambers.
Mission House		New Zealand		1822 CE	Religious	Built by Māori and missionary carpenters
Mehrgarh		Pakistan	Asia	c. 2600 BCE	Mud brick storage structures	A complex of ruins with varying dates near Bolan Pass
Sechin Bajo		Peru	South America	3500 BCE	Plaza	The oldest known building in the Americas
Dolmens of North Caucasus		Russia	Europe	3000 BCE	Tomb	There are numerous tombs, some perhaps originating in the Maikop culture, in the North Caucasus.
Knap of Howar		United Kingdom (Scotland)	Europe	3700 BCE	House	Oldest preserved stone house in north west Europe
Naveta d'Es Tudons		Spain	Europe	1200–750 BCE	Ossuary	The most famous megalithic chamber tomb in Menorca
The King's Grave		Sweden	Europe	1000 BCE	Tomb	Near Kivik is the remains of an unusually grand Nordic Bronze Age double burial.
Hattusa		Turkey	Asia	c. 1600 BCE	Ramparts and ruined buildings	Capital of the Hittite Empire in the late Bronze Age located near modern Boğazkale
Saint Sophia Cathedral, Kyiv		Ukraine	Europe	1037 CE	Cathedral	Orthodox cathedral, partially rebuilt
Ancestral Puebloan communities		United States	North America	750 CE	Villages	Pueblo construction began in 750 CE and continues to the present day. These buildings have been within the United States since 1848.
Bryn Celli Ddu		United Kingdom (Wales)	Europe	2000 BCE	Tomb	Located on the island of Anglesey
Great Zimbabwe		Zimbabwe	Africa	1000 CE	Palace	Capital of the medieval kingdom

== By function, structure and building material ==
The following are probably the oldest buildings of their type.

Building	Image	Location	First built	Use	Notes
Towers of Tell Qaramel		Syria	10650–9650 BCE	Tower	Located in Aleppo Governorate, five stone towers were found at Tell Qaramel; dated to the period from the middle of the 11th millennium BCE to about 9650 BCE, making them the oldest structures of this type in the world.
Göbekli Tepe		Turkey	9500–7500 BCE	Unknown, likely temple	Located in southern Turkey. The tell includes two phases of use, believed to be of a social or ritual nature by site discoverer and excavator Klaus Schmidt, dating back to the 10th–8th millennium BCE. The structure is 300 m in diameter and 15 m high.
Mehrgarh		Pakistan	7000 BCE	Settlement	A Neolithic archaeological site situated on the Kacchi Plain of Balochistan in Pakistan. It is located near the Bolan Pass, to the west of the Indus River and between the modern-day Pakistani cities of Quetta, Kalat and Sibi.
Durankulak (archaeological site)		Bulgaria	4800–4100 BCE	Settlement	Durankulak is located in Bulgaria, on the west coast of the Black Sea, Dbruja district. The earliest stone architecture in continental Europe was discovered here.
Pyramid of Djoser		Saqqara, Egypt	2667–2648 BCE	Tomb	Oldest large-scale cut stone construction
Luxor Temple		Luxor, Egypt	1400 BCE	Religious	The oldest standing building partly in use. There is an active mosque within the main structure, visible in the picture, that stands on the ancient pillars of the Egyptian temple.
Temple of Concordia		Italy	440 BCE	Temple	Oldest fully preserved temple from Antiquity
Sanchi Stupa		India	300 BCE	Buddhist temple	Oldest extant Buddhist temple
Mundeshwari Temple		Bihar, India	105–320 CE	Hindu Temple	May be the oldest extant (not rebuilt) Hindu temple in the world An information plaque at the site indicates the dating of the temple at least to 625 CE and Hindu inscriptions dated 635 CE were found in the temple.
Pantheon, Rome		Italy	125 CE	Religious	Oldest standing building still in regular use
Aula Palatina		Germany	306 CE	Palace basilica	Contains the largest extant hall from antiquity.
Jokhang		Lhasa, Tibet, China	c. 639 CE	Buddhist temple	Perhaps the world's oldest timber-frame building.
Hōryū-ji		Nara, Japan	670 CE	Buddhist Temple	Oldest wooden building still standing
Nanchan Temple		Wutai, China	782 CE	Buddhist Temple	Its Great Buddha Hall is currently China's oldest extant timber building.
Greensted Church		United Kingdom (England)	c. 1053 CE	Church	May be the oldest, extant wooden church in the world and the oldest, extant wooden building in Europe.
Roykstovan in Kirkjubø		Faroe Islands	No clear date, middle of 11th century CE	Farmhouse	May be the oldest continuously inhabited wooden building in the world
Ditherington Flax Mill		United Kingdom (England, Shrewsbury)	1797 CE	Industrial	The oldest iron framed building in the world
Shed Number 78, Sheerness Dockyard		United Kingdom (England, Sheerness)	1860 CE	Industrial	Oldest multi-storey iron-frame and panel structure
Manhattan Building		Chicago, United States	1888 CE	Skyscraper	Oldest skyscraper still standing

== See also ==
Lists

- List of oldest buildings in Scotland
- List of oldest buildings in the Americas
- List of oldest buildings in the United Kingdom
- List of oldest church buildings
- List of oldest continuously inhabited cities
- List of oldest synagogues
- List of the oldest buildings in the United States
- List of the oldest mosques

Sites

- Los Millares, a Chalcolithic site in Almería, Spain including both ruins and reconstructions
- Antequera Dolmens Site, Antequera Málaga Spain, a cultural heritage ensemble comprising 3 cultural monuments.
