= Proto-city =

Prehistoric settlement that has both rural and urban features

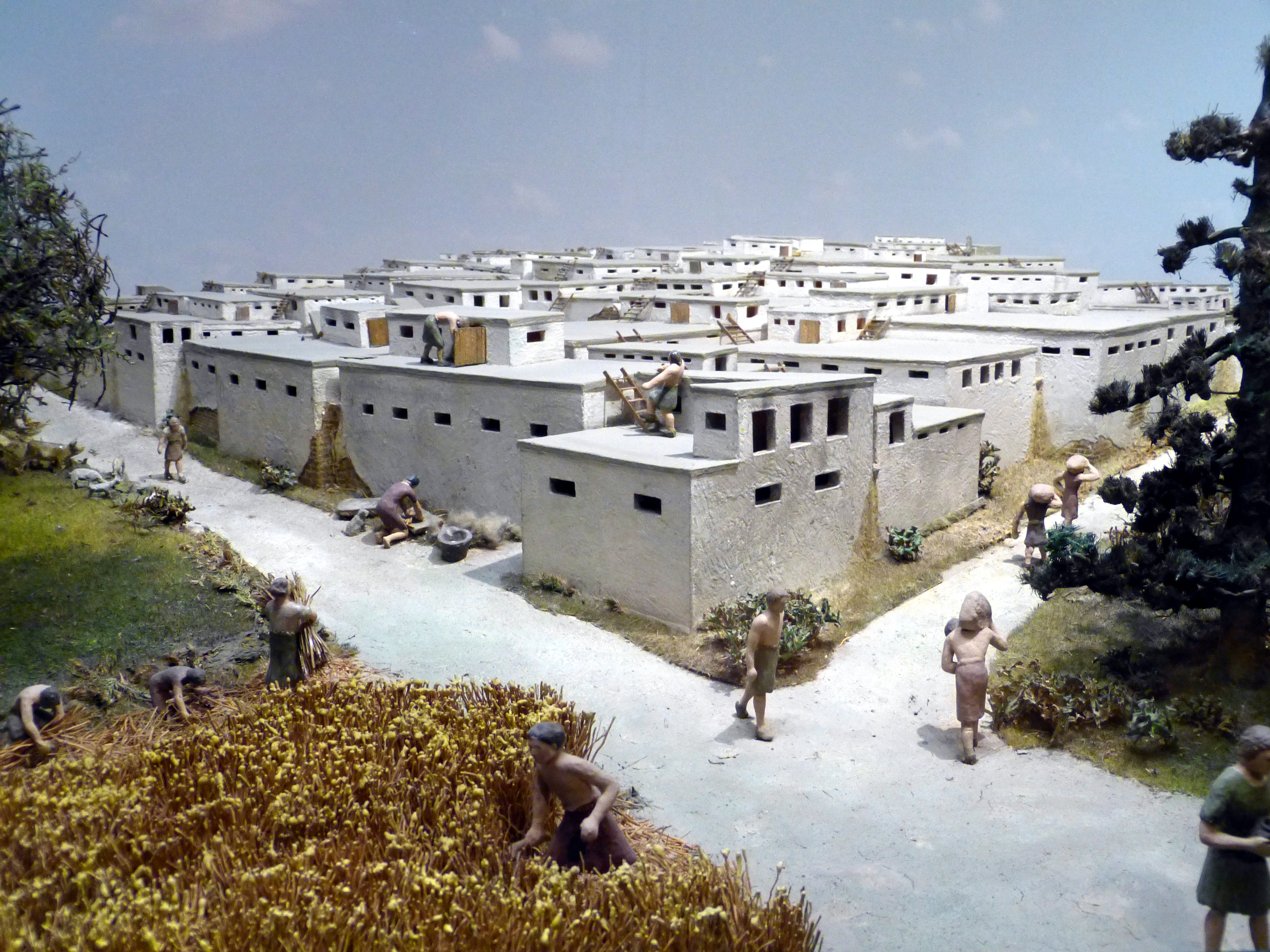
A model of Çatalhöyük, a commonly cited example of a proto-city.

A proto-city is a large, dense Neolithic settlement that is largely distinguished from a city by its lack of planning and centralized rule. The term mega-sites is also used. While the precise classification of many sites considered proto-cities is ambiguous and subject to considerable debate, common examples include sites of the Pre-Pottery Neolithic B culture and following cultures in the Fertile Crescent such as Jericho and Çatalhöyük, sites of the Cucuteni-Trypillia culture in Southeast Europe, and of the Ubaid period in Mesopotamia. These sites pre-date the Mesopotamian city-states of the Uruk period that mark the development of the first indisputable urban settlements, with the emergence of cities such as Uruk at the end of the Fourth Millennium, B.C.

The emergence of cities from proto-urban settlements is a non-linear development that demonstrates the varied experiences of early urbanization. Whilst the proto-urban sites of the Ubaid period in northern Mesopotamia anticipate the social and political developments of the first Sumerian cities, many proto-cities show little correlation with later urban settlements. The development of cities and proto-cities and the transition away from hunting and gathering toward agriculture is known as the Neolithic Revolution.

== Definition ==
The label of a proto-city is applied to Neolithic mega-sites that are large and population-dense for their time but lack most other characteristics that are found in later urban settlements such as those of the Mesopotamian city-states in the 4th Millennium B.C. These later urban sites are commonly distinguished by a dense, stratified population alongside a level of organisation that facilitated the building of public works, the redistribution of food surpluses and raids into surrounding areas. In contrast, proto-urban sites such as Çatalhöyük are population dense but lack clear signs of central control and social stratification, such as large public works.

== Common Examples ==
=== Jericho ===
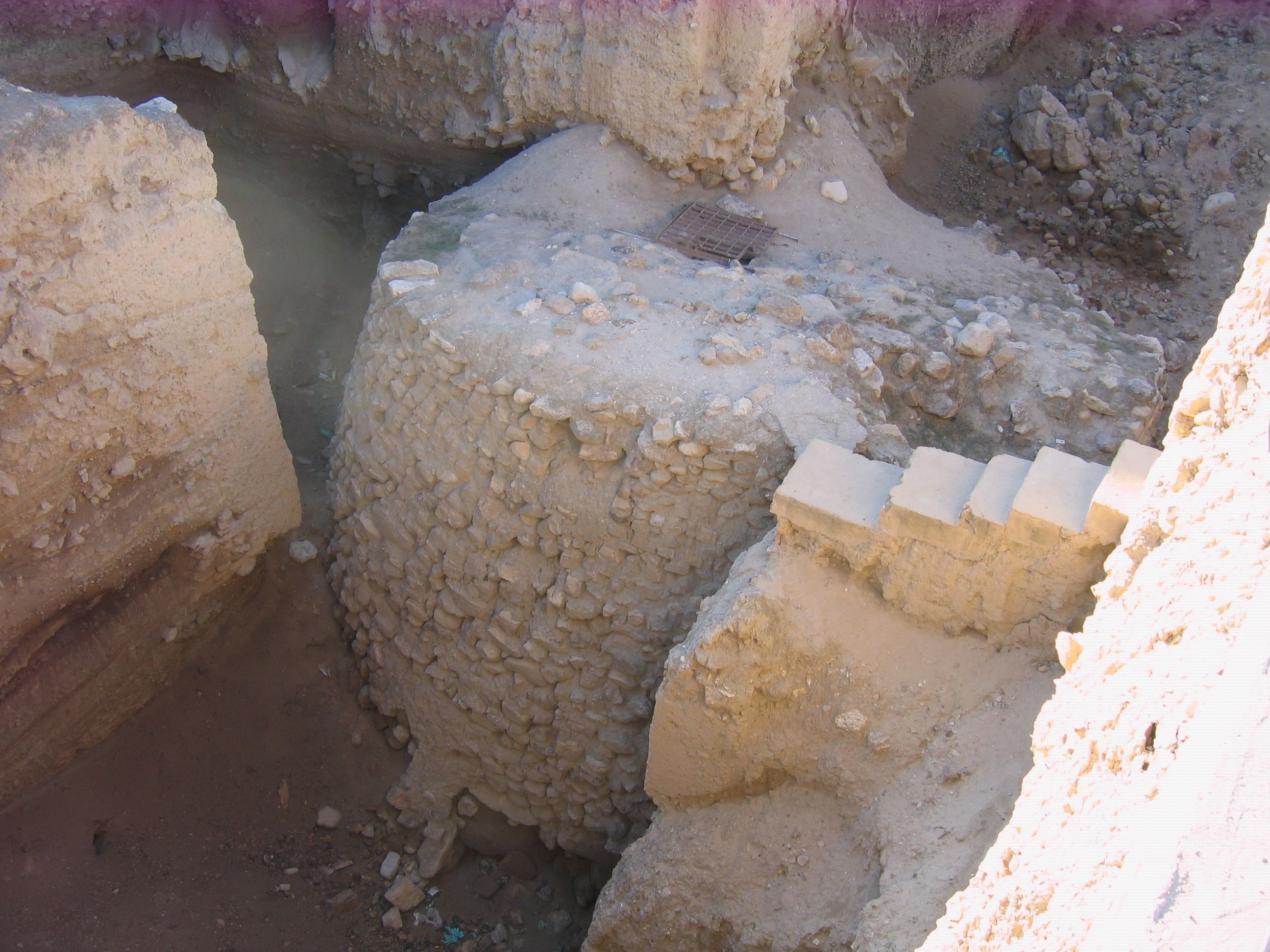
The excavated Tower of Jericho

Pre-Pottery Neolithic A Jericho was the site of a large settlement with a dense population as early as the Ninth Millennium BC, with estimates of the settlement's population ranging from 2000-3000 to only 200-300. Its proximity to fresh water from the spring at Ain es-Sultan facilitated the early development of animal husbandry and agriculture, making the site among the most advanced centres of the Neolithic Revolution in the Fertile Crescent.

The settlement was built over an area of 2 or 3 ha, and its most notable features include stone walls 3m wide and 4m tall, as well as the oldest known monumental building, the Tower of Jericho: a large stone tower 8m high and built c. 8000 BC. The Tower required substantial communal effort to build, with an estimated 10,400 person-days invested in the construction of the tower. It may have functioned as part of a fortification system, a flood-detection system, or as a symbolic monument to "motivate people to take part in a communal lifestyle". The Tower may also have been an indication of power struggles within the community, as an individual or a group may have "exploited the primeval fears of the residents and persuaded them to build it". There is also evidence of human violence at the site, as the skeletons of twelve people apparently killed in a fight or riot have been found within the tower. Thus, despite new technologies in domestication, agriculture and architecture, social organisation was still a decisive factor in the success of the settlement. In 6000 B.C., a major earthquake shifted or interrupted the Spring of Ain es-Sultan, likely causing the end of Neolithic Jericho.

=== Çatalhöyük ===
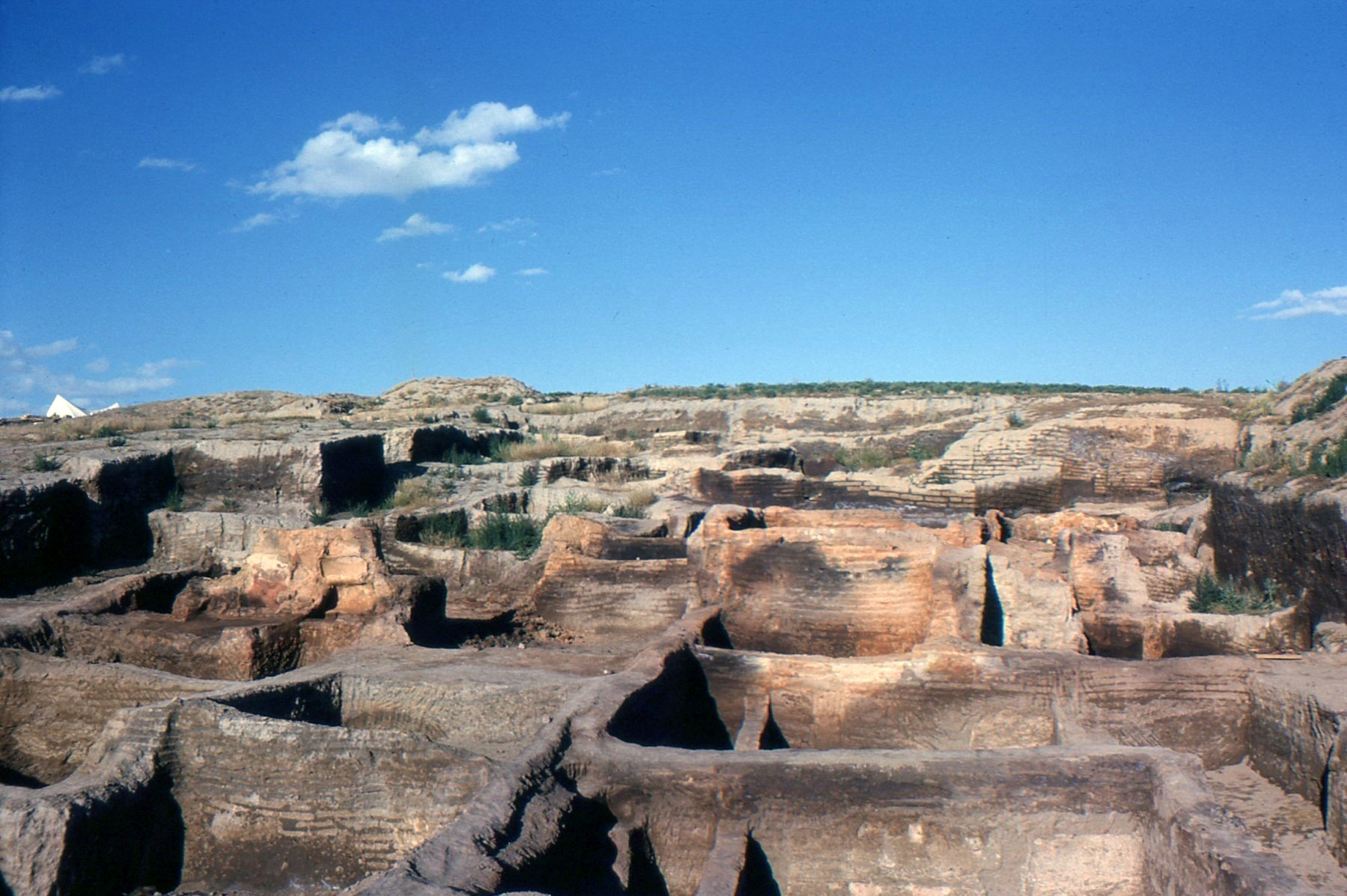
The excavated ruins of Çatalhöyük.

Çatalhöyük is a mega-site of the Neolithic in Southern Anatolia that was inhabited from 7100-6000 B.C., and had a population of up to 8000 people in a site measuring 34 acres. The site consists of sequences of mudbrick buildings built atop one another and separated by spaces for middens and livestock. Rather than showing signs of deliberate planning, Çatalhöyük displays an "organic modular development through the repetition of similar units (buildings)". Individual houses were largely self-sufficient in function, lacking specialisation. For example, there were no assigned builders of houses, and the bricks used to build them differed in composition and shape. There is some evidence of long-distance trade, with possible value-added production occurring with imports of obsidian from Cappadocia, 170 km away. The site has little evidence of significant social stratification or centralised authority, yet the complex culture and longevity of the settlement suggests different methods of achieving social cohesion.

=== Cucuteni-Trypillia Culture ===
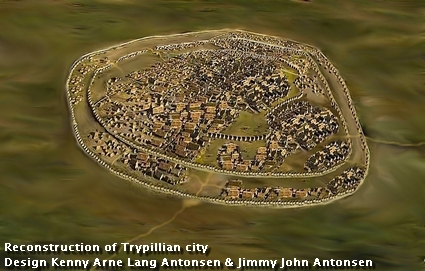
A reconstruction of a Cucuteni-Trypillian site.

The Cucuteni-Trypillia culture (4100-3400 B.C.) is notable for creating the largest settlements in south-eastern Europe during the Neolithic-Eneolithic that range between 100 and 340 ha. Owing to their size, the mega-sites created by the Cucuteni-Trypillia culture is classified by some as proto-cities.

The Cucuteni-Trypillian site of Nebelivka in Ukraine features approximately 1500 structures organised into two concentric circles with inner streets that separate the settlement into 14 quarters and over 140 neighbourhoods. Despite this layout suggesting planning from a central authority, individual neighbourhoods feature a high degree of variability, and the site is undistinguishable from preceding or contemporary settlements in terms of economy and trade. Social tensions and population pressures resulting from the dense settlements of the Cucuteni-Trypillian culture may have instead been resolved by constant migration as opposed to the development of new social and political institutions in a sedentary population. It is thus ambiguous if the sites of the Cucuteni-Trypillian culture represent an urbanisation process.

== Development of cities ==
The development of cities from proto-urban sites was not a linear progression in most cases. Rather, proto-cities are defined as "early experiments" in high-density living that "did not develop further", particularly in their level of population, suggesting a more flexible and complex trajectory to urbanisation.

Alternatively, a number of proto-urban population centres such as Tell Brak in Northern Mesopotamia in the fourth millennium B.C. can be considered "successful experiments" that adopted new social and political institutions to mitigate internal conflicts. These sites anticipate the administrative practices of Southern Mesopotamian city-states such as Uruk, such as the use of seals to denote ownership or control. At Tell Brak, a stamp sealing with a motif of a lion suggests the authority of a senior official; in later periods Mesopotamians considered the lion a symbol of kingship.

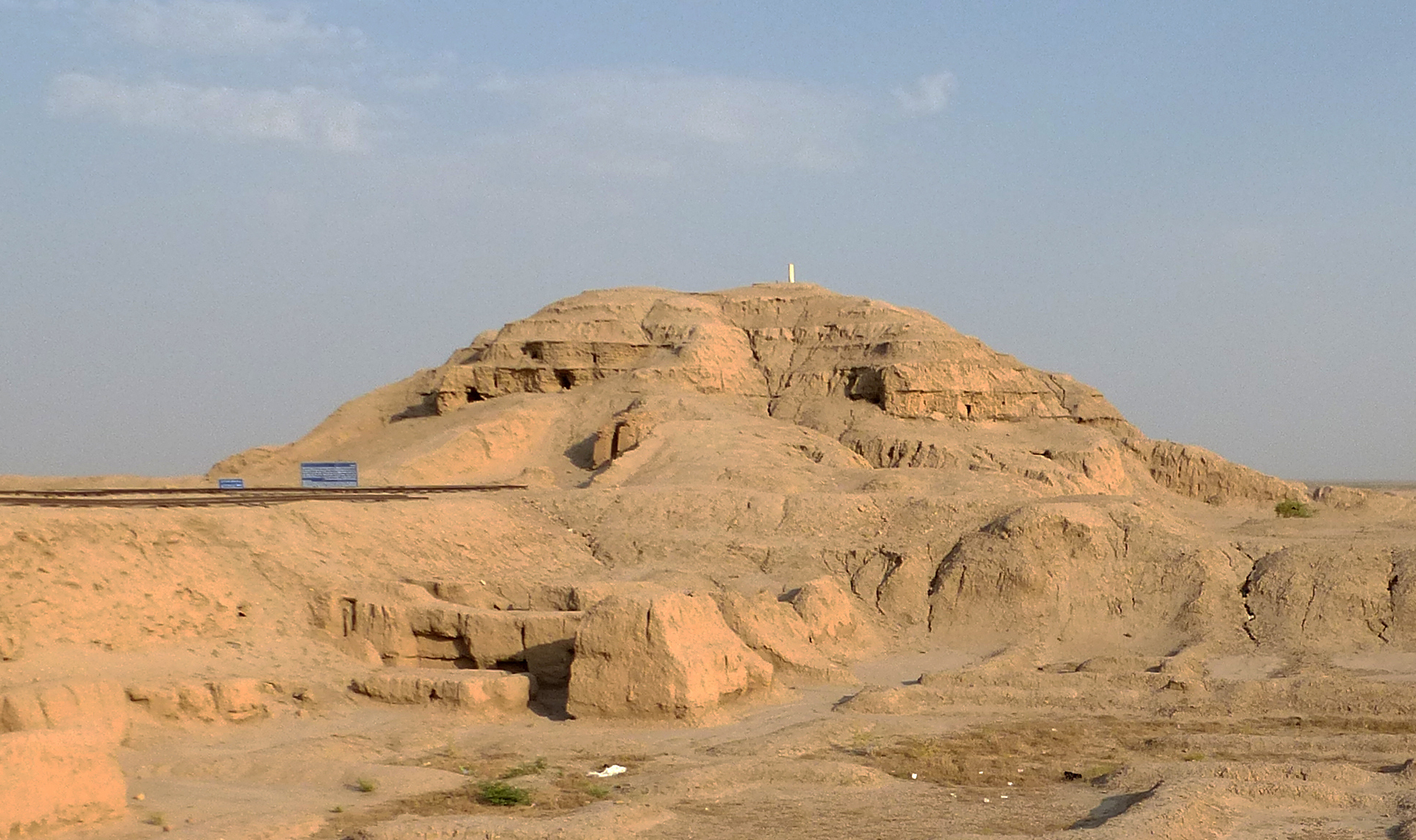
The Anu Ziggurat at Uruk. V. Gordon Childe regarded large public buildings as one of the defining features of the earliest cities.

By the end of the fourth millennium B.C., the emergence of the city of Uruk in Southern Mesopotamia reflected the social, cultural and political developments of proto-cities in the region during prior centuries. The city can be viewed as "the culmination of a series of increasingly successful experiments in settlement nucleation". Extremely large in scale (250 ha, twice the size of Tell Brak), Uruk was a centre of religious and political power, with large, well-decorated households and temples indicating a political and religious elite. As the most prominent of the early Mesopotamian cities, Uruk has yielded the earliest written documents (c. 3300 BC) and also the largest area of public buildings from the fourth millennium B.C., making it among the most significant of the early settlements that archeologists classify as cities.

The rise of urban settlements such as Uruk is often attributed to a "revolution" in social relations where - among other factors - the complex division of labour and the production of an agricultural surplus resulted in the development of social classes and ultimately, the centralisation of power around key institutions such as a ruler or other elements of government. In the first cities and states, this shifted societal relations from being based on kinship to being based on residence or class. Monumental architecture - attributed to the state - served as a symbol of political power, and may have also served to bind commoners emotionally to their city and to their ruler through the act of construction. As opposed to the popular view of the use of slave labour to construct ancient monuments, much of the labour was provided by free commoners as part of their tax requirements.

An alternative explanation of the urbanisation process suggests that changes in social relations may not have been as revolutionary in the earliest cities, where kinship may not have been replaced, but rather redefined to incorporate entire settlements and cities. The temples and palaces of the Mesopotamian city-states were run like households, using household terminologies such as "father", "son" and "servant". Houses in the village settlements of the fifth millennium B.C. Ubaid Period in Mesopotamia shared the same layout with temples both in the proto-urban settlement at Tell Brak and in the city of Uruk in the fourth millennium B.C; a common resident of Uruk would still be able to recognise a temple as a house, albeit different in scale and grandeur. Thus, through the course of the fourth millennium B.C., households might have been replaced not by the state, but rather by a metaphorical household that spanned an entire city rather than just an immediate family. The formation of the first cities may have been somewhat accidental if ambitious household heads trying to expand their social connections unintentionally grew their settlement by attracting new followers, even if they originally aimed to sustain and expand their own household.

== Controversy ==
The precise definition of what constitutes a proto-urban, urban or rural settlement has been a source of ambiguity and debate. As noted by V. Gordon Childe, "The concept of ‘city’ is notoriously hard to define". Childe’s 1950 concept of the “Urban Revolution” remains the prevailing framework for understanding the origins of cities, and lists ten criteria which differentiate Neolithic villages from the first "proper" cities. Among other features, the most enduring of Childe’s criteria include: a large and dense settlement population, the specialisation of labour, the concentration of an agricultural surplus by a centralised authority, the creation of social classes, and the centralisation of political power away from families and households.

Many of Childe’s criteria are still widely recognised as key milestones in the development of early complex societies, and his basic model can still be discerned within most modern accounts of the development of the earliest cities. More modern archaeological studies discuss the "origin of states", "primary state formation" or "archaic states" as opposed to any "Urban Revolution", and it is noted that "Childe's concept of the Urban Revolution was about the transition to complex, state level societies, and not primarily about urbanism or cities per se".

Childe's enduring influence in defining urban settlements has been frequently called into question, as his description features "nothing about the form or aesthetics of the City, or any particular city", rather, it "combined urbanism and the state in a single sequence and permitted the uncritical evaluation of this particular association". Another criticism of the Childean approach has been its reliance on a Eurocentric framework with questionable validity on a global scale, ignoring site and cultural-specific details and ultimately constituting a "check-list approach". Alternative, more flexible methods of differentiating a city from other types of sites have been less effective at differentiating between different site types, such as between urban, proto-urban or pre-urban. Thus, the precise classification of early urban phenomena is often ambiguous and subject to debate.

== See also ==
- List of Neolithic settlements
- Aşıklı Höyük
- Bhirrana
- Çatalhöyük
- Göbekli Tepe
- Jiahu
- Lepenski Vir
- Mehrgarh
- Sesklo
- Sarazm
- Tell es-Sultan
