= Ein es-Sultan camp =

Village and refugee camp near Jericho, West Bank, State of Palestine

ʿEin/ʿAin es-Sulṭān
- Place

Arabic transcription(s)
  - Arabic: مخيّم عين سلطان
  - Latin: Ayn al-Sulṭān (official)
- Location of ʿEin es Sultan/ʿAin as-Sulṭān within Palestine
- Coordinates: 31°52′40.24″N 35°26′46.24″E
- State: State of Palestine
- Governorate: Jericho
- Founded: 1948

Area
  - Total: 0.87 km^{2} (0.34 sq mi)

Population (2017)
  - Total: 4,384
  - Density: 5,000/km^{2} (13,000/sq mi)
- (including non-refugees)
- Name meaning: Sultan's Spring

ʿEin es-Sulṭān camp (Arabic: عين سلطان, romanized: ʿAin Sulṭān, lit. 'Sultan's spring'), or ʿEin Sultan camp, is a refugee camp in the Jericho Governorate of the State of Palestine, in the Jordan Valley, in the eastern West Bank. The village is located adjacent to the Ein es-Sultan or Elisha Spring, for which it is named, and the archaeological site of Tell es-Sultan, 1 kilometer north-west of the city of Jericho.

ʿEin es-Sulṭān had a population of over 4,384 inhabitants in 2017. In 1997, refugees constituted 81% of the population.

== History ==
ʿEin es-Sulṭān or ʿAin as-Sulṭān camp was established in 1948, on 870 dunums of arid land below the Mount of Temptation. Just before the 1967 Arab-Israeli conflict, the camp had accommodated some 20,000 refugees. During the hostilities the majority of the refugees fled across the Jordan River to Jordan. On 13 November 1985, following an agreement with UNRWA, the Israeli authorities began a program of demolishing unused houses. At the time the camp’s population was 600. In 1987 the authorities tried to expel as many of the refugees as they could. The US reports state that the refugees were suffering from "deteriorating economic circumstances".

Today, ʿEin Sulṭān has a small population of only 1,732 registered refugees. Some non-refugees have moved onto the camp's lands and built illegal homes as there is over-crowding and Israel authorities controls the issuing of building permits.

== Water ==
Water scarcity is a major problem in this arid area, especially during the summer. The springs Ayn as-Sultan, Ayn an-Nuway'mia and Ayn ad-Duyuk were utilised during Roman rule for irrigation to cultivate the land. After 1975 the water from the spring Ain as-Sultan was collected in four small basins. UNRWA supplies Ein Sultan with water by pumping it from a nearby spring. The out fall of the spring is close to Tell el-Sultan, the site of ancient Jericho. During the summer months, water shortages in the camp cause tremendous hardship for the refugees. However, the Israeli water company Mekorot has become the main supplier of water to the camp after Israel took control of water sources.

Following the signing of the 1994 Gaza–Jericho Agreement and Israeli army redeployment, the camp came under the control of the Palestinian National Authority.

In 2002, two stories were added to Ein Sultan School, including a new library, a multi-purpose room, an additional three classrooms and a computer lab.

== Notable people ==
- Nasr Abdel Aziz Eleyan
