= Tower of Jericho =

Ancient stone structure in Palestine

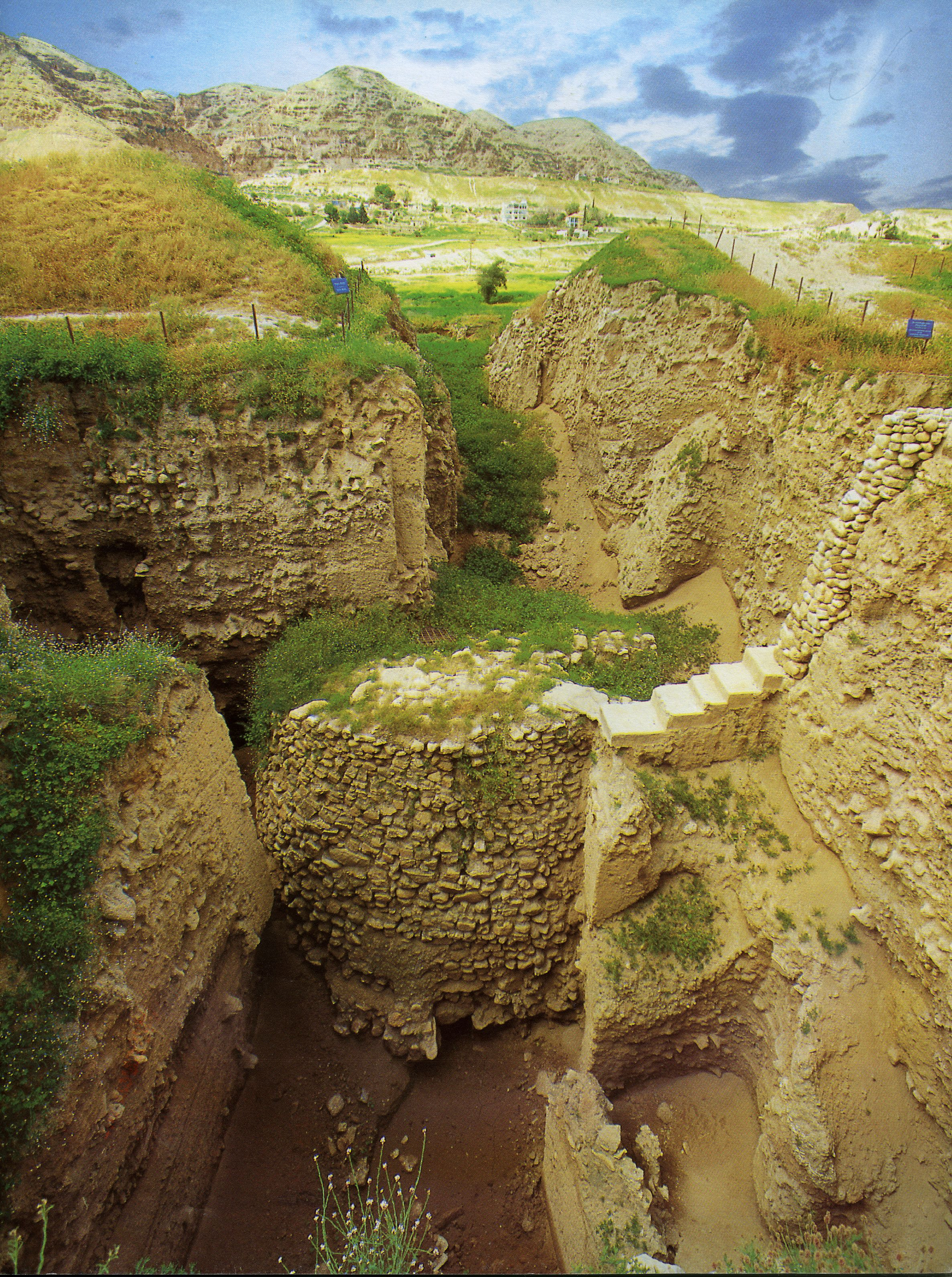
- Tower of Jericho

- Location within State of Palestine
- 31.872041°N 35.443981°E
- Type: Tower
- Periods: PPNA
- Cultures: Sultanian
- Region: West Bank, Palestine

History
- Built: c. 8000 BC; c. 10026 years ago

Site notes
- Height: 8.5 m (27.9 ft)
- Excavation dates: 1952–1958
- Archaeologists: John Garstang, Kathleen Kenyon, Roy Liran, and Ran Barkai
- Condition: Ruins

The Tower of Jericho (Arabic: برج أريحا) is an 8.5-metre-tall (28 ft) stone structure built in the Pre-Pottery Neolithic A period around 8000 BC. It is part of Tell es-Sultan, a UNESCO World Heritage Site in Palestine, in the city of Jericho, consisting of the remains of the oldest fortified city in the world. The Tower of Jericho has been described as one of the world's oldest towers, one of the world's oldest stone buildings, and one of the oldest works of monumental architecture. The archaeologist Kathleen Kenyon discovered the tower in the 1950s and excavated it.

== Discovery ==
The ancient wall of Jericho was discovered by John Garstang during the excavations of 1930 to 1936, which he suggested were those described in the Book of Joshua in the Bible and dated to around 1400 BC. Kathleen Kenyon discovered the tower built against the wall inside the town during excavations between 1952 and 1958. Kenyon provided evidence that both constructions dated to much earlier, to the Neolithic, the most recent era of the Stone Age, and were part of an early proto-city. The tower highlights the importance of Jericho for the understanding of settlement patterns in the Sultanian period in the Southern Levant.

== Structure ==
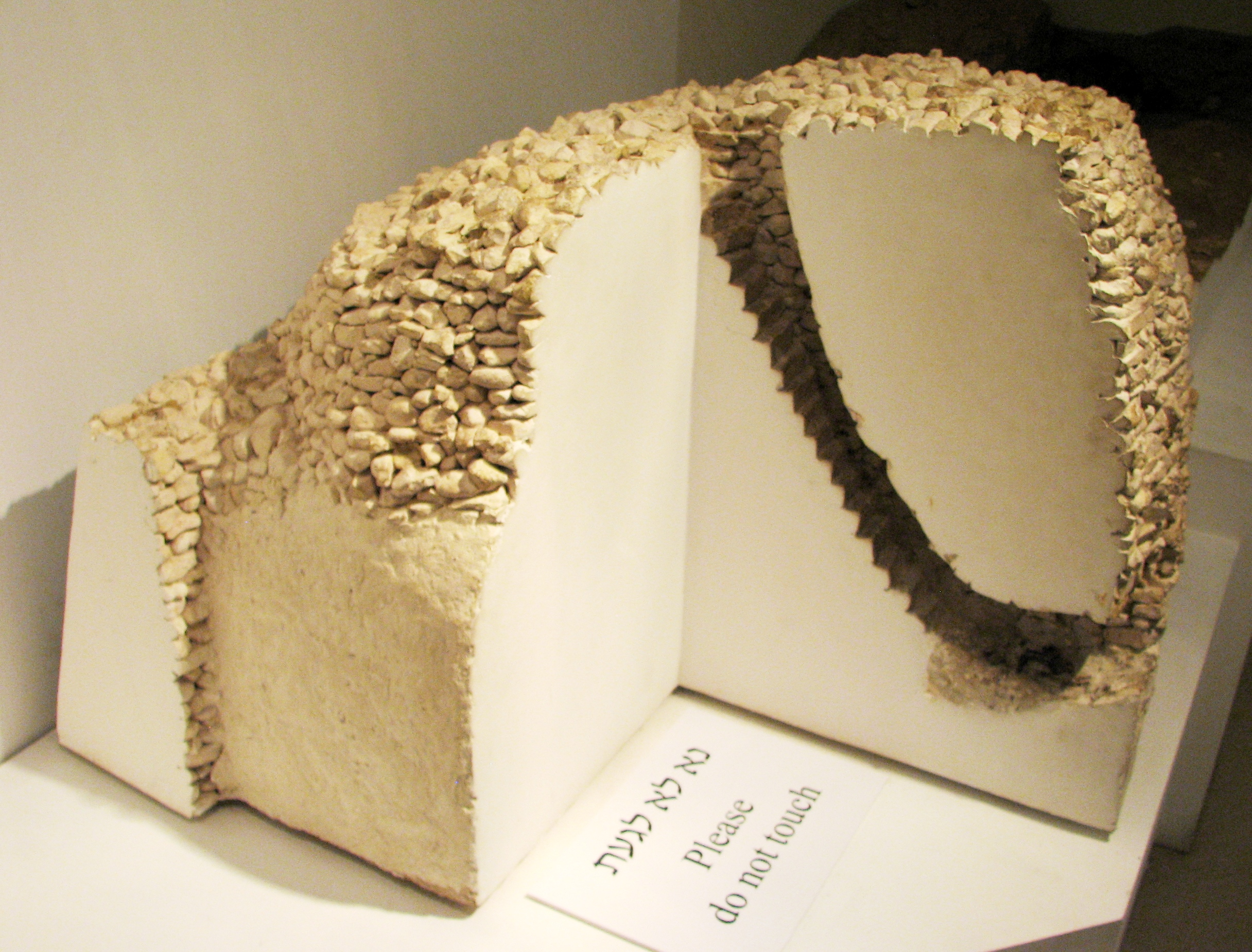
The cross-section model of the tower, showing the staircase

The tower was constructed using undressed stones, with an internal staircase of twenty-two steps. Conical in shape, the tower is almost 9 metres (30 ft) in diameter at the base, decreasing to 7 metres (23 ft) at the top with walls approximately 1.5 metres (4.9 ft) thick. The construction of the tower is estimated to have taken 11,000 working days.

== Purpose ==
Studies by Ran Barkai and Roy Liran from Tel Aviv University published in 2011 have suggested astronomical and social purposes in the construction of the tower. Showing an early example of archaeoastronomy, they used computer modelling to determine that the shadow of nearby mountains first hit the tower on the sunset of the summer solstice and then spread across the entire town. Noting that there were no known invasions of the area at the time of construction, the defensive purpose of the tower, wall and ditch at Jericho has been brought into question. No burials were found and suggestions of it being a tomb have been dismissed.

Discussing in The Jerusalem Post, Barkai argued that the structure was used to create awe and inspiration to convince people into a harder way of life with the development of agriculture and social hierarchies. He concluded: "We believe this tower was one of the mechanisms to motivate people to take part in a communal lifestyle."

== See also ==
- List of megalithic sites

Records
Preceded by Tell Qaramel	World's tallest structure c. 8000 BC – c. 4000 BC; 8.5 m	Succeeded by Anu ziggurat
