= Lorenzo Nigro =

Italian archaeologist and novelist

Lorenzo Nigro (born 1967) is an Italian field archaeologist and a professor of archaeology at Sapienza University of Rome. His studies and excavations are focused on ancient societies in the Levant and Mediterranean.

== Career ==
Lorenzo Nigro is the director of the Italian journal Vicino Oriente. He previously served as director of the Museum of the Near East, Egypt and the Mediterranean at Sapienza University and curator of the Gregorian Egyptian Museum.

=== Tell es-Sultan ===
Beginning in 1997, Nigro and fellow archaeologists Hamdan Taha and Nicolò Marchetti supervised an Italian-Palestinian excavations at Tell es-Sultan (ancient Jericho, Palestine). His team discovered patterns of crop cultivation, canal construction, and animal husbandry in the tell. The Tell-es Sultan conservation project, implemented by UNESCO, the Palestinian Ministry of Tourism and Antiquities, and Sapienza University, hosted an international symposium in February 2023, where Nigro spoke about strategies used to preserve the ancient site during excavation. On 17 September 2023, the World Heritage Committee inscribed Ancient Jericho/Tell es-Sultan as a UNESCO World Heritage Site in the State of Palestine.

=== Motya ===
For twenty years, Nigro led archaeological digs on the southern part of island of Motya off the coast of Sicily, in collaboration with the Regional Superintendency of Trapani. His excavations of the ancient Phoenician settlement on the island unearthed "early temples to Baal and Astarte" and a nearby "cult building", surrounded by a wall dated to 550 BCE. His expedition uncovered "offerings and architectural elements" in these temples, showing that "water and the stars" were important ritual elements of Phoenician religious worship. In 2013, Nigro and his team drained the kothon on the island and discovered evidence that the lagoon was actually used for religious rituals, rather than serving a dry dock as previously believed. In an interview for Archaeology magazine, Nigro explained that the area was part of a "sacred pool" centered on Baal, with a cult statue in the middle "as a central point and a visual attraction".

On the island, Nigro and his team discovered "Egyptian-like artifacts" such as scarabs, as well as evidence that the Phoenicians adopted customs and traditions from the Elymians. They also found a white terracotta face of a woman with red hair, representing the goddess Astarte.

=== Bethlehem ===
In 2015, Nigro led a joint Italian-Palestinian team to excavate a site near Bethlehem in the West Bank, after a construction crew found signs of a burial ground. Their archaeological expedition uncovered Canaanite artifacts and an ancient necropolis dating between 2200 BCE – 650 BCE. The site is now called Khalet al-Jam'a.

=== Khirbet al-Batrawy ===
Beginning in December 2004, a Sapienza University archaeological expedition directed by Nigro uncovered the previously unknown city of Khirbet al-Batrawy in Jordan. The site has a royal palace with substantive fortifications and towers, which Nigro and his team have called "the Palace of Copper Axes", based on the five copper axes discovered there. They have also found other artifacts like jewels, ceremonial vessels, and several potter's wheels.

== Awards ==
- 2026–2027 – Albright Institute of Archaeological Research Fellowship in Jerusalem
- 2026 – Premio Pasquale Rotondi ai Salvatori dell'Arte (transl. Pasquale Rotondi Award for Saviours of Art) for contributions to the Tell es-Sultan site's World Heritage inscription
- 2021 – Antonino Di Vita Award
- 2020 – Solunto International Award
- 2019 – Silvia Dell'Orso Award

== Publications ==
=== Articles and chapters ===
- with Marchetti, "Cultic Activities in the Sacred Area of Ishtar at Ebla during the Old Syrian Period: The Favissae F.5327 and F.5238", Journal of Cuneiform Studies, 1997, 1-44
- "The two steles of Sargon: iconology and visual propaganda at the beginning of royal Akkadian relief", Iraq, 1988, 85-102
- with Zalloua et al. "Ancient DNA of Phoenician remains indicates discontinuity in the settlement history of Ibiza", Scientific Reports, 2018.
- with Calcagnile, Yasin, Gallo, Quarta. "Jericho and the Chronology of Palestine in the Early Bronze Age: A Radiometric Re-Assessment", Radiocarbon, 2019, 211-241
- "The Italian-Palestinian Expedition to Tell es-Sultan, Ancient Jericho (1997-2015): Archaeology and Valorisation of Material and Immaterial Heritage" in (eds. Sparks, Finlayson, Wagemakers, Briffa) 'Digging Up Jericho: Past, Present, and Future,' Oxford: Archaeopress, 2020, pp. 175-214
- "The sacred pool of Ba'al: a reinterpretation of the ‘Kothon’ at Motya", Antiquity, 2022, pp. 354-371

=== Books ===
- Tell es-Sultan/Jericho in the Context of the Jordan Valley: Site Management, Conservation and Sustainable Development. 2006.
- Tell Es-Sultan/Jericho in the Early Bronze II (3000-2700 BC): The Rise of an Early Palestinian City : a Synthesis of the Results of Four Archaeological Expeditions. 2010.
