= Carl Watzinger =

German archaeologist

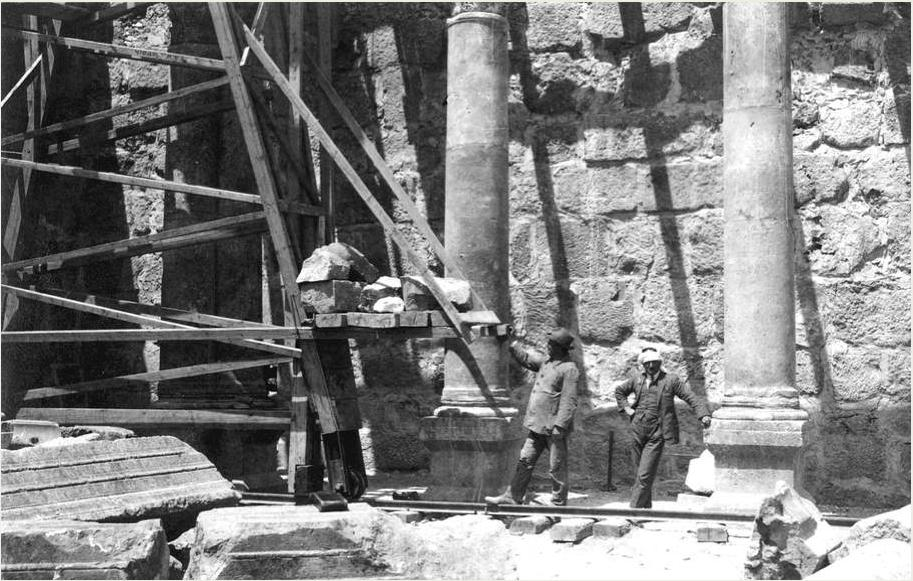
1905 - H. Kohl and C. Watzinger working in the synagogue in Capernaum

Carl Watzinger (9 June 1877 in Darmstadt – 8 December 1948 in Tübingen) was a German archaeologist, who with Ernst Sellin, worked on uncovering the site of the ancient city of Jericho (1907–09), and earlier, with Heinrich Kohl (1877–1914), conducted excavations at Capernaum (1905).

== Academic career ==
Watzinger studied philosophy, archaeology and history at the Universities of Heidelberg, Berlin and Bonn, obtaining his doctorate in 1899 with the thesis "Studien zur unteritalischen Vasenmalerei". Later on, he worked as an assistant at the Royal Museum in Berlin. In 1904, he earned his habilitation in Berlin with a dissertation involving Greek wood sarcophagi from the time of Alexander the Great, titled Griechische Holzsarkophage aus der Zeit Alexanders des Großen.

In 1905 he became an associate professor of classical archaeology at the University of Rostock, where he specialized in studies of Hellenistic art and the archaeology of Palestine and Syria. He was later a full professor at the Universities of Giessen (1909–1916) and Tübingen (1916–1947).

From 1911 to 1947, he was a member of the Central Board of the German Archaeological Institute (Berlin). He was also a member of the Austrian Archaeological Institute (Vienna) and an honorary member of the Griechischen Archäologischen Gesellschaft (Greek Archaeological Society).

== Selected works ==
- Die Ergebnisse der Ausgrabungen, (with Ernst Sellin) Leipzig 1913. (Reprint Osnabrück 1973) Jericho – The results of the excavations.
- Antike Synagogen in Galiläa (with Heinrich Kohl) Leipzig 1916. (Reprint Jerusalem in 1973 and Osnabrück 1975) – Ancient synagogues in Galilee.
- Damaskus, die antike Stadt, Berlin, Leipzig, 1921 – Damascus, the ancient city.
- Damaskus, die islamische Stadt, Berlin 1924 – Damascus, the Islamic city.
