= Ernst Sellin =

German Protestant theologian

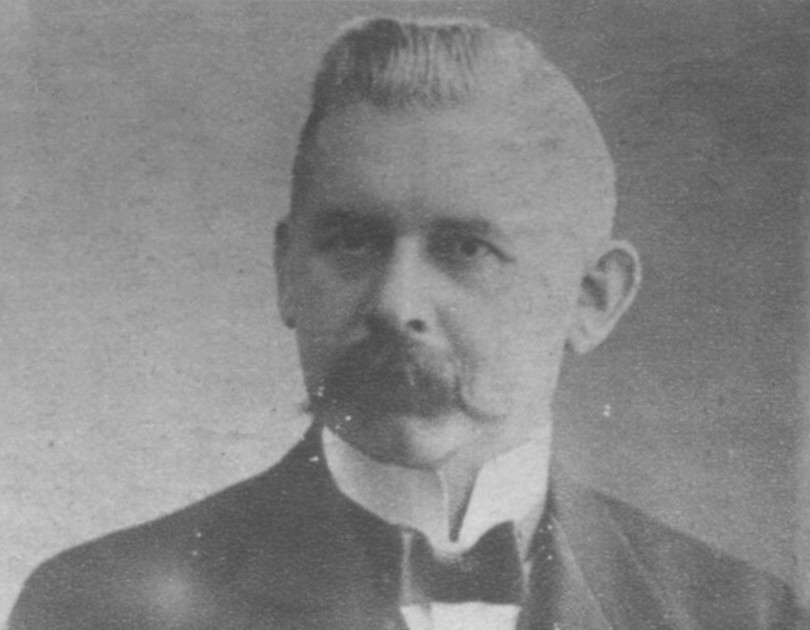
Ernst Sellin

Ernst Sellin (26 May 1867 in Alt Schwerin – 1 January 1946 in Epichnellen bei Eisenach) was a German Protestant theologian.

Sellin studied theology and oriental languages. During 1897–1908 he taught at the Protestant faculty of theology in Vienna, during 1908–1913 at the University of Rostock, during 1913–1921 in Kiel and in 1921–1935 in Berlin.

Sellin was Old Testament scholar and a pioneer of application of archaeology into Biblical sciences. With his excavations in Ta'anakh he initiated and led one of the first excavations of a ″tell″ in Palestine/Land of Israel (there he also found cuneiform tablets from about the 15th cent. BCE, that were edited by Bedřich Hrozný); together with others he also conducted excavations in Jericho and Shechem.

Sellin's description of the two places of Jericho, one being the old city mentioned in the Book of Joshua and other passages, and the other the new Roman city, allows a possible explanation of an alleged contradiction between the gospels of Mark and Luke, i.e. whether Jesus healed a blind man on the way to or after arriving in the city of Jericho (Luke 18:35 and Mark 10:46). As the two "Jerichos" were about a mile apart, one may understand that Jesus left Luke's Jericho and was arriving at Mark's Jericho when this took place.

Sellin's main topic was the study of the Old Testament in historical, religio-historical and theological perspectives. Probably his most successful book was his Einleitung in das Alte Testament from 1910, which was updated and expanded by himself (until 7th. ed. 1935) and later on by others until 12th. ed. 1979 (Engl. translation: Introduction to the OT, 1923). He also tried to apply the results from archaeology to the history of ancient Israel. In his exegesis of the book of (Deutero-)Isaiah he related the suffering servant to Moses and concluded that Moses would have died as martyr by his own people. This idea in turn was taken up by Sigmund Freud.

== Selected works ==
- Beiträge zur Israelitischen und Jüdischen Religionsgeschichte. Leipzig 1896, volume 2 1897. – Contribution to Israelite and Jewish religious history.
- Studien zur Entstehungsgeschichte der jüdischen Gemeinde nach dem babylonischen Exil. 2 volumes, Leipzig 1901.
- Tell Ta‘annek. Bericht über eine mit Unterstützung der kaiserlichen Akademie der Wissenschaften und des k. k. Ministeriums für Kultus und Unterricht unternommene Ausgrabung in Palästina, Wien 1904; reprint in: S. Kreuzer (ed.), Taanach / Tell Ta‛annek. 100 Jahre Forschungen zur Archäologie, zur Geschichte, zu den Fundobjekten und zu den Keilschrifttexten, Wiener Alttestamentliche Studien 5, Wien-Frankfurt am Main 2006, 131–270. ISBN 978-3631551042
- Eine Nachlese auf dem Tell Ta‘annek in Palästina, Wien 1906; reprint in: S. Kreuzer (Hg.), Taanach / Tell Ta‛annek. 100 Jahre Forschungen zur Archäologie, zur Geschichte, zu den Fundobjekten und zu den Keilschrifttexten, WAS 5, Wien-Frankfurt am Main 2006, 271–317. ISBN 978-3631551042
- Die biblische Urgeschichte, 1905 – Biblical prehistory.
- Das Rätsel des deuterojesajanischen Buches. Leipzig 1908, – The mystery of Deuterojesaja.
- Einleitung in das Alte Testament, Leipzig 1910, 12th edition 1979. – Introduction to the Old Testament.
- Der alttestamentliche Prophetismus : drei Studien, 1912 – The Old Testament prophets, three studies.
- Jericho, 1913 (with Carl Watzinger).
- Gilgal; ein Beitrag zur Geschichte der Einwanderung Israels in Palästina, 1917 – Gilgal; a contribution to the history on the immigration of Israel in Palestine.
- *Introduction to the Old Testament", 1923, (translated by W. Montgomery, with an introduction and a bibliography by Professor A. S. Peake).
- Theologie des Alten Testaments, 1933 – Theology of the Old Testament.

== Bibliography ==
- Georg Sauer (1995). "Sellin, Ernst Franz Max". In Bautz, Traugott (ed.). Biographisch-Bibliographisches Kirchenlexikon (BBKL) (in German). Vol. 9. Herzberg: Bautz. cols. 1370–1372. ISBN 3-88309-058-1.
- Ulrich Palmer: Ernst Sellin - Alttestamentler und Archäologe. Beiträge zur Erforschung des Alten Testaments und des Antiken Judentums, Lang, Frankfurt am Main u.a. 2012. ISBN 978-3-631-61078-7
- Siegfried Kreuzer: Palästinaarchäologie aus Österreich: Ernst Sellins Ausgrabungen auf dem Tell Ta’annek in Israel (1902-1904); in: Zeitenwechsel und Beständigkeit. Beiträge zur Geschichte der Evangelisch-theologischen Fakultät in Wien 1821 - 1996, Schriftenreihe des Universitätsarchivs, Bd. 10, Wien 1997, 257–276. ISBN 978-3851143140
- Siegfried Kreuzer: Die Ausgrabungen des Wiener Alttestamentlers Ernst Sellin in Tell Ta'annek (Taanach) von 1902 bis 1904 im Horizont der zeitgenössischen Forschung; in: Protokolle zur Bibel 13 (2004), 107–130.
- Siegfried Kreuzer: Ernst Sellin und Gottlieb Schumacher, in: Charlotte Trümpler (Hg.), Das große Spiel. Archäologie und Politik zur Zeit des Kolonialismus (1860-1940), Essen 2008, 136–145.655f. ISBN 9783832190637
- Siegfried Kreuzer: Das Verständnis des biblischen Monotheismus bei Ernst Sellin, Wiener Jahrbuch für Theologie 2012 (Wien 2013), 175–187. ISBN 978-3-8471-0065-2
- Hermann Michael Niemann, Ernst Sellin: Powerful in his time. A sketch of the life and work of an Old Testament scholar and pioneer in biblical archaeology from Mecklenburg, in: Palmer, Ulrich: Ernst Sellin - Alttestamentler und Archäologe, BEATAJ 58, Frankfurt am Main [u.a.]: Lang 2011, 131 - 163 (see above).
