= Tell Qaramel =

Archaeological site in Syria

- Archeologic Site of Tell Qaramel
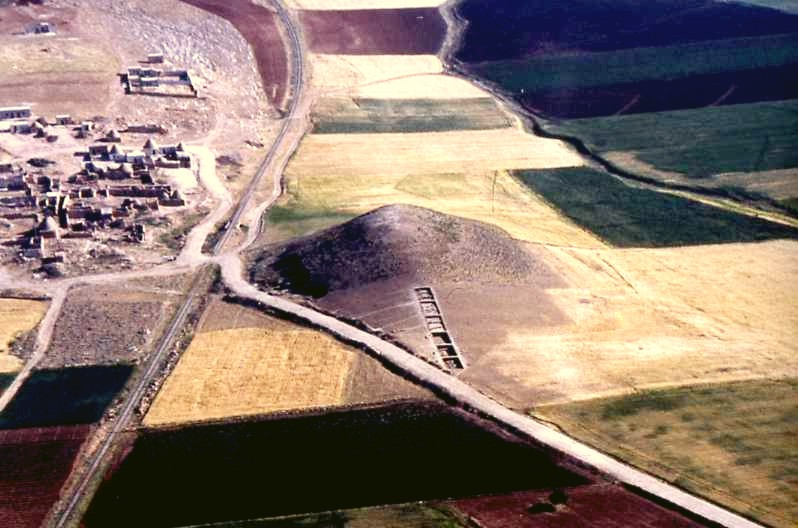
- Aerial view of Tell Qaramel

- Location within Syria
- 36.3778°N 37.2751°E
- Type: settlement
- Periods: Neolithic
- Location: Aleppo Governorate, Syria

History
- Built: 10650 BC

Site notes
- Excavation dates: 1999—2011
- Archaeologists: Ryszard F. Mazurowski, Youssef Kanjou

Tell Qaramel (also Tel Qaramel or Tel al-Qaramel, Arabic: تل القرامل) is a tell, or archaeological mound, located in Aleppo Governorate, Syria, 25 km north of Aleppo in the Queiq river basin. The settlement has several circular stone towers dating back to the period between 10,650-9,650 BCE, making them the oldest such structures in the world.

== Archaeology ==
The site is located in a fertile river valley that has been an important trade route; a railway still runs between the present-day village and the tell, transecting the Neolithic site. The tell lies between the current village and the Quweiq river to the east, and its summit is measured at 444 m above sea level; the neolithic site extends to the south and lies about 20m lower. It covers a 190 by 160 meter area.

A survey in the late 1970s found evidence of settlement at the site from the Pre-Pottery Neolithic A period through to the Hellenistic period. The later phases of occupation are closely associated with the mound of the tell itself. The pre-pottery Neolithic phase however is associated with a wider area of about 3.5 hectares, extending to the south and south-west of the tell and covered by up to 2.5 m of later deposits through the Bronze Age and Iron Age. It is this area that has been the focus of detailed investigation since 1999 by a joint Polish-Syrian team led by Ryszard F. Mazurowski of Warsaw University and Youssef Kanjou from Aleppo Museum under the auspices of the Polish Centre of Mediterranean Archaeology. Thus far about six areas have been investigated and four excavated: only about 1.5% of the entire site (Mazurowski p. 18). After 2011 the excavations were suspended due to the civil war in Syria.

Before the excavations began, it was assumed that permanent sedentary settlements would occur only in combination with the first farming of cereals, and the first domestication and keeping of animals such as sheep and goats, marking the start of the Neolithic period, part of a transition between the proto-Neolithic and Pre-Pottery Neolithic A cultures. However the remains of the structures uncovered at Tell Qaramel appear to be older than this, giving the first evidence of permanent stone-built settlement. From the current C14 dates, the site predates Göbekli Tepe in Turkey.

=== Stratigraphy and chronology ===
The archeologists distinguish a preliminary epipaleolithic phase (Horizon 0) attested mostly by flint tools but no certain carbon samples. For the subsequent settlement they recognise 4 Early Aceramic Neolithic layers (Horizon 1 to 4) which according to radiocarbon dating have been partially overlapping (contemporary).

Cultural horizons and calibrated radiocarbon dates at Tell Qaramel
Horizon	Mean date 2σ (95.4%) probability	No. samples
H0	16890-10980 BC conv.	4?
H1	10898-9670 BC cal.	11
H2	10464-9246 BC cal.	11
H3	9817-8711 BC cal.	9
H4	9305-8783 BC cal.	1

The excavators find an unbroken development (in contrast to e.g. in Jericho in the southern Levant) so are skeptical about the common division in "Pre-Pottery Neolithic A" and "Pre-Pottery Neolithic B" phases, instead preferring "Early Aceramic Neolithic" for the proto-neolithic and PPNA, and "Late Aceramic Neolithic" for PPNB and PPNC.

The dating is not without problems. The archeologists rejected several samples because the radiocarbon dates were inconsistent with the stratigraphy, but also otherwise the very early dates at Tell Qaramel appear too old as compared to dating of similar cultural phases at other sites. Comparison of the laboratory in Gliwice, Poland (code Gd) that executed the C14 analyses, with other laboratories, showed differences in either direction.

=== Highlights ===
Particularly striking are the remains of a succession of five round stone structures which the excavators recognise as the remains of towers (Mazurowski et al. 2012 pp. 48..52). The lower, oldest one was about 6 m in diameter and appears to have had some communal function, having an elevated hearth at the center with two benches centered on it. The fourth phase was most massive, at about 7.5m in diameter with stone walls of about 2.25 m thick; it had no internal structure. It was damaged by fire and rebuilt, and may have been a defensive structure. The earliest phase has been carbon-dated to between the eleventh millennium and 9670 BC. This dating makes the structure roughly two millennia older than the stone tower found at Jericho, which was previously believed to be the oldest known tower structure in the world.

Among the ornaments found was a rather large (52×40×26 mm) polished copper nugget from Horizon 2 - one of the earliest finds of metal in an archeological site. As malachite (copper carbonate) has been excavated too in Tell Qaramel, the copper nugget may have been collected from the (as yet unidentified) malachite source. An attempt had been made to drill a hole through the copper like with other stone beads, but technology was not yet sufficiently advanced to process metal (Mazurowski 2012 p. 80; Plate 137A p. 280).

=== Mortuary practices ===
Remains of 34 individuals, from 23 graves, from the PPNA H3 period have been excavated, all adults: this may indicate that burial practice for infants and children was different, at another (as yet undiscovered) location or treated with less regard. Most bodies had their head removed, either by cutting shortly after death (as indicated by cut marks, and having the 1st vertebra remain with the skull), or after decay (leaving the vertebrae and lower mandible with the skeleton). This indicates a head cult, as is also attested in other pre-pottery Neolithic sites (notably Jericho, Tell Aswad, and Cayonu). While in some skulls teeth showed wear and caries, which is typical for a diet with carbohydrates from grain, others were in good condition, which may indicate a pre-Neolithic diet. Based on radiocarbon dating of 57 samples the skeleton date to 11,770–10,660 cal BP.

== See also ==
- Cities of the ancient Near East

Records
Preceded by unknown	World's tallest structure unknown - c. 8000 BCE --	Succeeded by Tower of Jericho
