= Turkish Film Commission =

Film commission in Türkiye

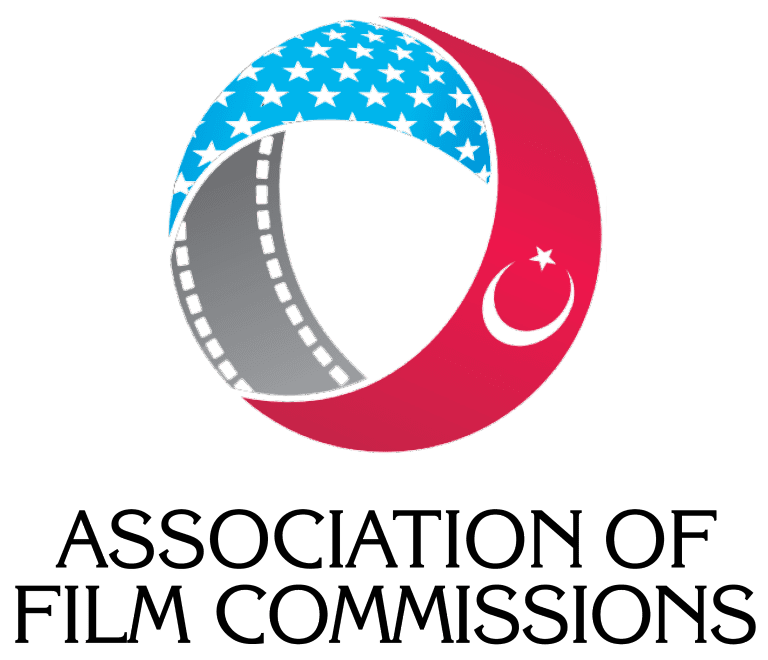
- Formation: 2012
- Founder: Sait Yardımcı
- Type: Film commission
- Headquarters: Istanbul, Turkey
- Chairman: Sait Yardımcı
- Website: turkishfilmcommission.org

The Turkish Film Commission is a private organization founded in 2012 by Sait Yardımcı to support film production in Turkey. The commission works with both Turkish and international productions, helping them navigate permits and find suitable filming locations across the country.

Since 2021, the organization has particularly focused on promoting lesser-known Turkish regions as filming destinations, with Cappadocia becoming a key area of interest.

== Services and operations ==
The commission assists productions through several key areas: coordinating filming permits with local and national authorities, providing location scouting recommendations, and facilitating access to historical sites and aerial filming opportunities. The organization also represents Turkey's film industry at international festivals and trade events to attract foreign productions.

By 2025, international media began reporting increased interest from foreign film studios in Turkish locations, with the commission playing a role in facilitating these connections.

== International productions ==
The commission has facilitated several notable international projects. Arte France filmed The Fabulous Story of Money at the ancient city of Sardis in Manisa, exploring the historical significance of the site where coins were first minted.

The History Channel chose eastern Turkey for filming a documentary about Noah's Ark, with production taking place in Ağrı and Doğubayazıt, areas traditionally associated with the biblical narrative.

Discovery Channel has worked with the commission on multiple projects in Turkey. These included documentaries shot in Pamukkale, known for its white limestone terraces, and a historical documentary in southeastern Turkey featuring the archaeological sites of Göbekli Tepe and Karahan Tepe.

== Leadership ==
Sait Yardımcı has chaired the commission since its founding in 2012. He has been quoted in national and international media regarding foreign productions and filming logistics in Turkey, and has appeared in coverage promoting Turkish locations such as Cappadocia for international film projects.
