= Urfa Man =

Neolithic Turkish statue

- Urfa man, in the Şanlıurfa Museum
- Material: Sandstone
- Size: c. 1.90 meters
- Created: c. 9000 BC
- Present location: Şanlıurfa Museum, Turkey

Location

The Urfa man, also known as the Balıklıgöl statue, is an ancient human shaped statue found during excavations in Balıklıgöl near Urfa, in the geographical area of Upper Mesopotamia, in the southeast of modern Turkey. It is dated c. 9000 BC to the period of the Pre-Pottery Neolithic, and was considered as "the oldest naturalistic life-sized sculpture of a human". It is considered as contemporaneous with the sites of Göbekli Tepe (Pre-Pottery Neolithic A/B) and Nevalı Çori (Pre-Pottery Neolithic B), and belongs to the Taş Tepeler tradition of monumental statues of men holding their erect phallus. The site of Yeni Mahalle, which originally contained the statue, was carbon dated to 8600 BCE.

== Discovery ==
The statue was found during construction work, and the exact location of the find has not been properly recorded, but it may have come from the nearby Pre-Pottery Neolithic A site of Urfa Yeni-Yol. This is not far from other known Pre-Pottery Neolithic A sites around Urfa: Göbekli Tepe (about 10 kilometers), Gürcütepe. It is reported that it was discovered in 1993 on Yeni Yol street in Balıklıgöl, at the same location where the Pre-Pottery Neolithic site of Yeni Mahalle was investigated from 1997.

The statue is approximately 1.90 meters tall. The eyes form deep holes, in which are set segments of black obsidian. It features a V-shaped collar or necklace. The hands are clasped in front, covering the genitals. The statue is thought to date to around 9000 BC, and is often claimed to be the oldest known statue in the world.

== Context ==
Before the Urfa Man, numerous small-sized statuettes are known from the Upper Paleolithic, such as the Löwenmensch figurine (c. 40,000 BC), the Venus of Dolní Věstonice (c. 30,000 BC), the Venus of Willendorf (c. 25,000 BC) or the realistic Venus of Brassempouy (c. 25,000 BC).

Slightly later than the Urfa Man, Pre-Pottery Neolithic C, anthropomorphic statues are known from the Levant, such as the 'Ain Ghazal Statues. In 2023, it was announced that excavations carried out at Karahan Tepe have turned up a similar human statue that dates back to around 9,400 BC.

== Gallery ==
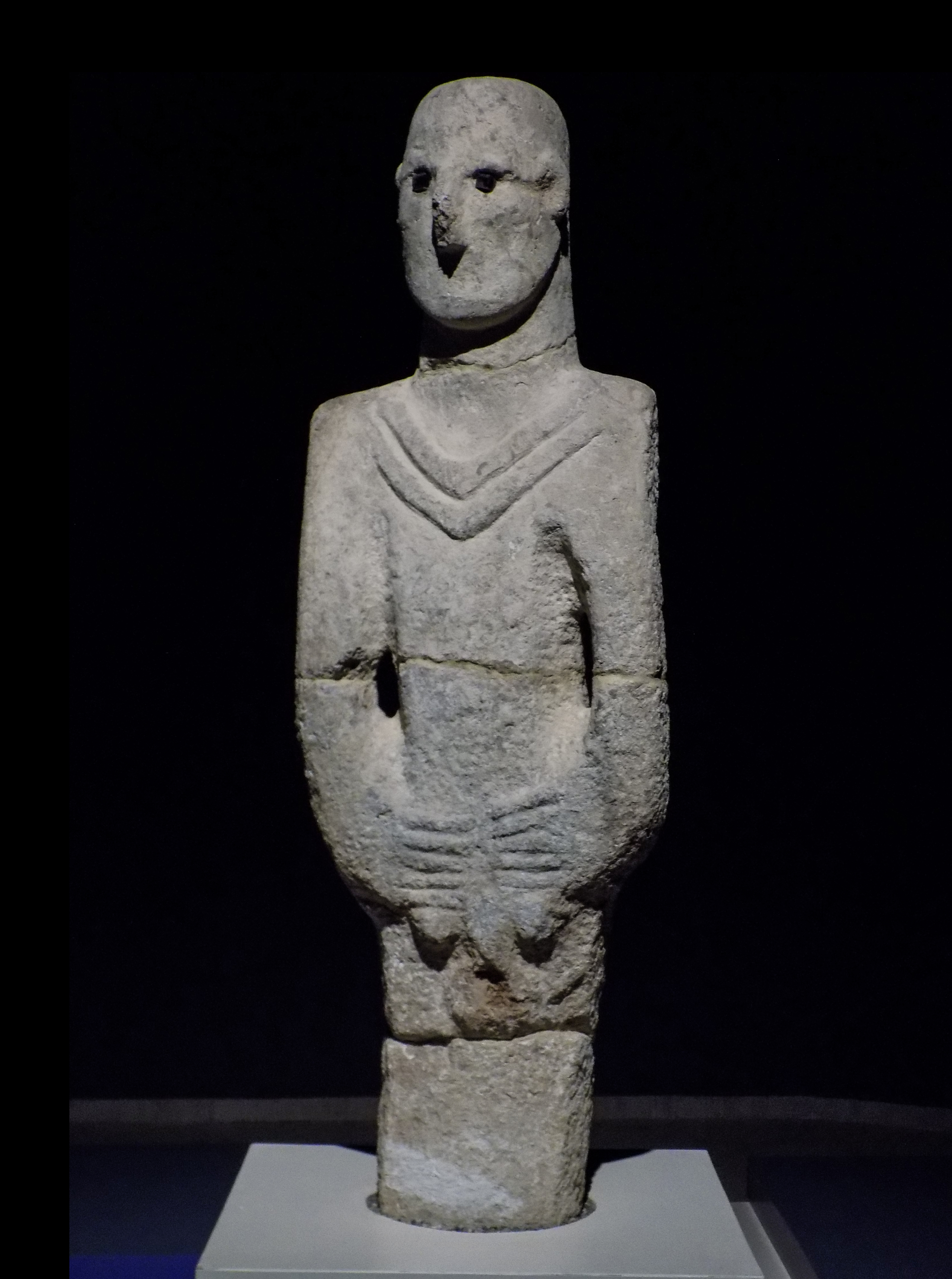
Another view of the statue

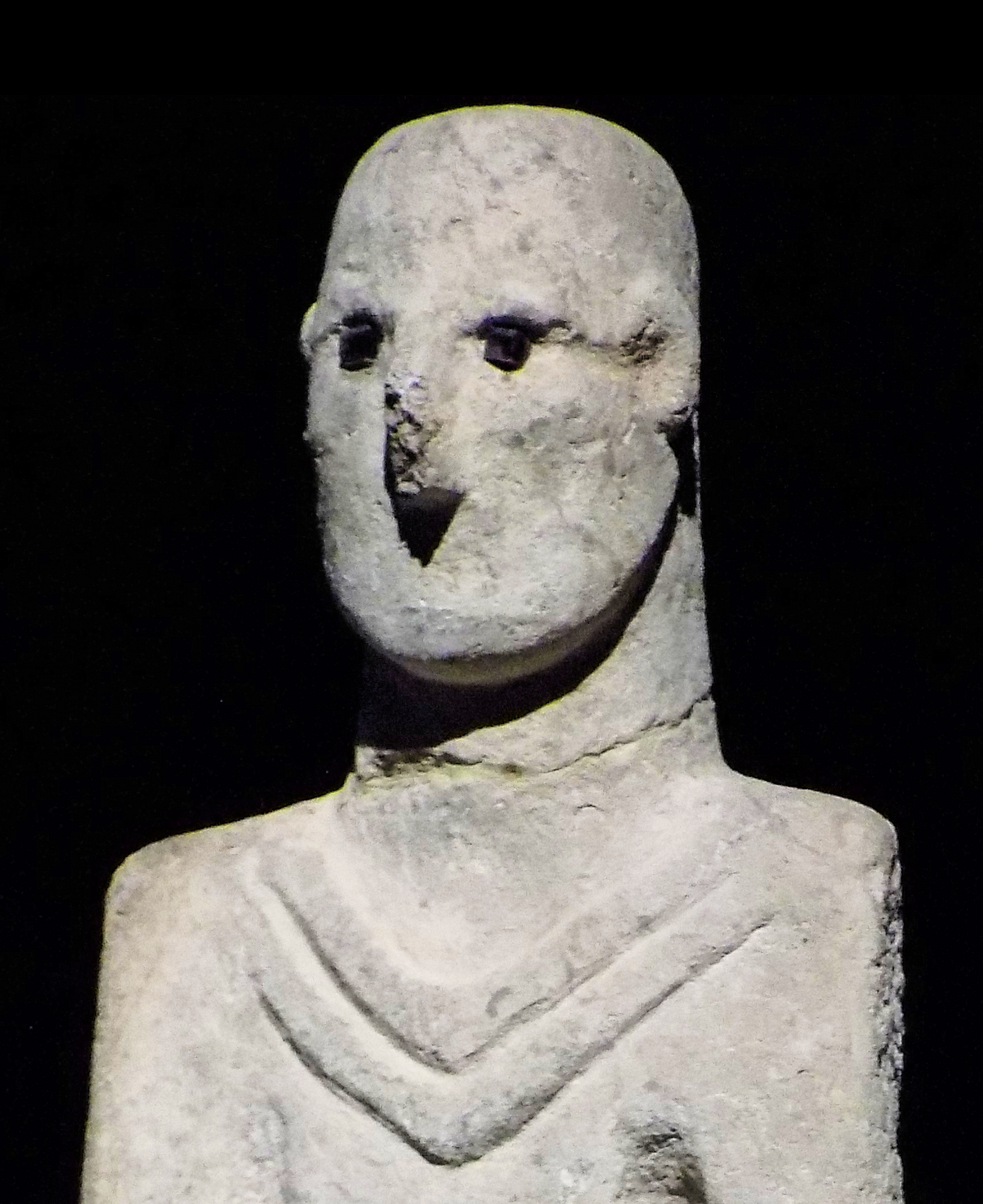
Urfa man portrait, with obsidian stones in the eye sockets

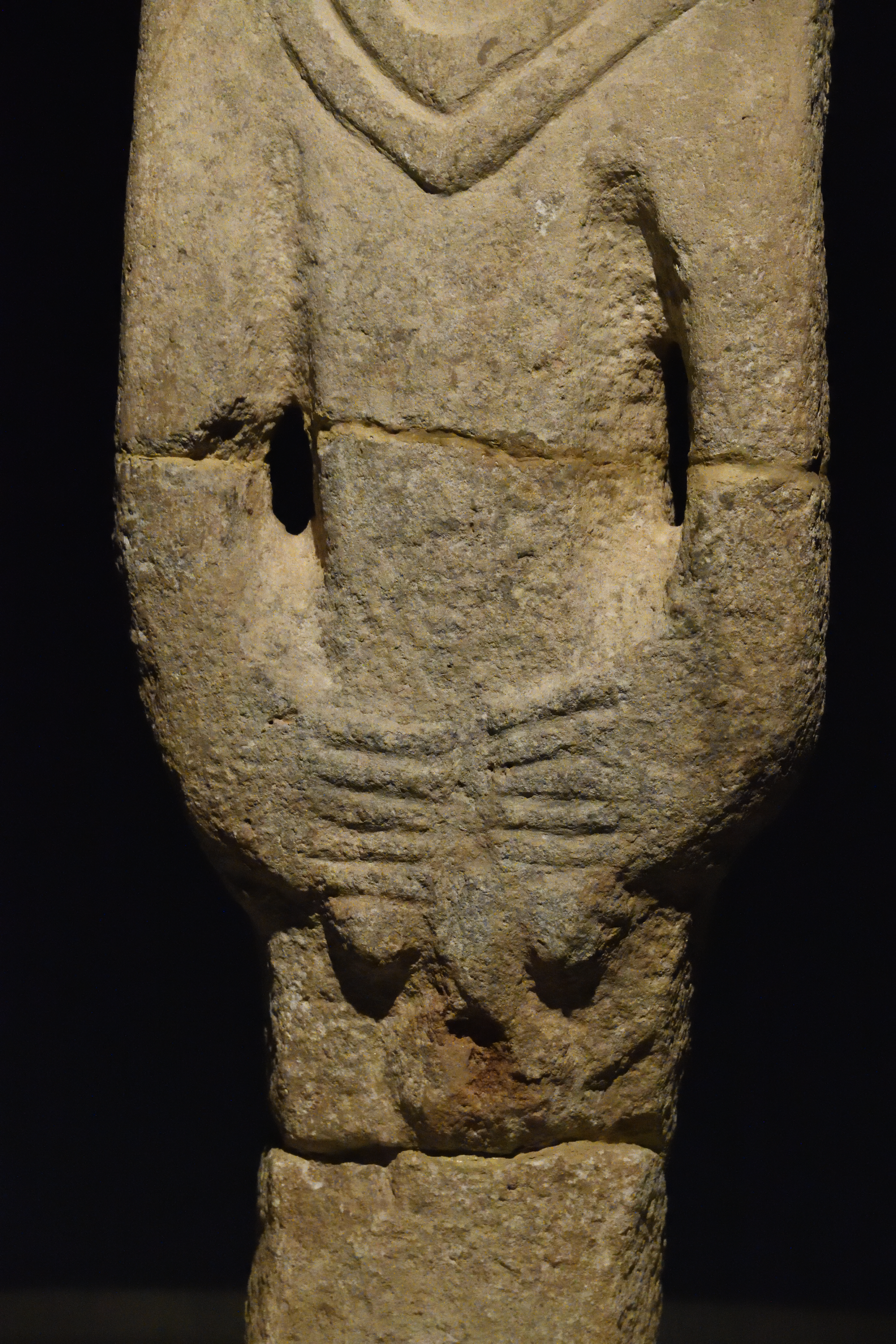
Urfa man detail

== See also ==
- Art of Mesopotamia
- Jericho Statue, from c. 9000 years ago, found in Tel Jericho
- 'Ain Ghazal Statues – Early Neolithic statues found in Jordan
- Shigir Idol – Oldest known wooden sculpture
