= Şanlıurfa Archaeology and Mosaic Museum =

Museum in Şanlıurfa, Turkey

- Şanlıurfa Arkeoloji ve Mozaik Müzesi
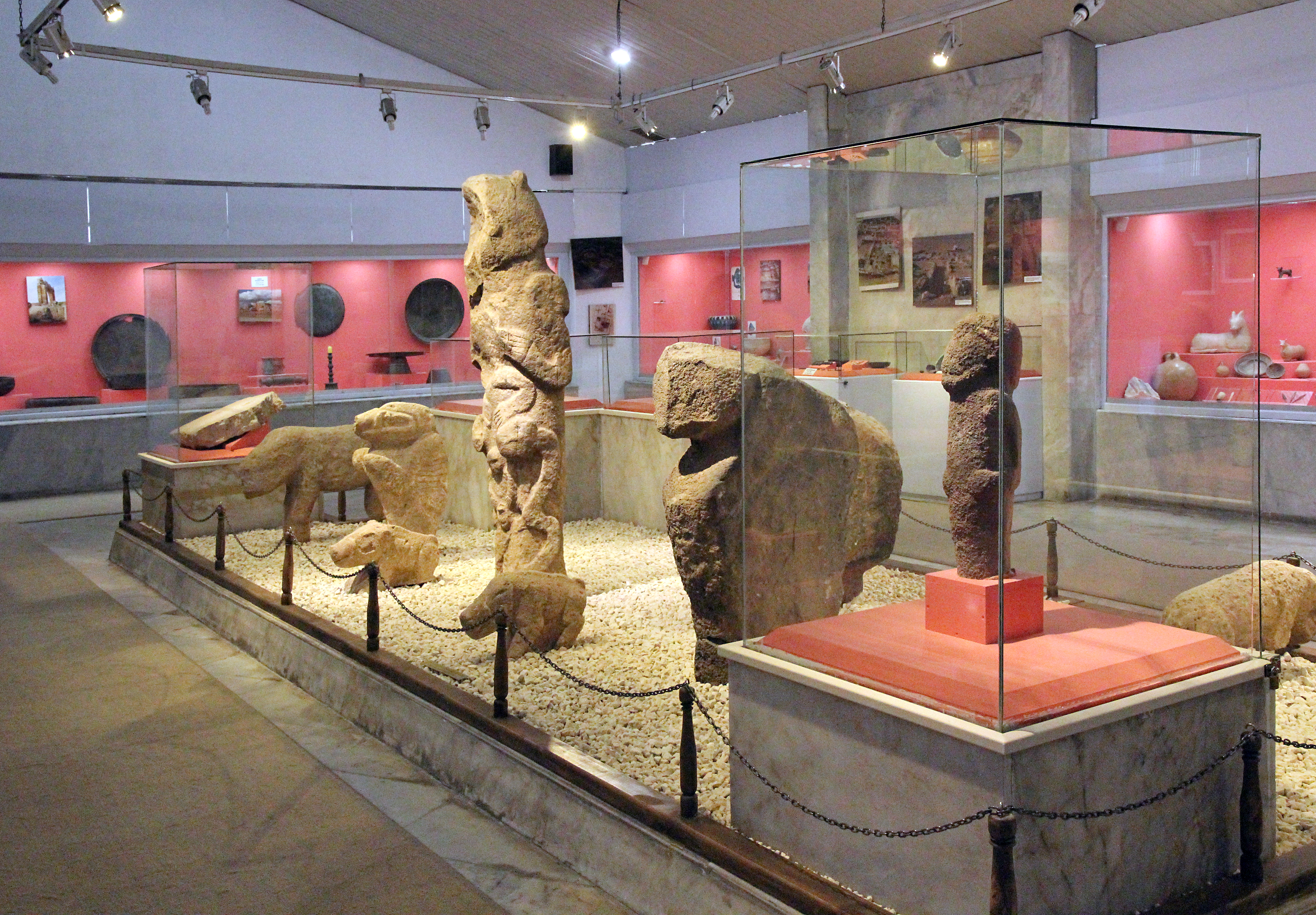
- From Göbeklitepe excavations

- Şanlıurfa Museum
- Established: 2015; 11 years ago
- Location: Haleplibahçe caddesi, Şanlıurfa, Turkey
- Coordinates: 37°09′13″N 38°46′54″E
- Type: Archaeology, Mosaic, Ethnography
- Collections: Neolithic, Chalcolithic Bronze Age Hittite Assyria, Babylonia
- Owner: Ministry of Culture and Tourism

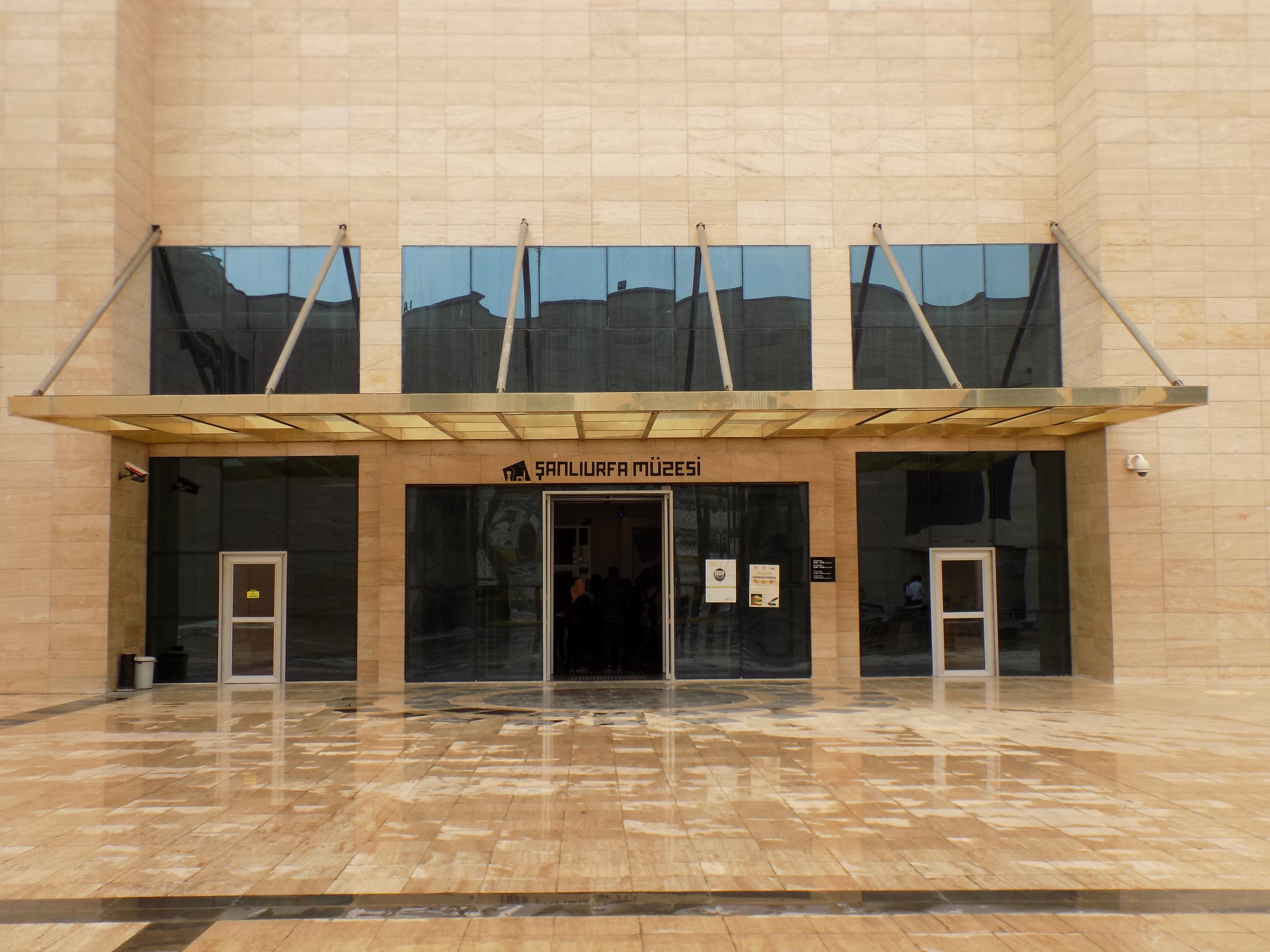
Museum entrance

Şanlıurfa Archaeology and Mosaic Museums or Şanlıurfa Museum (Turkish: Şanlıurfa Müzesi) are located in the south-eastern city of Şanlıurfa (also known as Urfa), Turkey. The museums contain remains of Şanlıurfa (known as Edessa in antiquity), Göbekli Tepe, Karahan Tepe, Harran (another ancient city which lies 44 kilometres (27 mi) southeast of Şanlıurfa), findings from the Southeastern Anatolia Project and ruins found in the hydroelectric dam reservoirs of Atatürk Dam, Birecik Dam and Karkamış Dam. Both museums are located at Haleplibahçe Mahallesi 2372, Sok Eyyübiye/Şanlıurfa (across the Şanlıurfa Piazza Mall).

== The location history and the building ==
The old museum located at Çamlık Caddesi was opened in 1969 with a display area of 1500sq.m. Later on annexes were added. Before that, archaeological finds were displayed in the rooms of the Şehit-Nüsret-elementary school, therefore in Atatürk-elementary school.

The current museum is on Haleplibahçe street, close to Balıklıgöl, a sacred pool. The museum opened in 2015, and replaced the former museum of Şanlıurfa on Çamlık street. With a closed area of 34,000 square metres (370,000 sq ft), it is one of the biggest museums of in Turkey. The museum consists of two major buildings. To the north is the archaeology museum and to the south is the mosaic museum.

The museum has 3 floors and covers 2,500 square meters of indoor space.

== The mosaic museum ==
The mosaic of Orpheus was created in 184 A.D. in Edessa. It was found in 1980, and was taken to United States by illegal means. After some handovers, it returned to Şanlıurfa from the Dallas Museum in 2015.

== The archaeology section ==
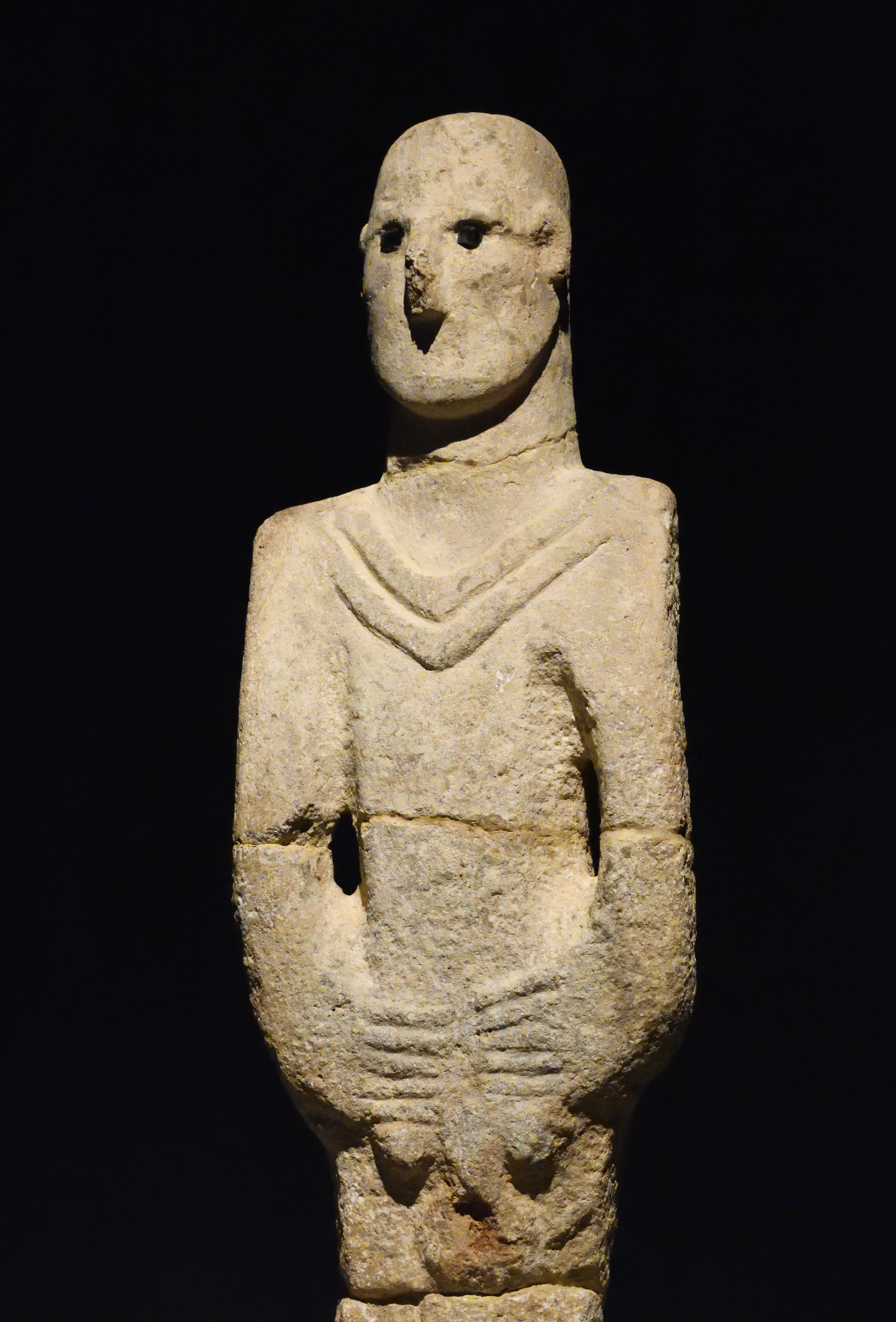
Urfa Man, in the Şanlıurfa Museum; sandstone, 1.80 meters, c. 9,000 BC

In the ground and upper floor there are four exhibition halls. The first exhibition hall is reserved for Assyrian, Babylonian and Hittite artifacts. In the second and third halls, Neolithic, Chalcolithic and Bronze Age items such as stone tools, terracota ceramic tools, stamps, pithoi, necklaces, figurines, metallic tools, ornaments, and idols are exhibited. One of the most important items is a 9500-year-old sculpture which is the oldest-known life-size human sculpture. In the ethnographic section, clothes, silver and bronze ornaments, handworks, doors with epitaph, examples of calligraphy, and hand written Korans are exhibited. In the yard, there are various archaeologic items.

It includes the Urfa Man statue, dated c. 9000 BC (11,000 years ago), being considered as the oldest life-sized sculpture of a human already discovered.

== Gallery ==
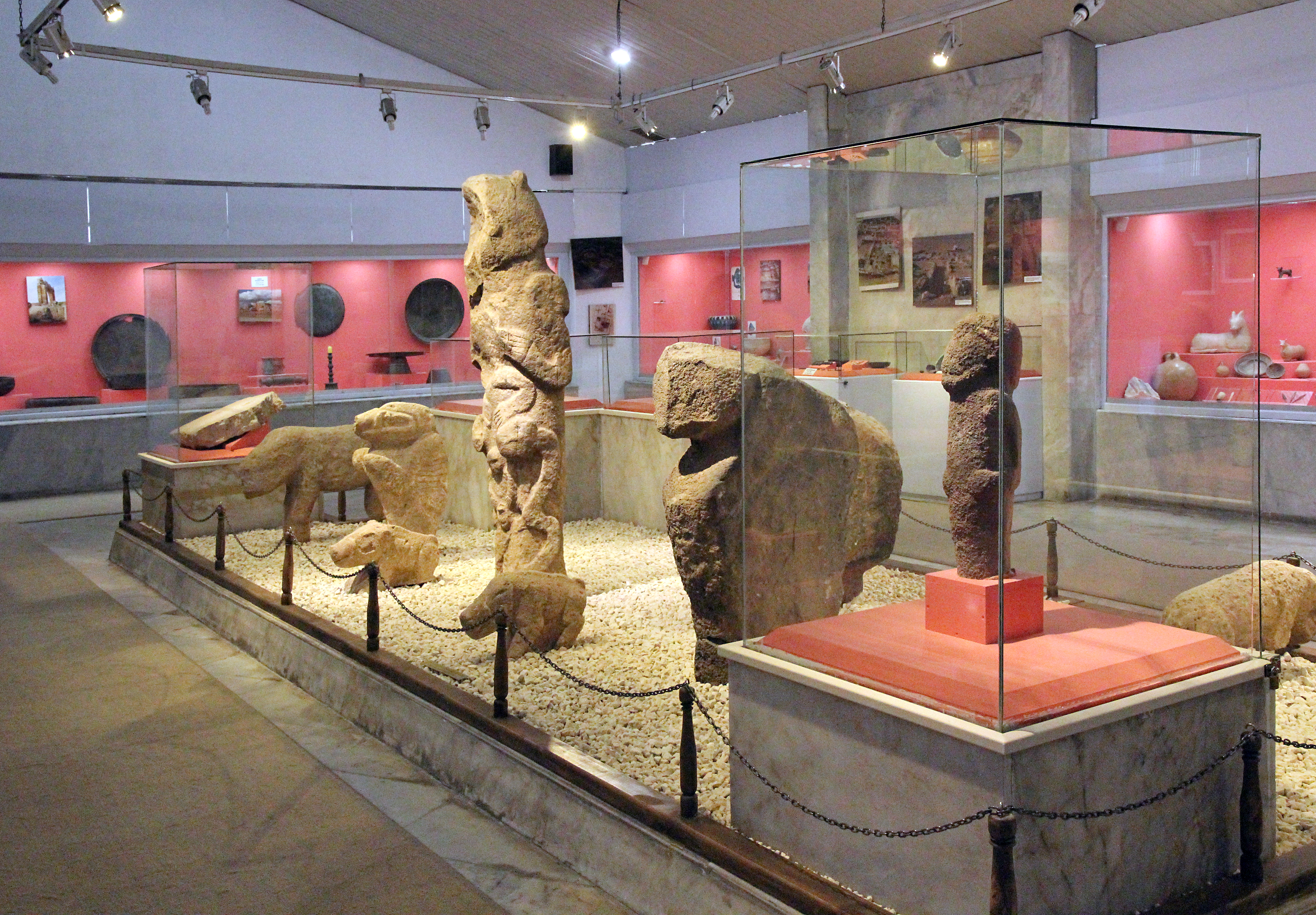
Steles and sculptures from Göbekli Tepe

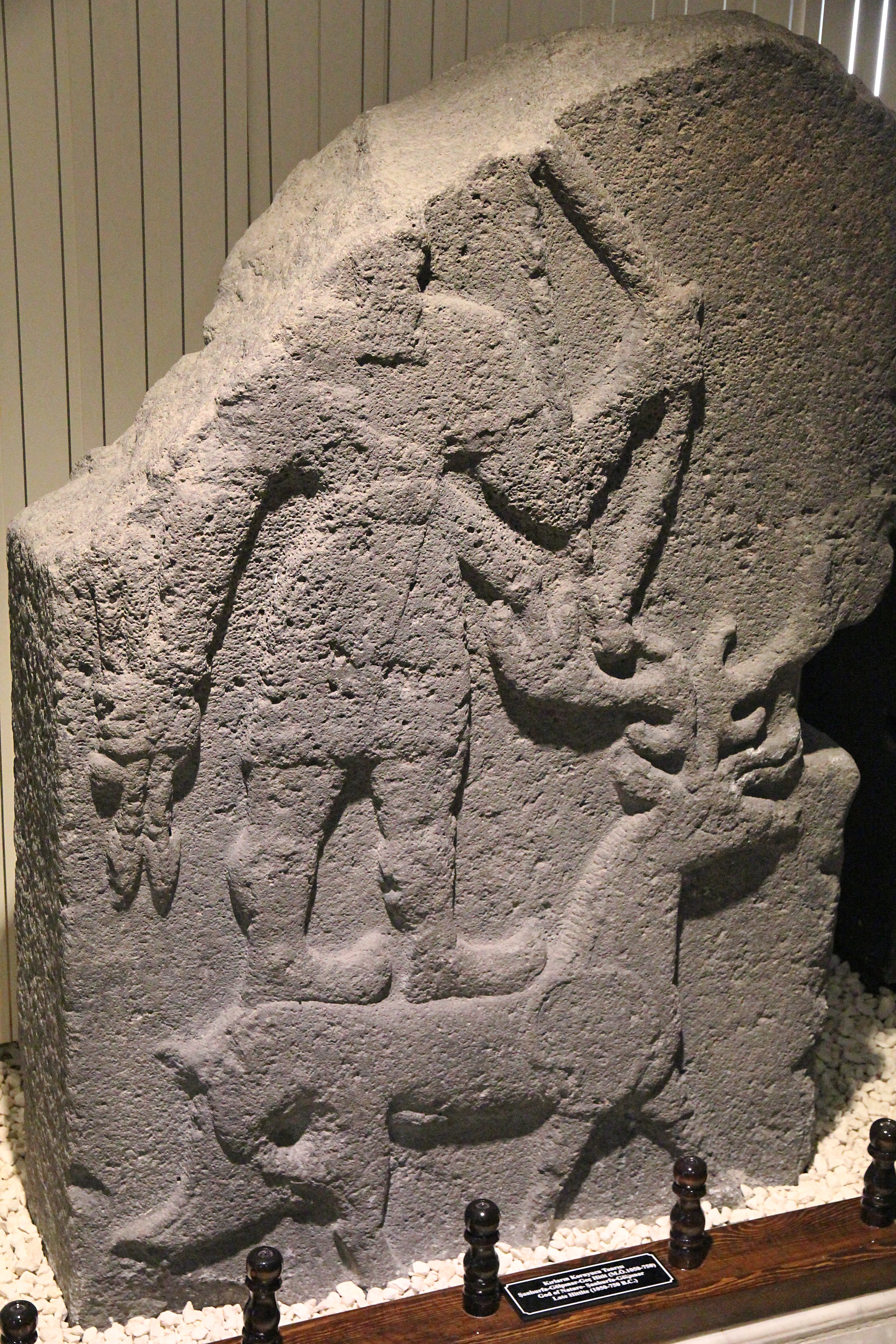
Hittite Stele from Gölpinar

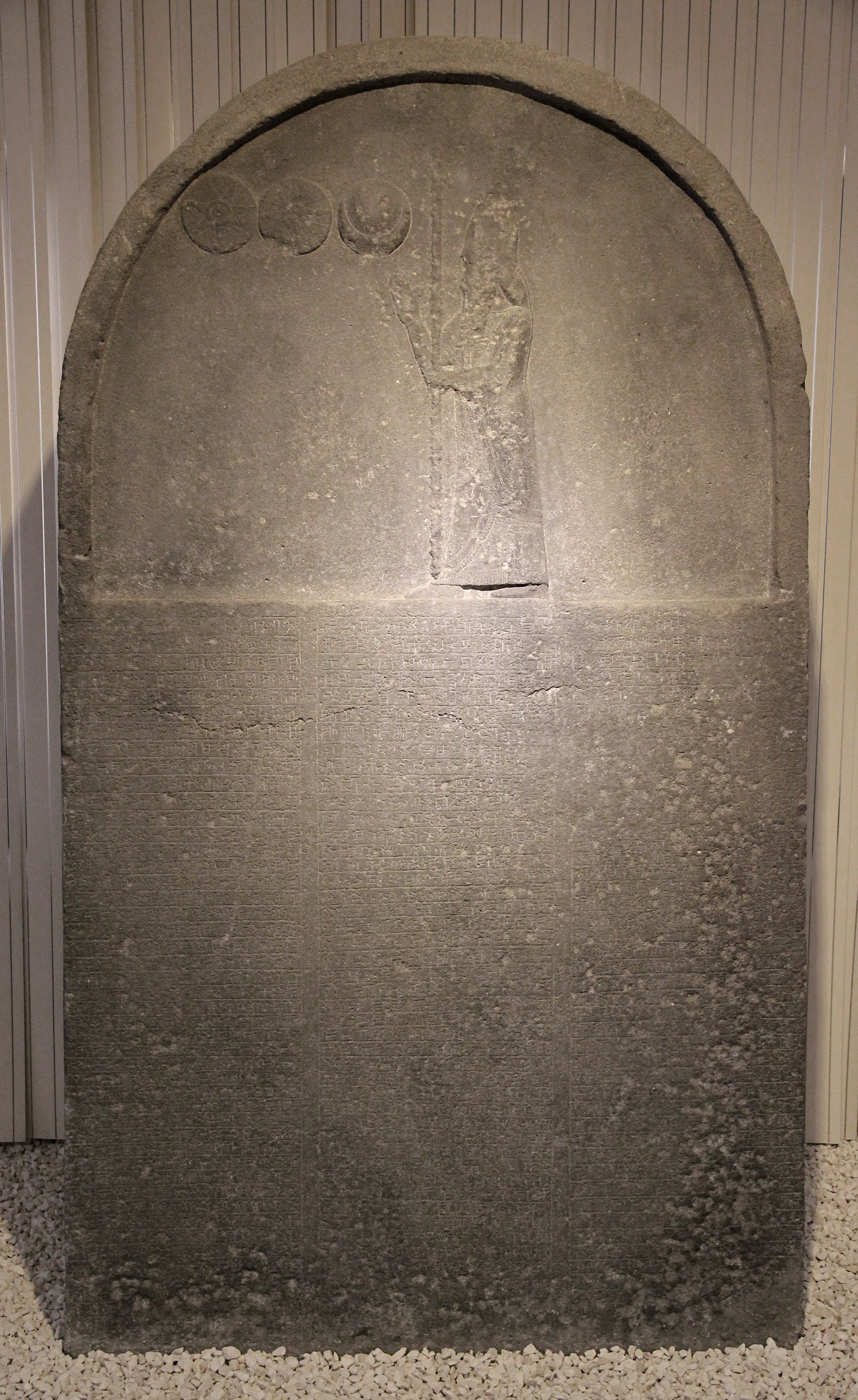
Stele of Nabonid from Harran

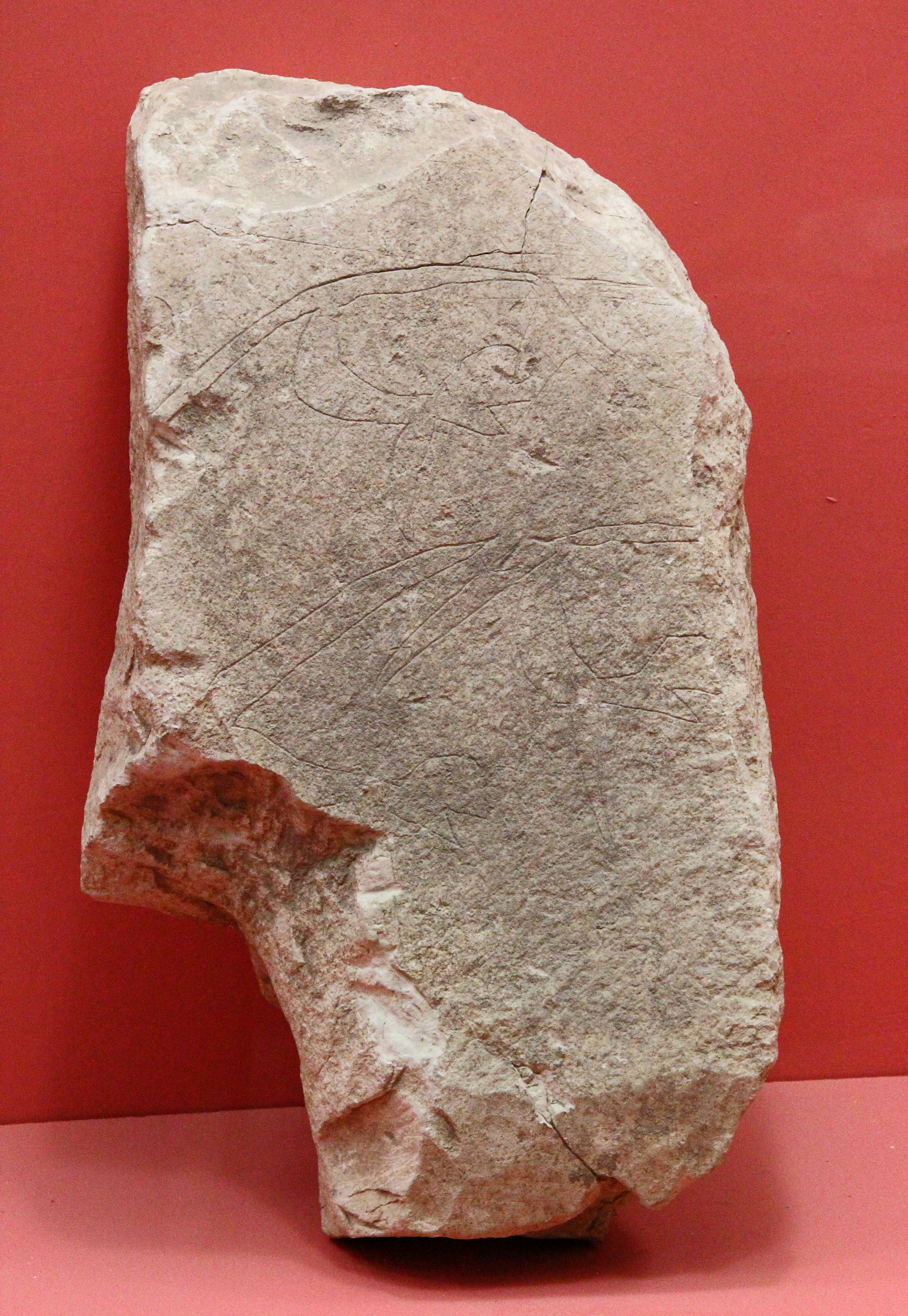
Fragment with scribing from Nevalı Çori

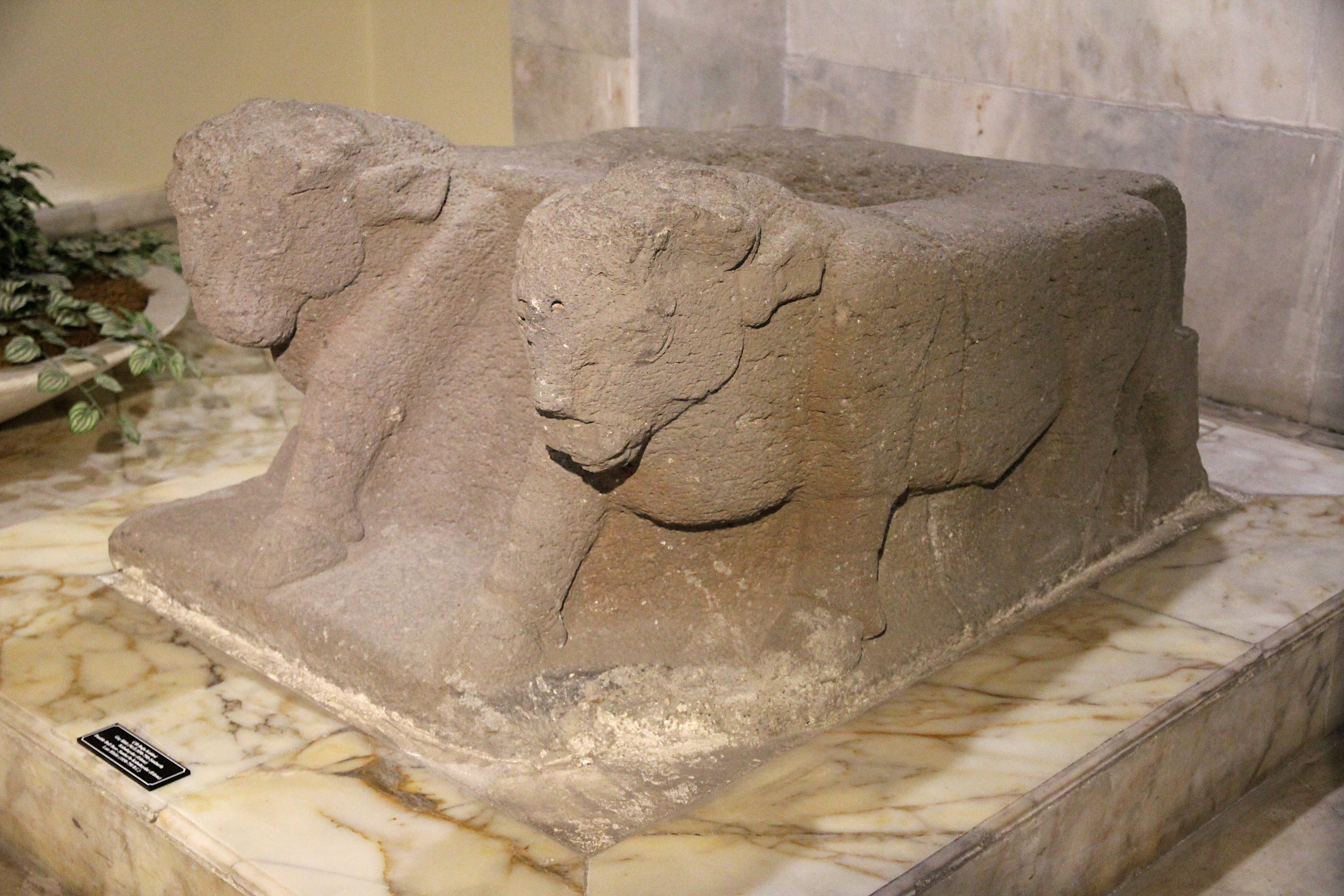
Basis from Kabahaydar

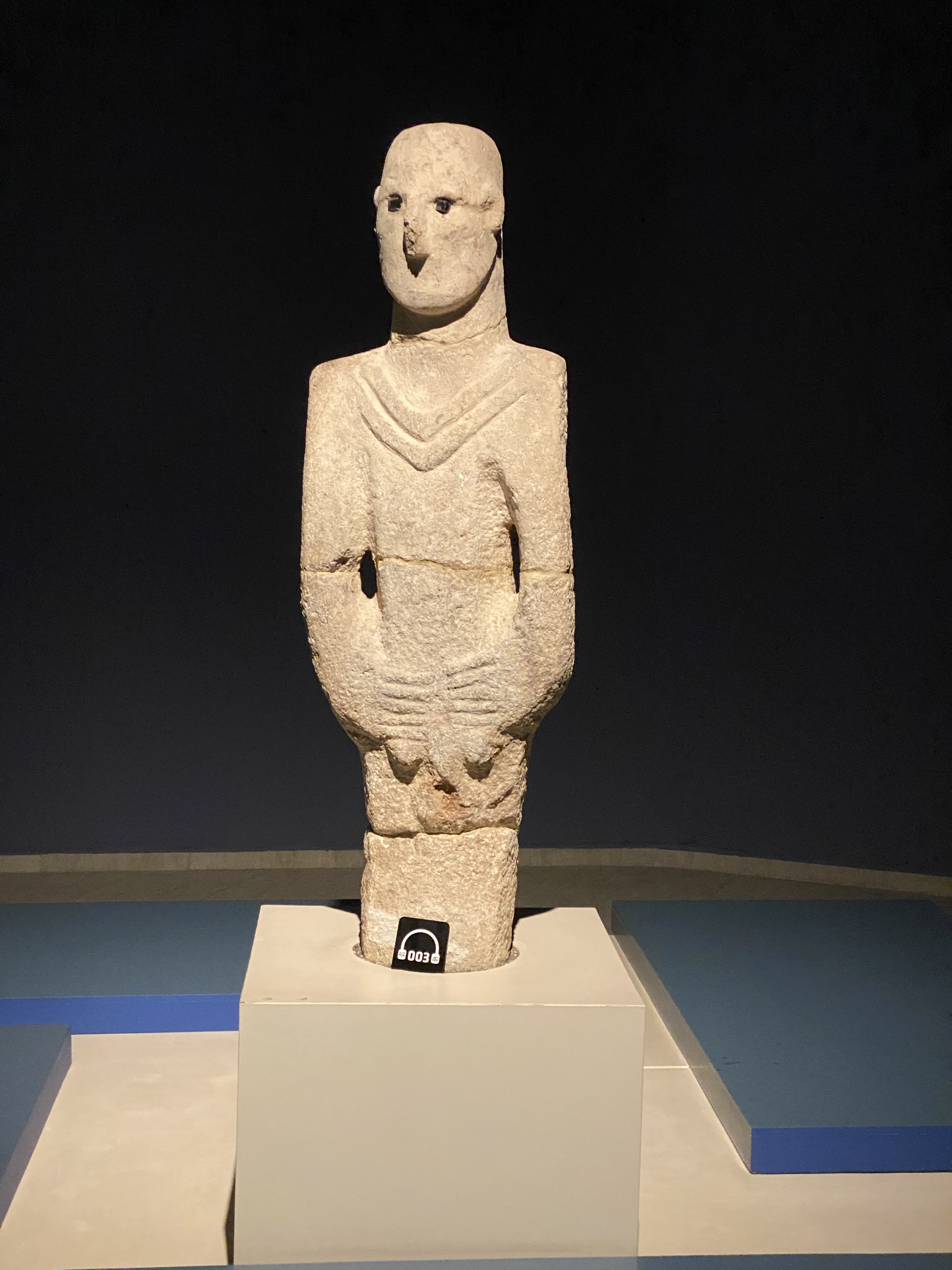
Balikligöl statue

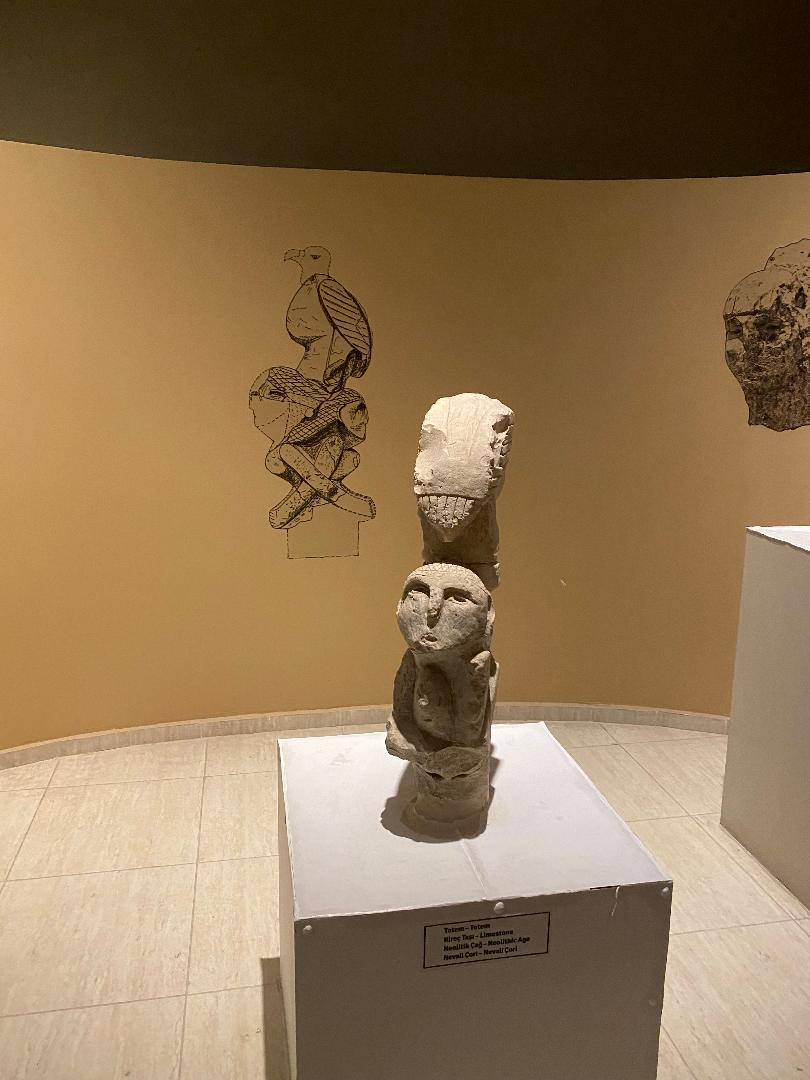
Totem

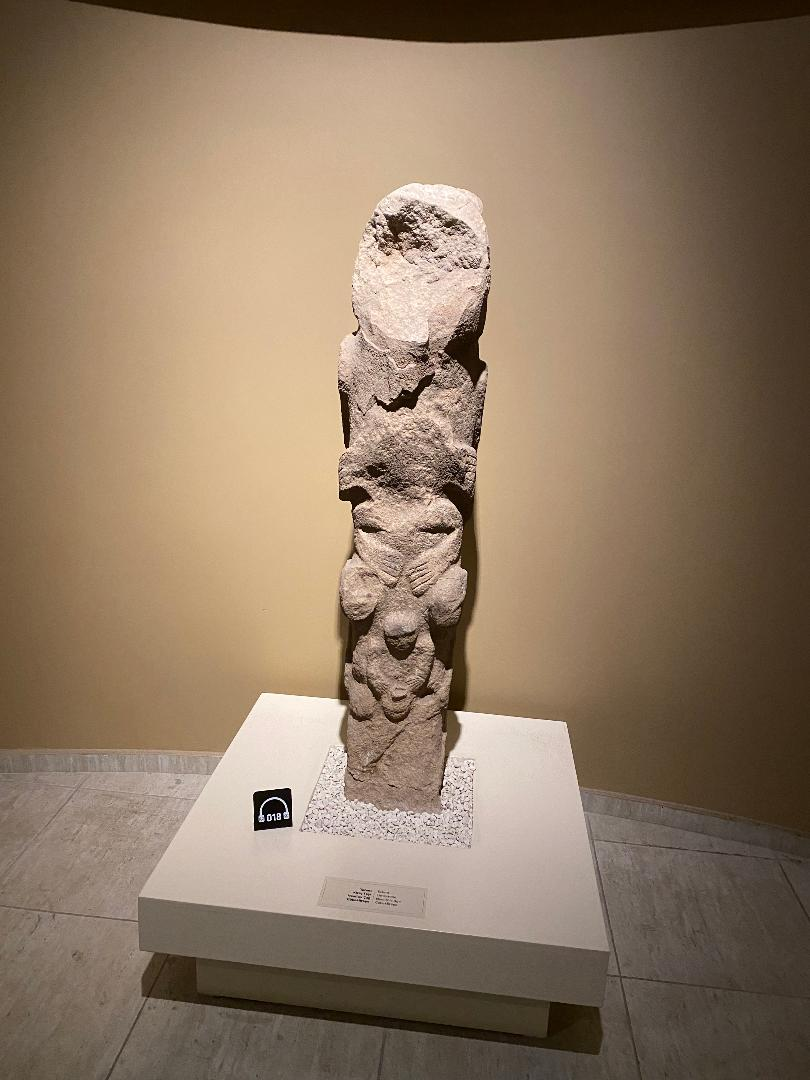
Göbeklitepe totem

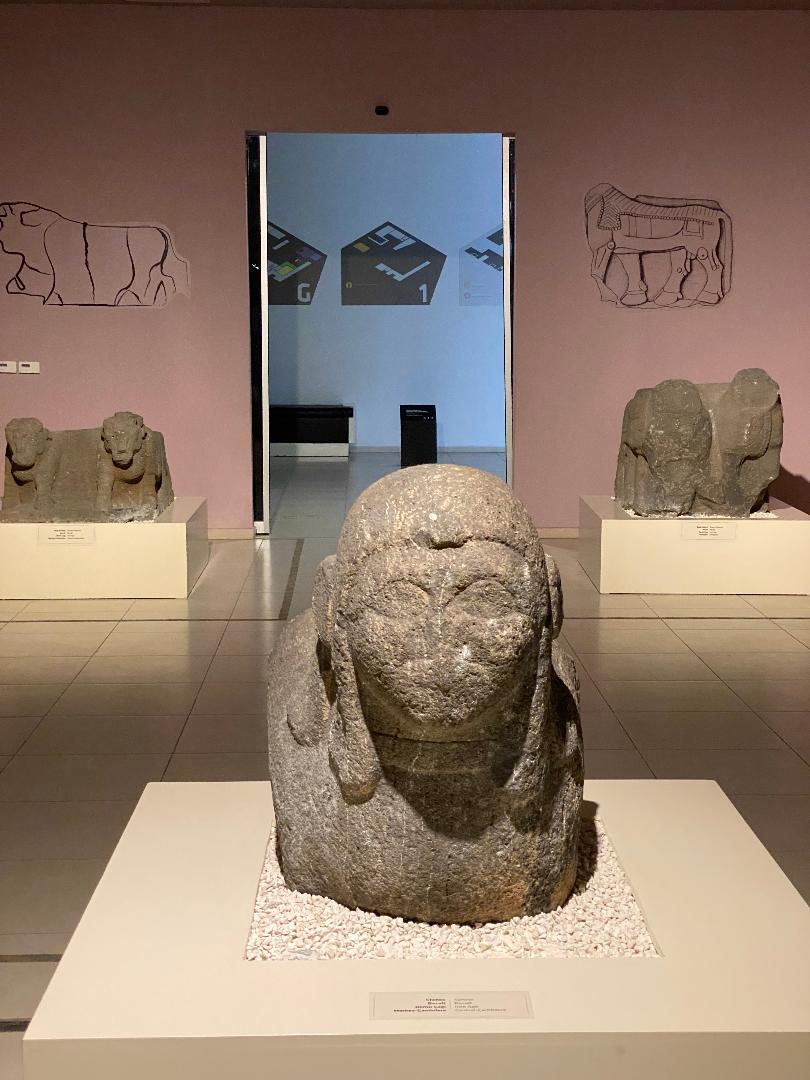
Sphinx from Central-Çamlıdere Iron Age
