= Karahan Tepe =

Neolithic archaeological site in Turkey

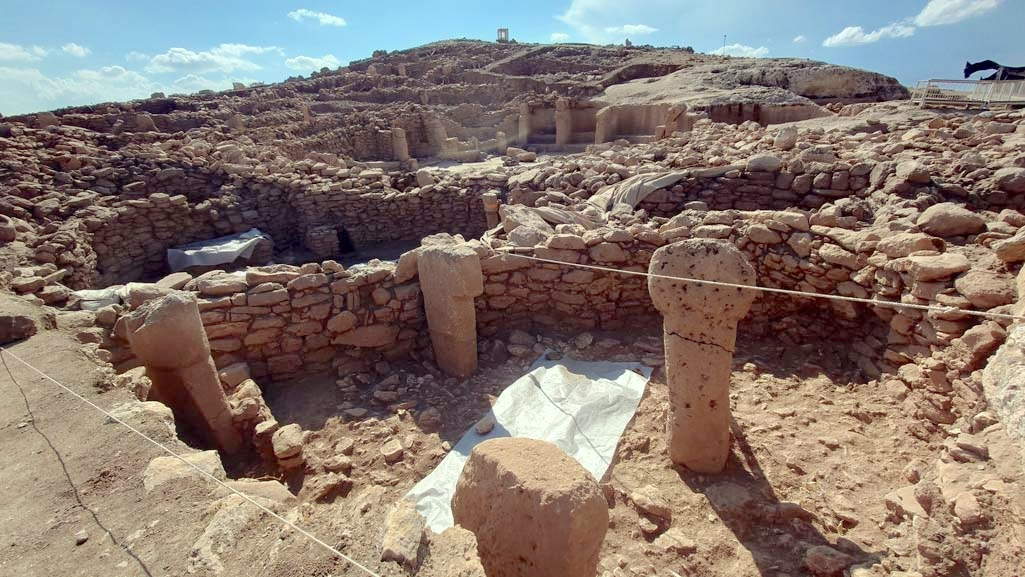
- Karahan Tepe in 2023

- Location in Turkey
- 37°05′33″N 39°18′13″E
- Type: Settlement
- Periods: Pre-Pottery Neolithic A to B
- Location: Şanlıurfa Province, Turkey

History
- Built: c. 9750 BCE
- Abandoned: c. 9400 BCE

Site notes
- Discovered: 1997

Karahan Tepe is a Pre-Pottery Neolithic archaeological site in Şanlıurfa, Turkey. The site is in the same geographical region as Göbekli Tepe, and archaeologists have also uncovered T-shaped stelae there and believe that the sites are related. Additionally, the site may be the earliest known human village, predating the construction of Göbekli Tepe by several centuries, dating to between 10,000 and 9500 BC.

The site, discovered in 1997 by Bahattin Celik (Harran University), is located near Yağmurlu and roughly 46 kilometers east of Göbekli Tepe, which is often called its sister site. It is part of the Göbekli Tepe Culture and Karahan Tepe Excavations project. The area is known as "Keçilitepe" by local people. It is part of a group of about 12 similar sites being investigated, known as "Taş Tepeler". Research is being done to better understand the organization of the workforce and the degree and nature of the specialization involved in the construction of these monuments.

== History ==
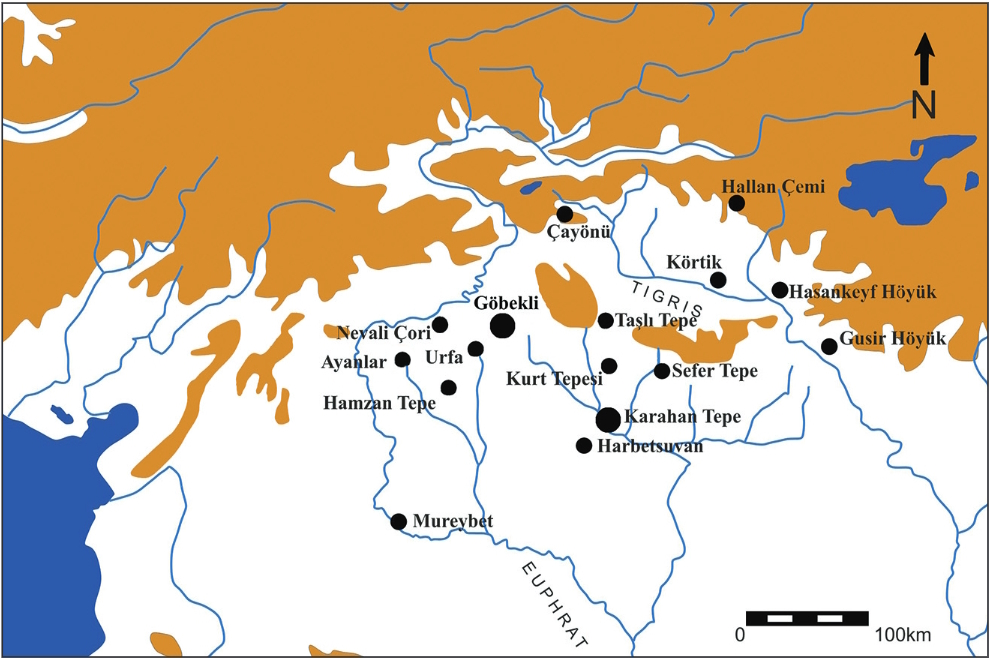
Main Upper Mesopotamian Pre-Pottery Neolithic centers, with Karahan Tepe

The ancient structures at Karahan Tepe were discovered in 1997 by "researchers near the Kargalı neighborhood in the Tek Tek Mountains National Park."

Necmi Karul, an archeologist at Istanbul University, told Anadolu Agency in 2019, "Last year, excavation work restarted in Karahan tepe [Kectepe] – around 60 km from where Göbekli tepe is located – and we encountered traces of special structures, obelisks, animal sculptures, and descriptions as well as similar symbolism". The site was filled with dirt and rubble at some point, preserving T-topped columns carved into bedrock. These structures have been described as 'phallic totems'.

Main diet consisted of gazelles and legumes.

== Site ==
The Karahan tepe archaeological site covers almost 10 hectares, which increases by another five hectares if the quarries for the T-shaped columns are included.

As of 2023, around 5% of the surface extent of the site has been excavated.

=== Figural artifacts ===
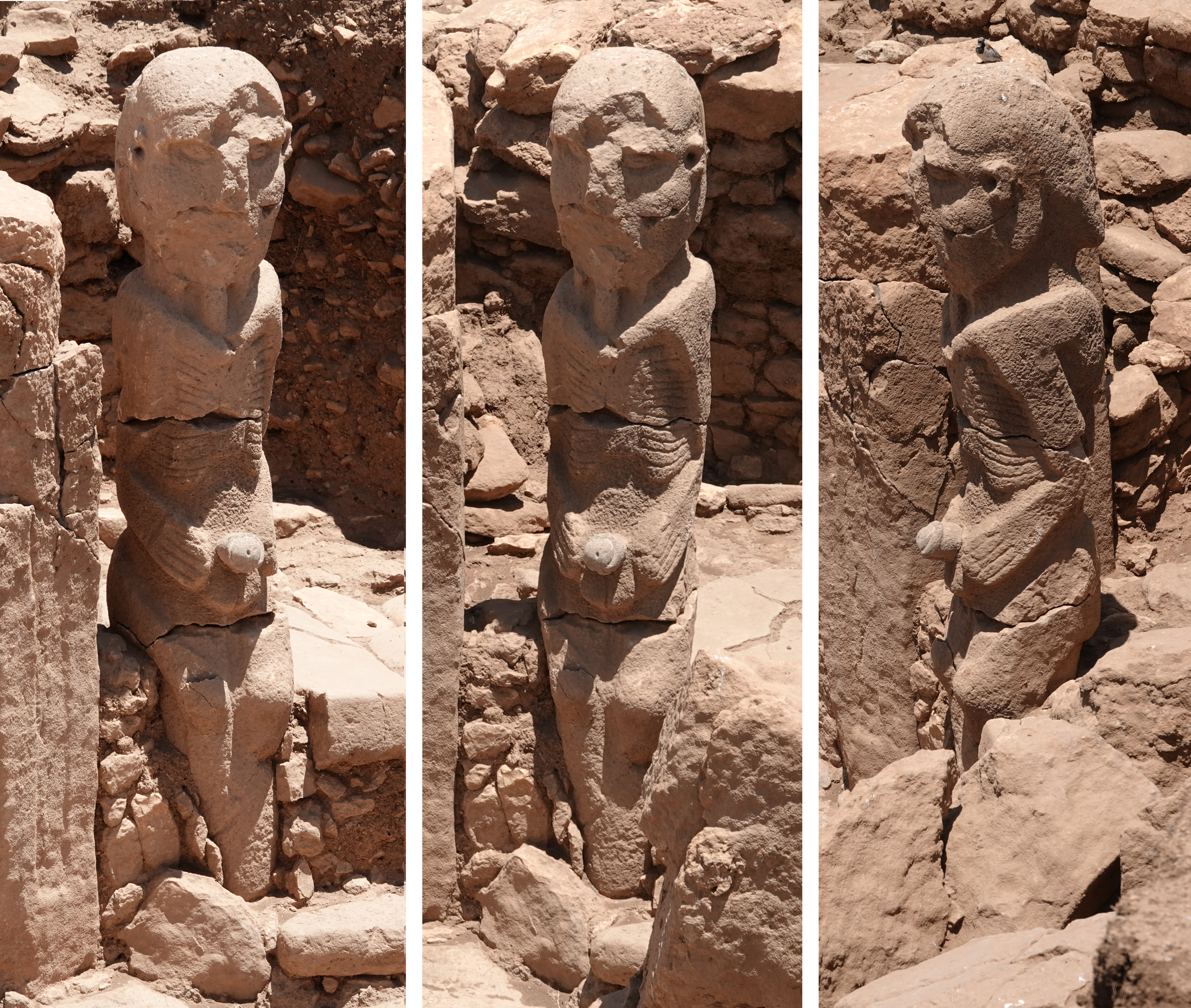
Karahan Tepe anthropomorphic statue (2.3 meters), naked and holding phallus with both hands. There is a V-shaped collar around the neck, and the fingers and ribs are marked with deep incised lines. Broadly similar to the Urfa Man).

In September 2023, Turkish and German experts discovered further sculptures from the so-called Tepeler cultures: a statue of a vulture and a 2.3 meter high anthropomorphic statue were found. The naked figure, which is probably depicted as sitting, holds his phallus with both hands. The fingers and ribs were marked with deep incised lines, and a kind of V-shaped collar around the neck. This same motif is also known from other finds, such as the so-called Urfa Man, an around 1.8 meter high sandstone statue that was discovered in 1993 during construction work near the city of Şanlıurfa.

In 2025, researchers have unearthed a t-shaped stone pillar bearing a carved human face. The pillar is 1.3 meters high and is dating back 11,000 years.

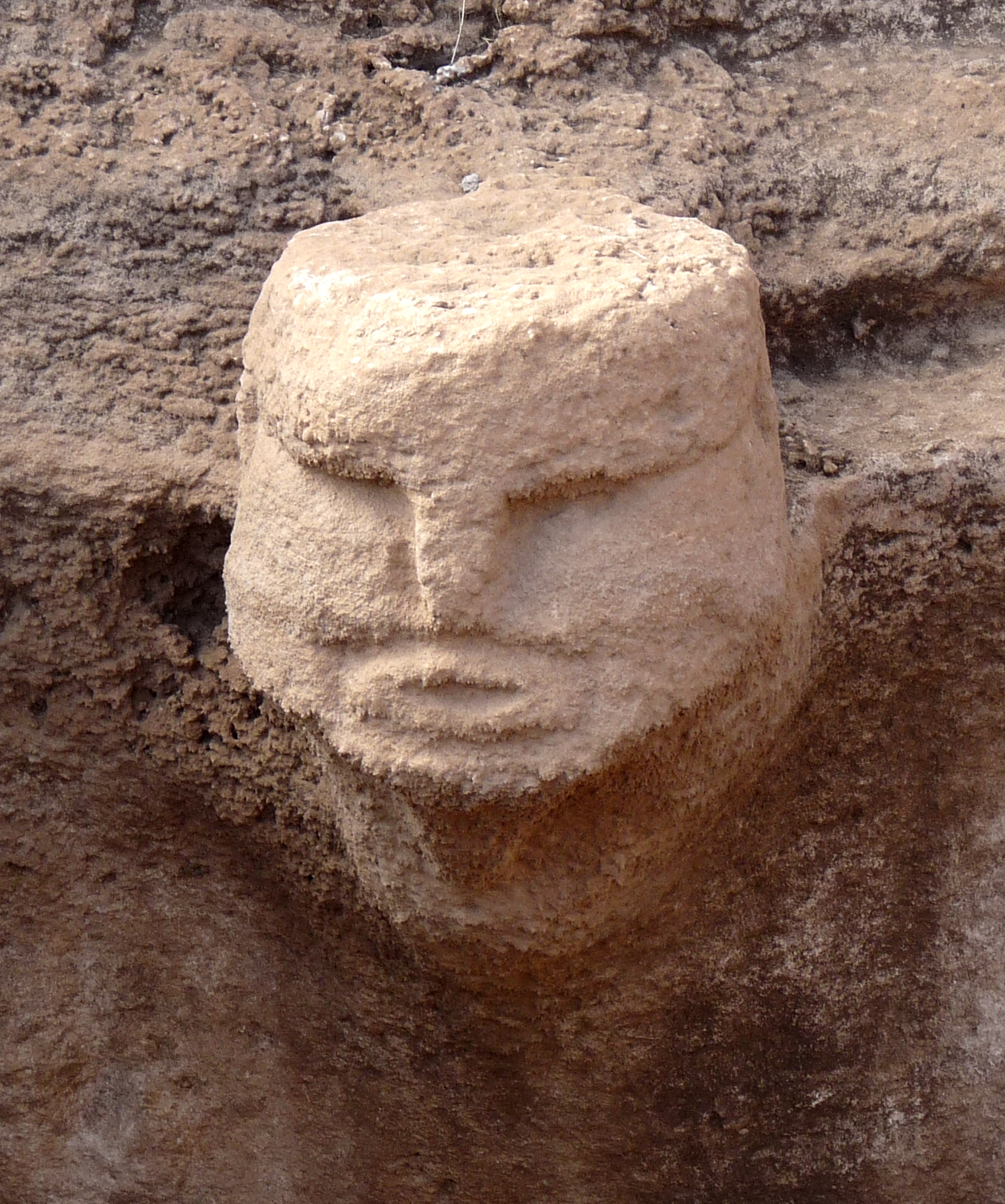
Carved head in structure AB (on site)

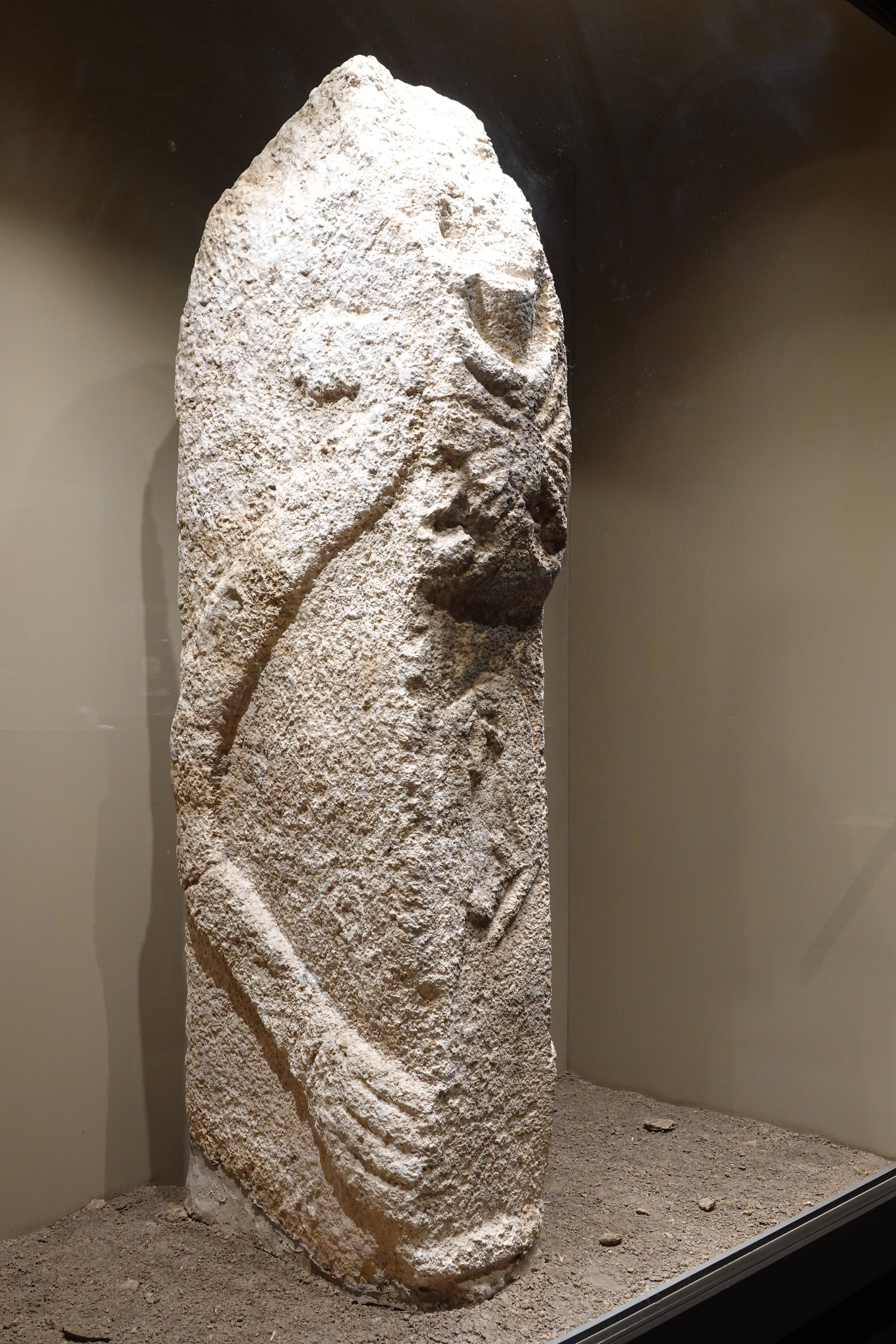
Human stela (head lost), Karahan Tepe

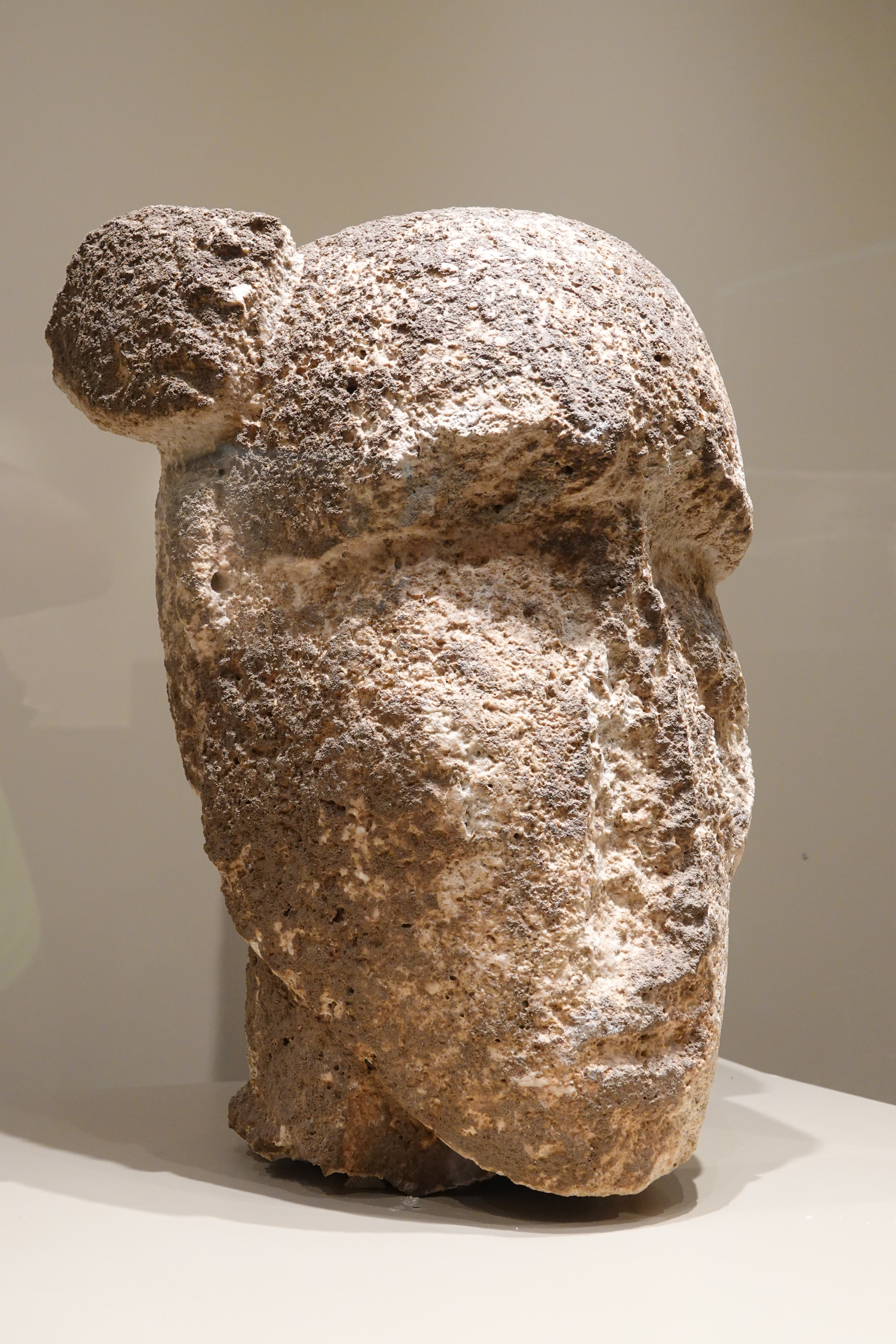
Human face (Urfa Museum)

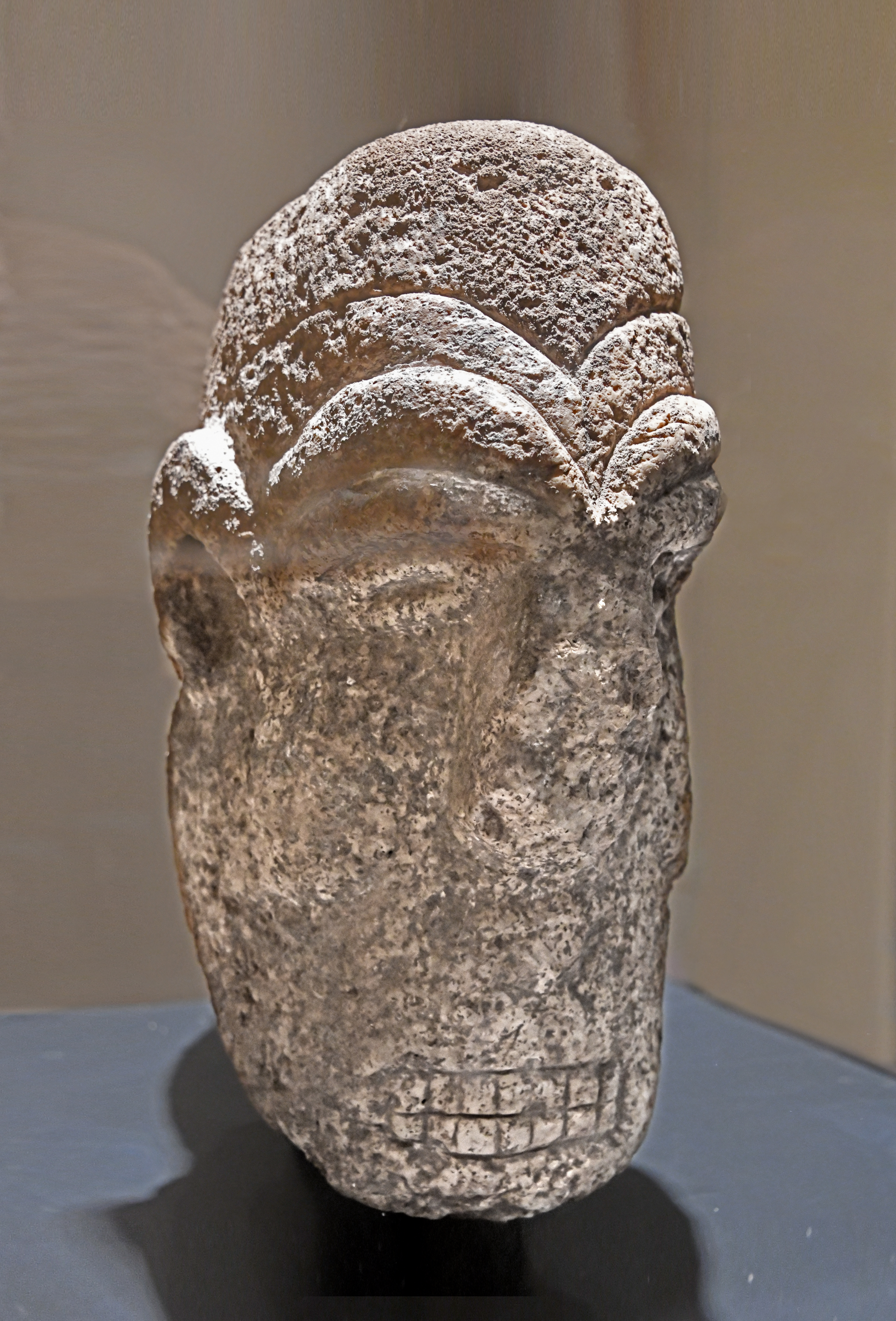
Human face (Urfa Museum)

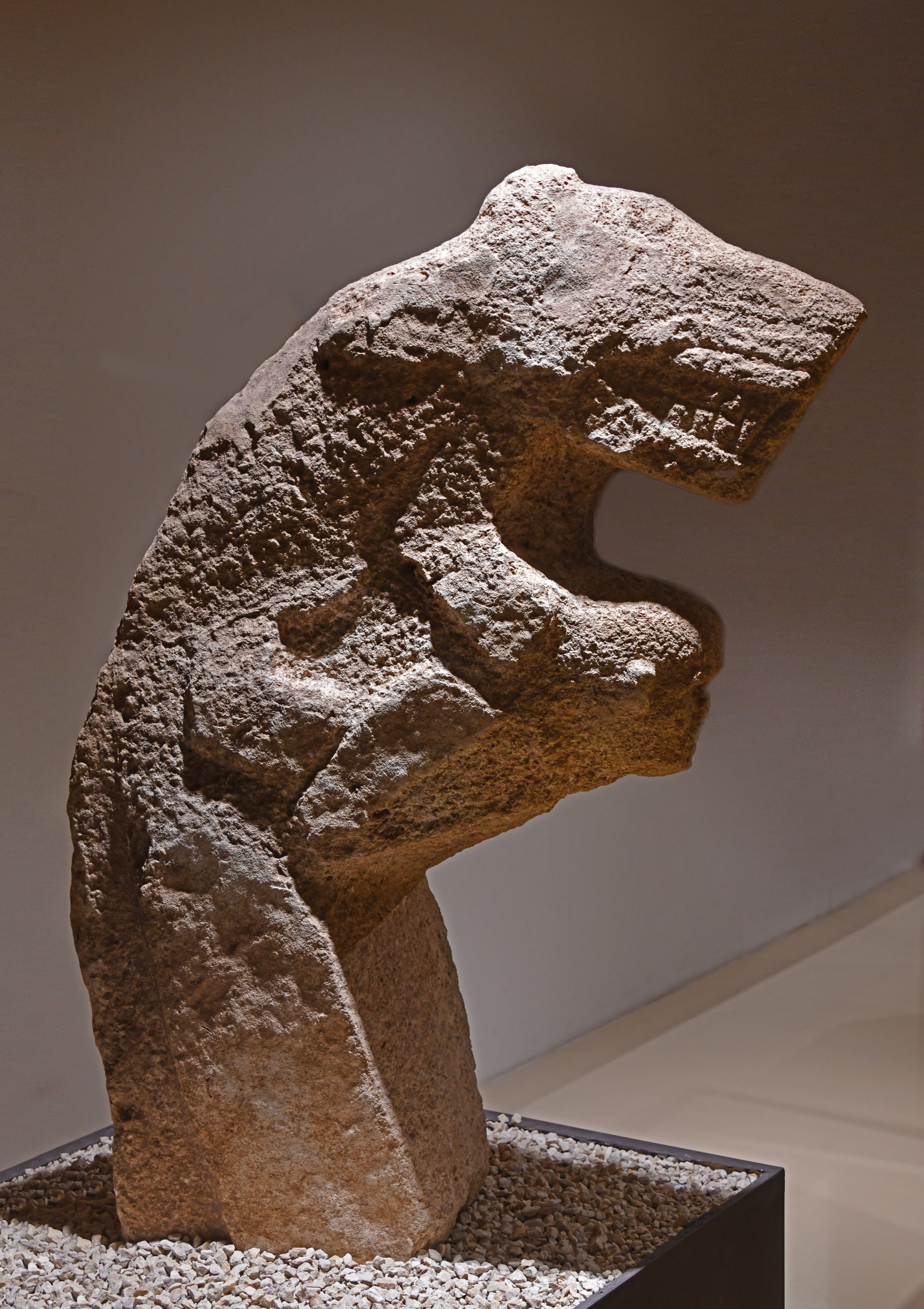
Human with a leopard on back (Urfa Museum)

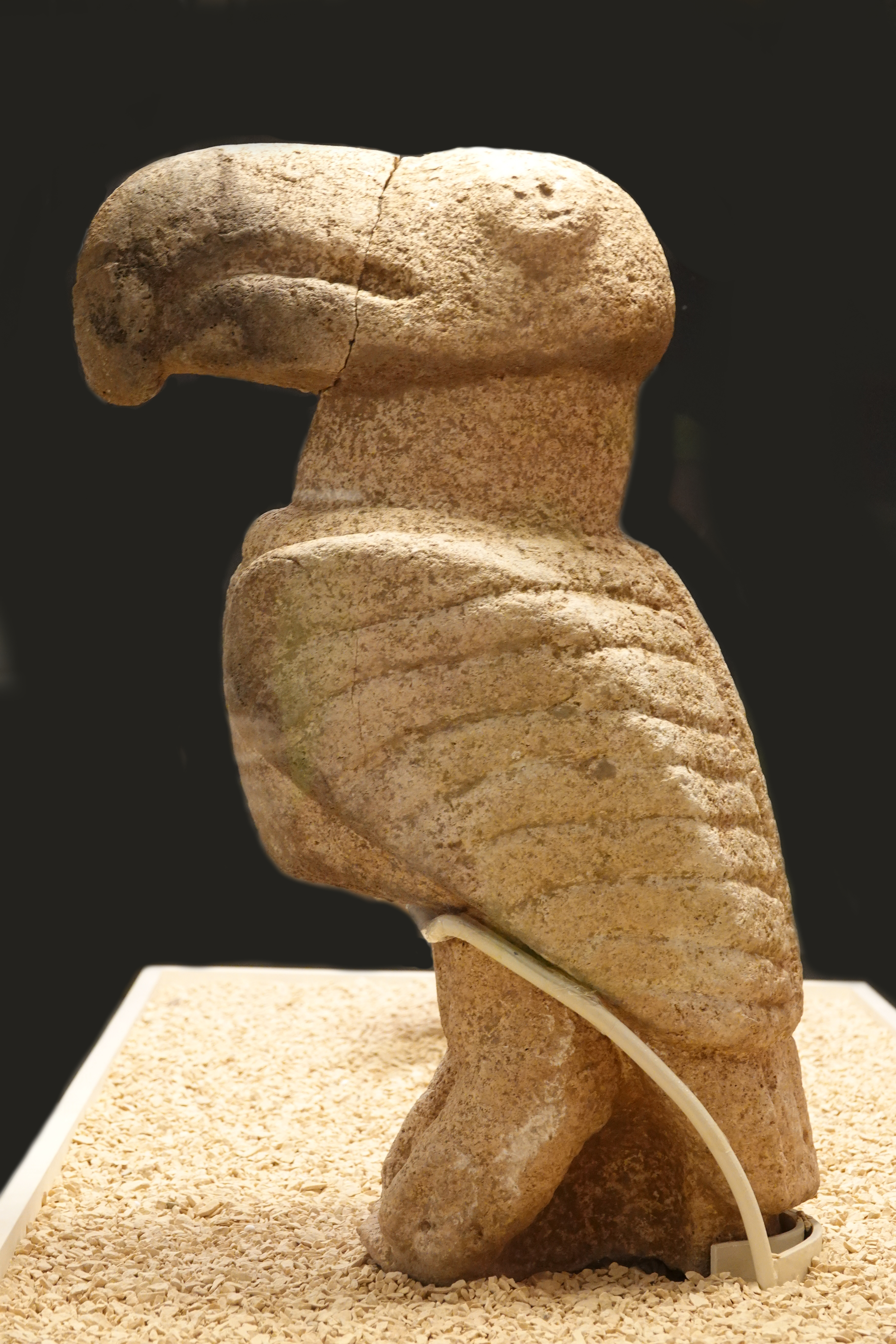
Vulture (Urfa Museum)

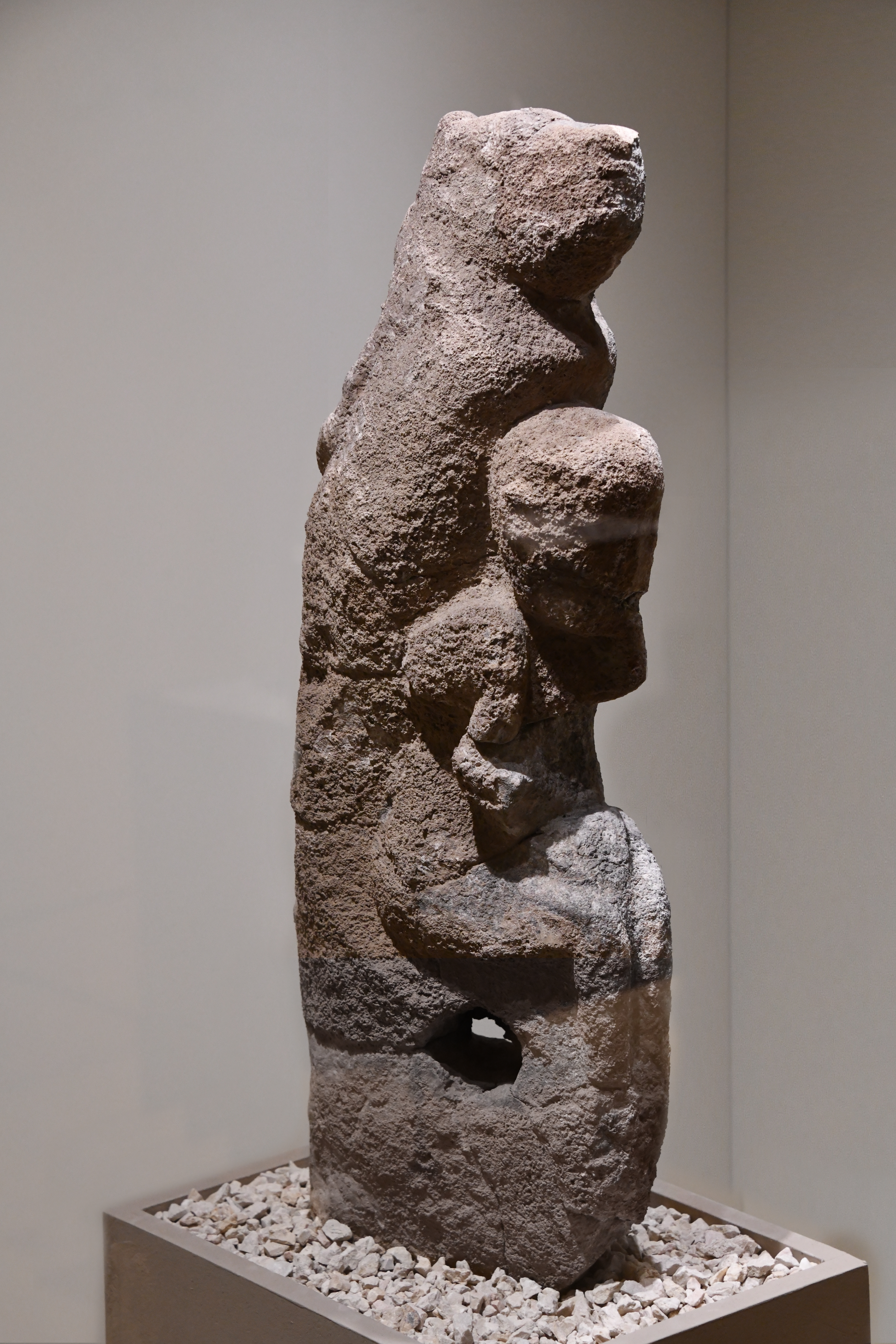
Totem (Urfa Museum)

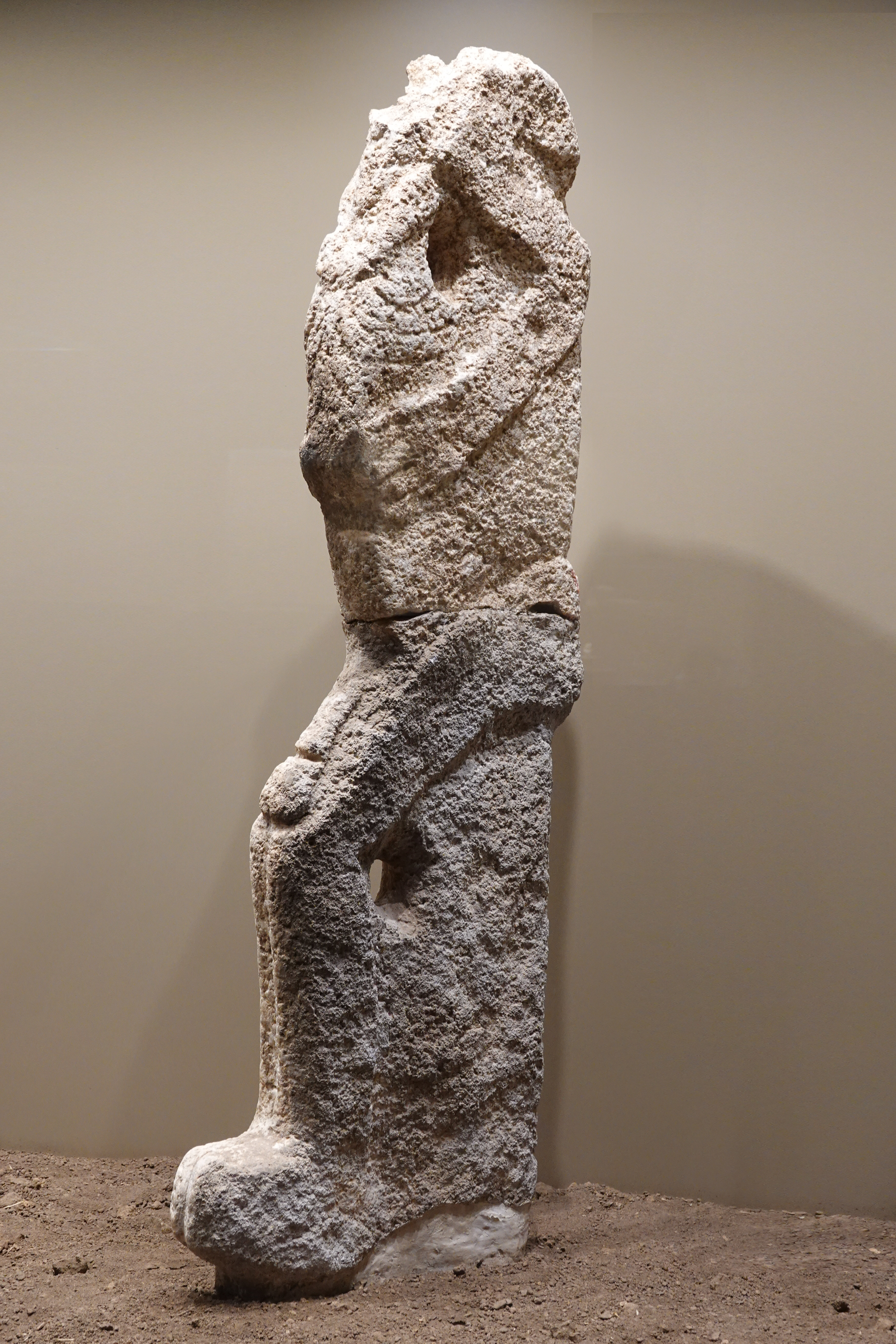
Seated man with extended penis (Urfa Museum)

=== Site images ===
The site contains numerous T-shaped pillars similar to those of Gobekli Tepe. More than 266 pillars were observed as of 2000.

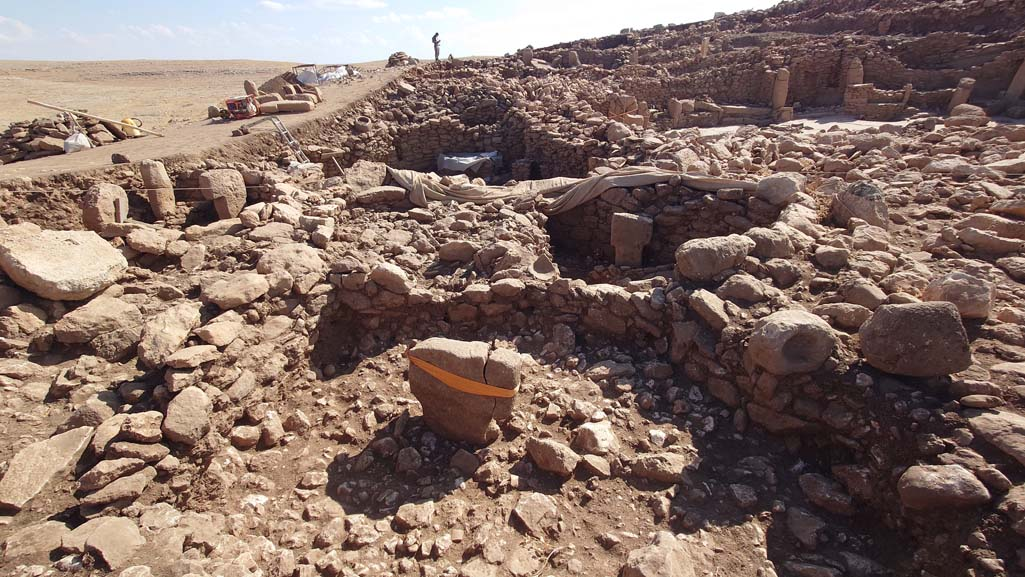

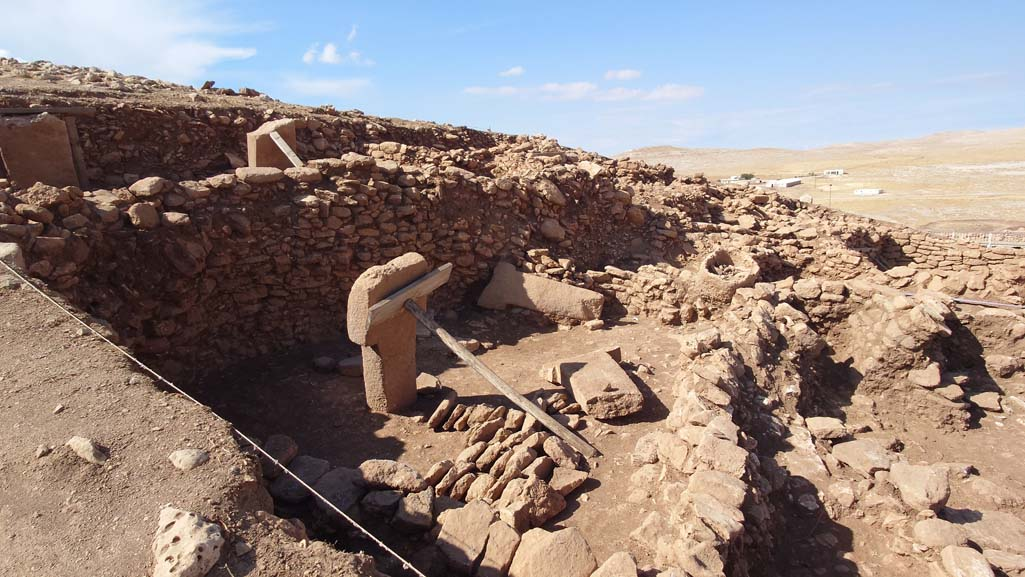

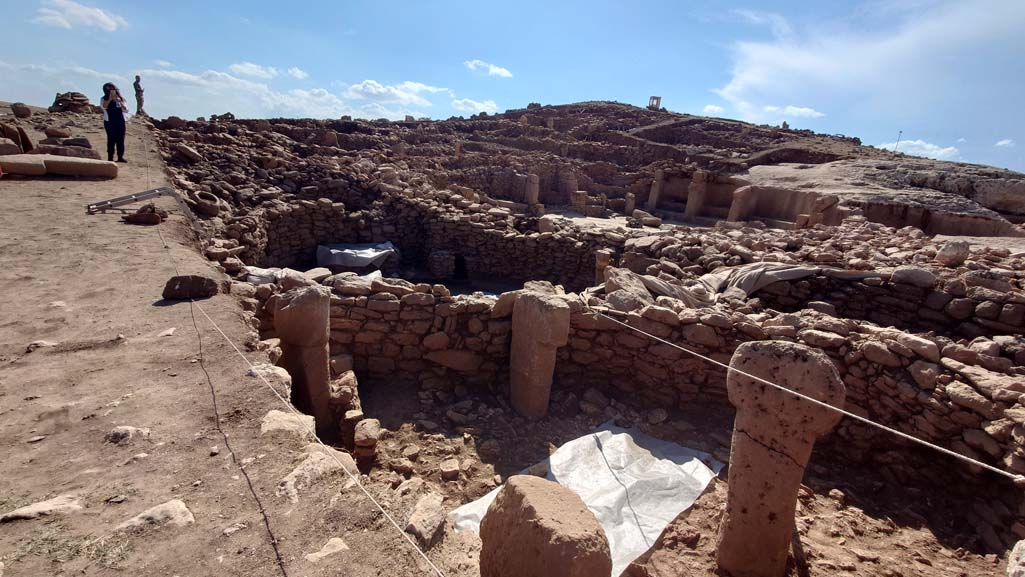

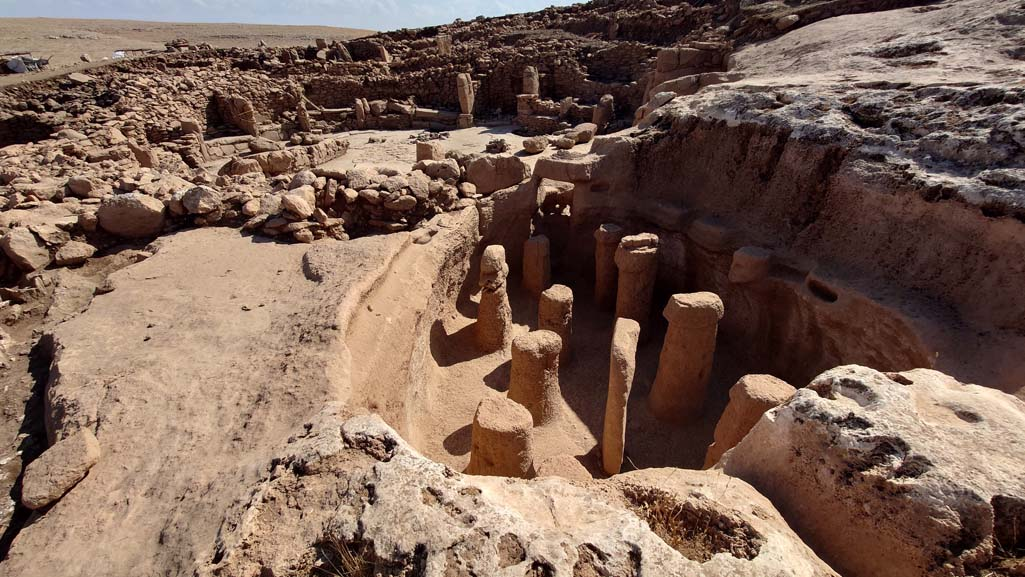

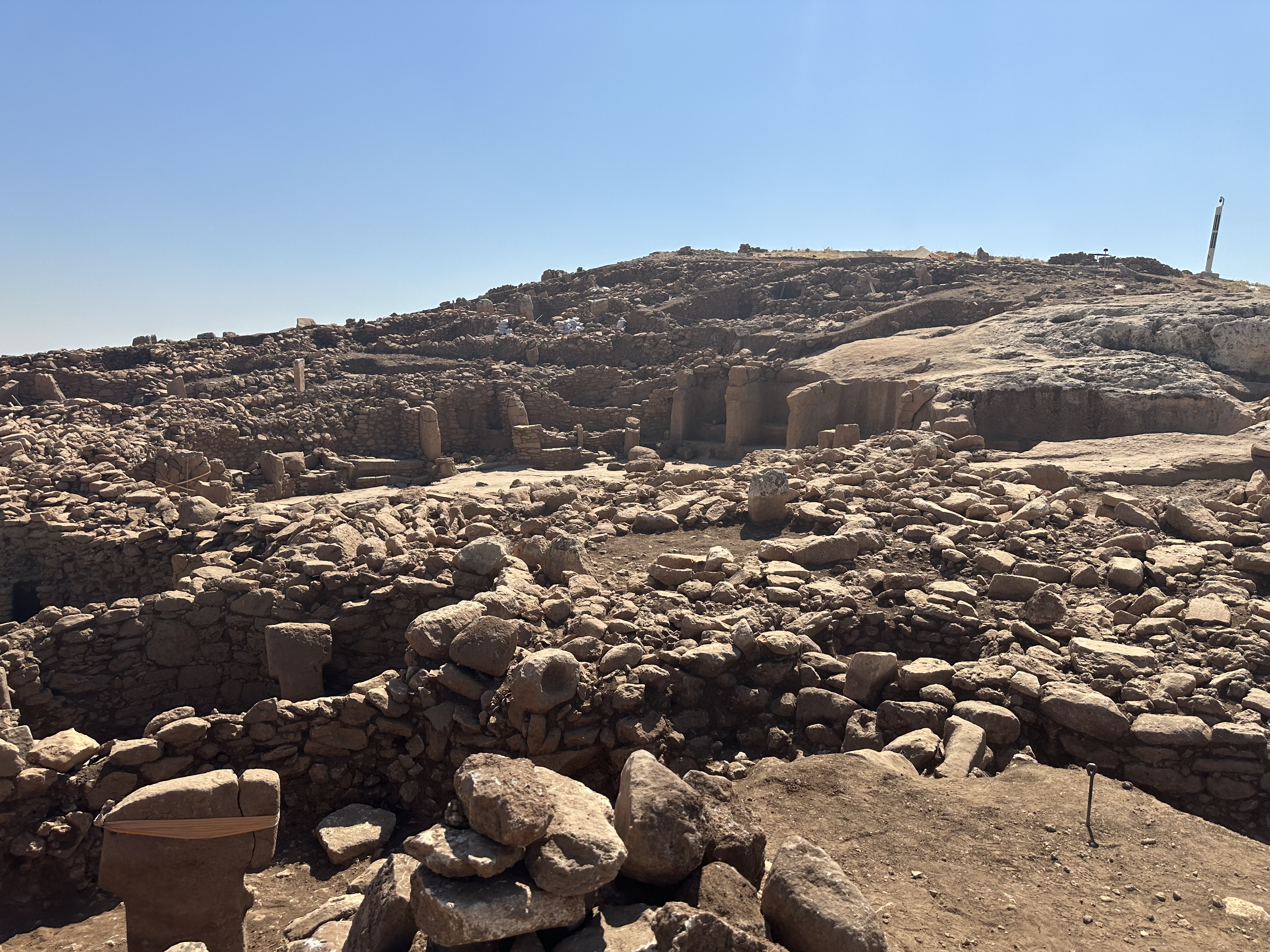

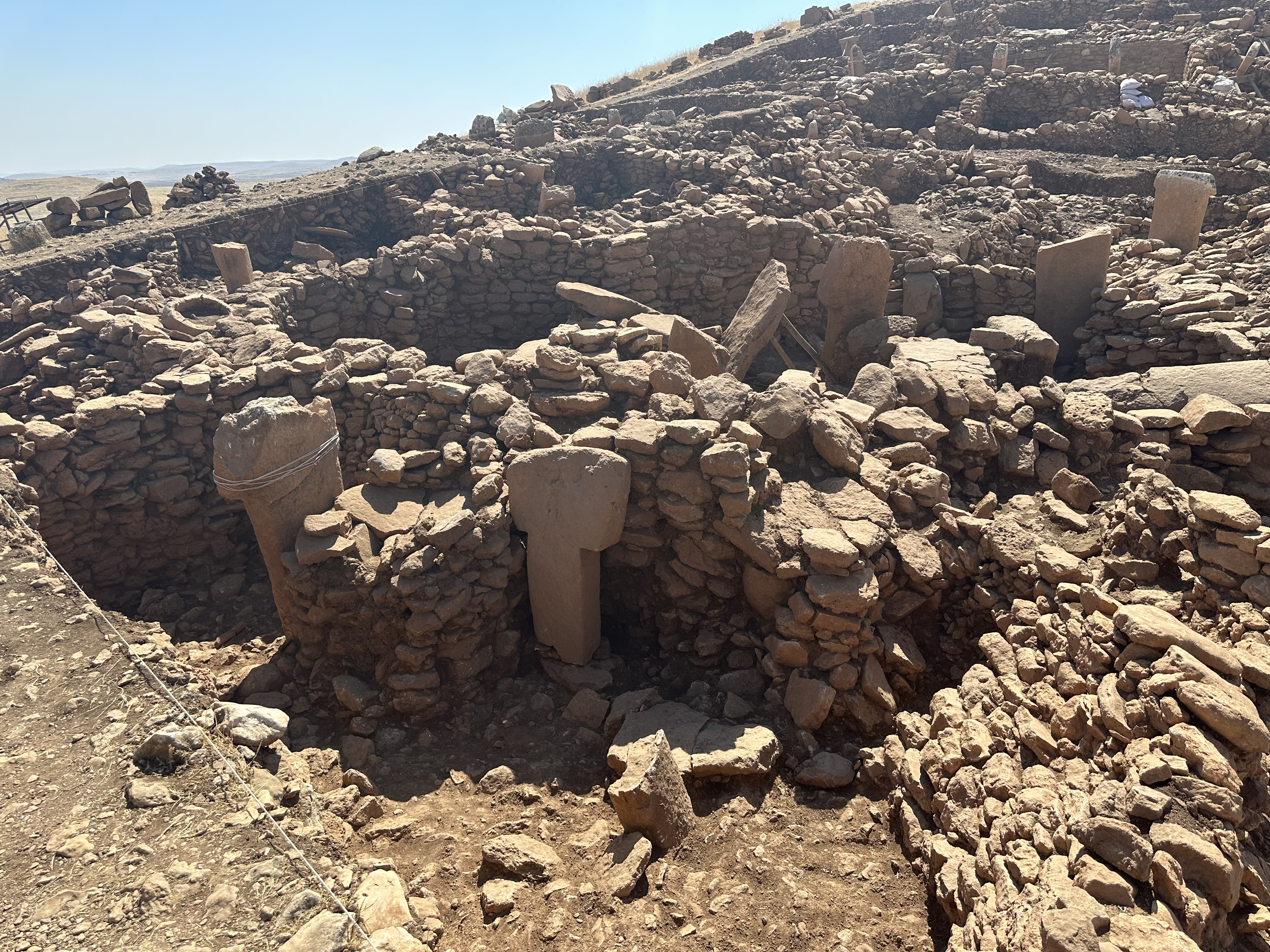

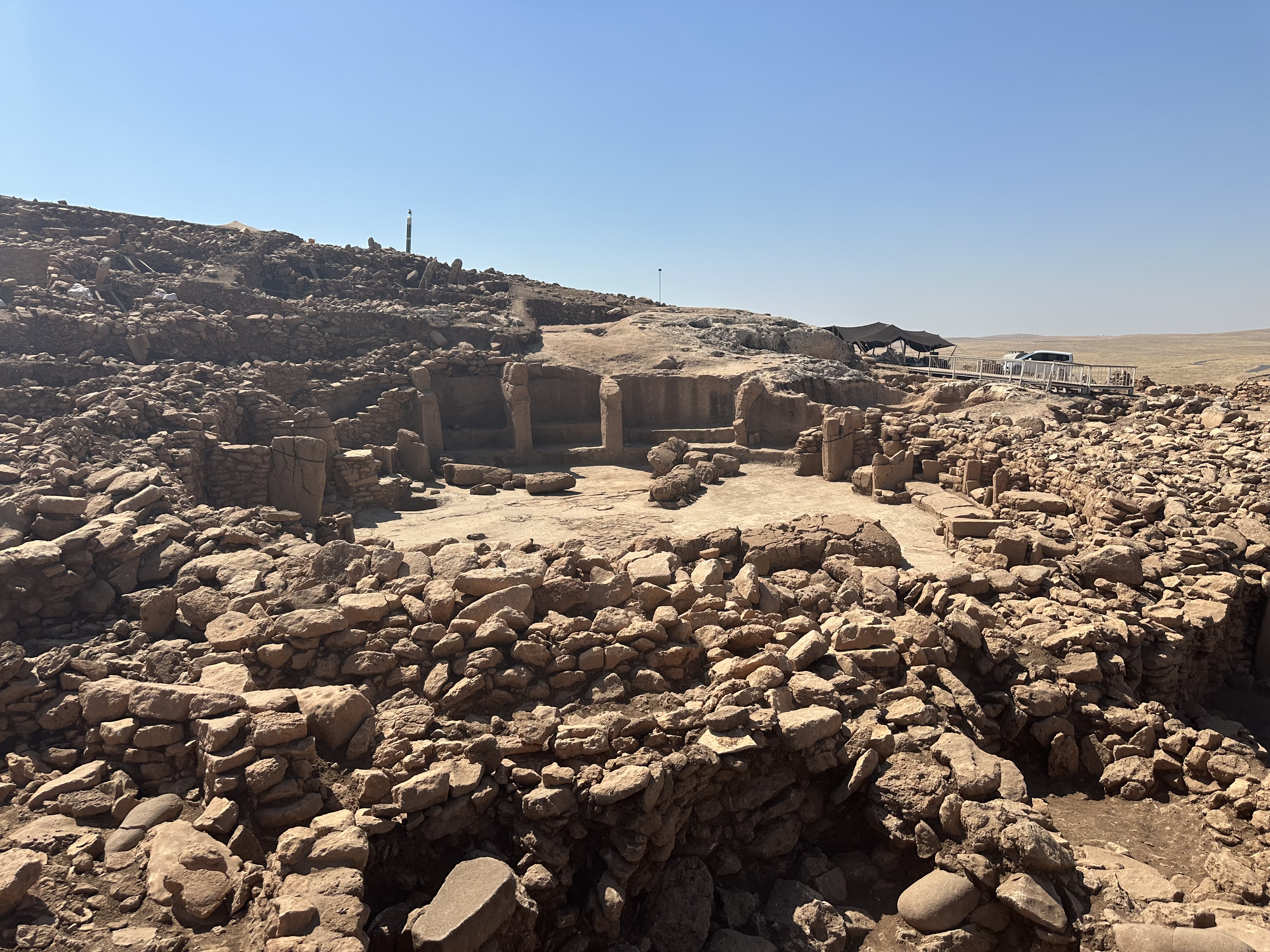

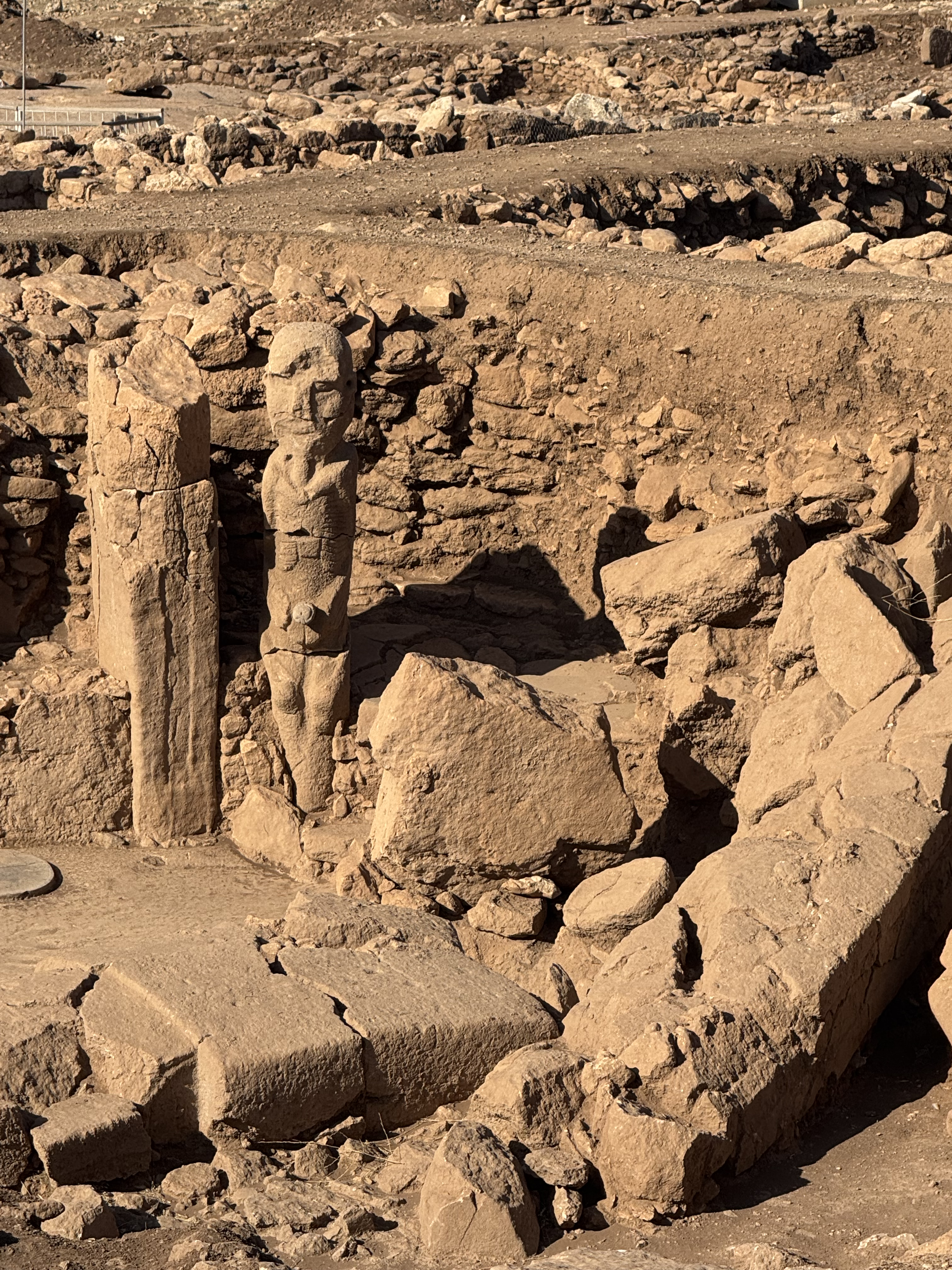

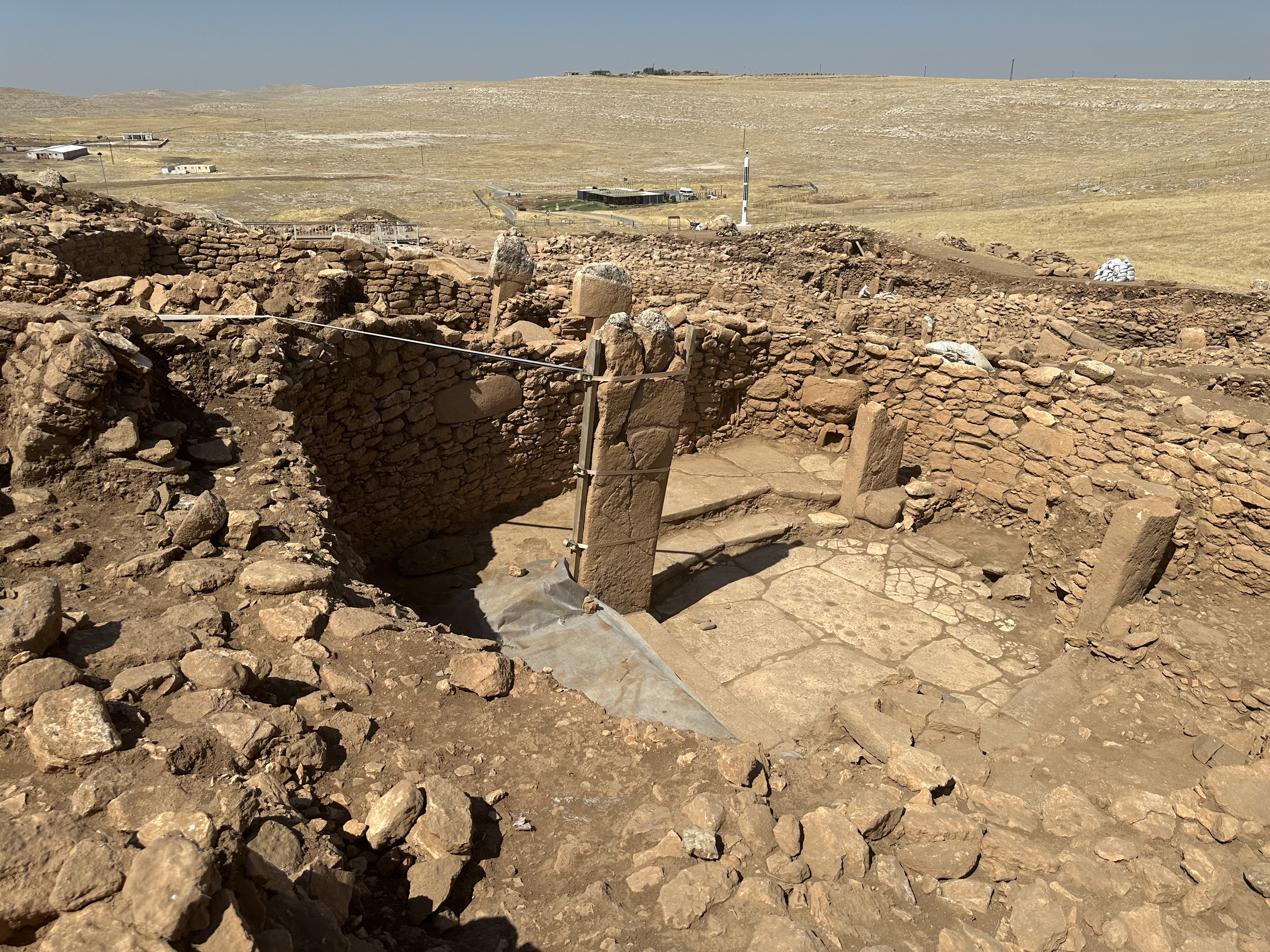

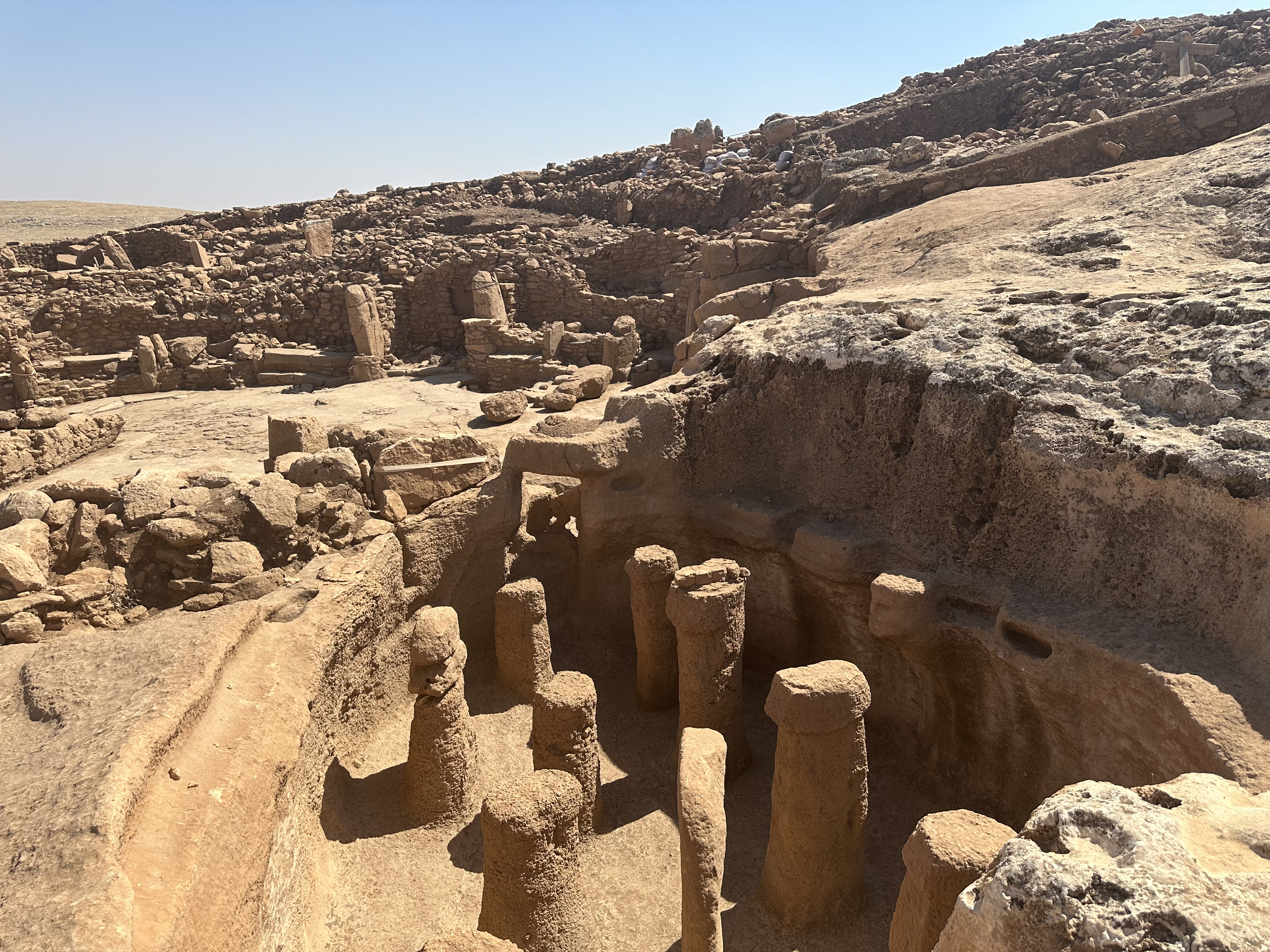

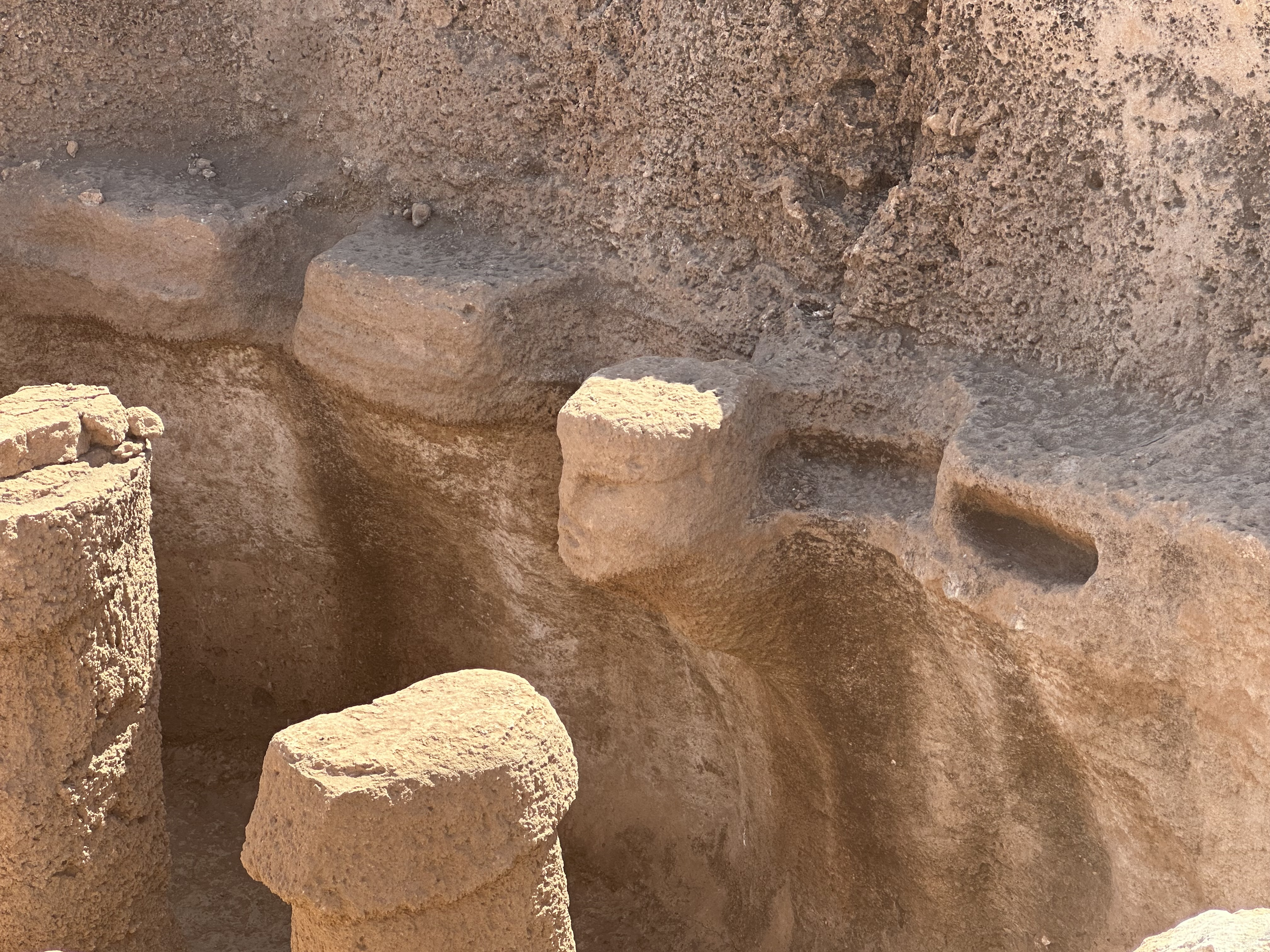

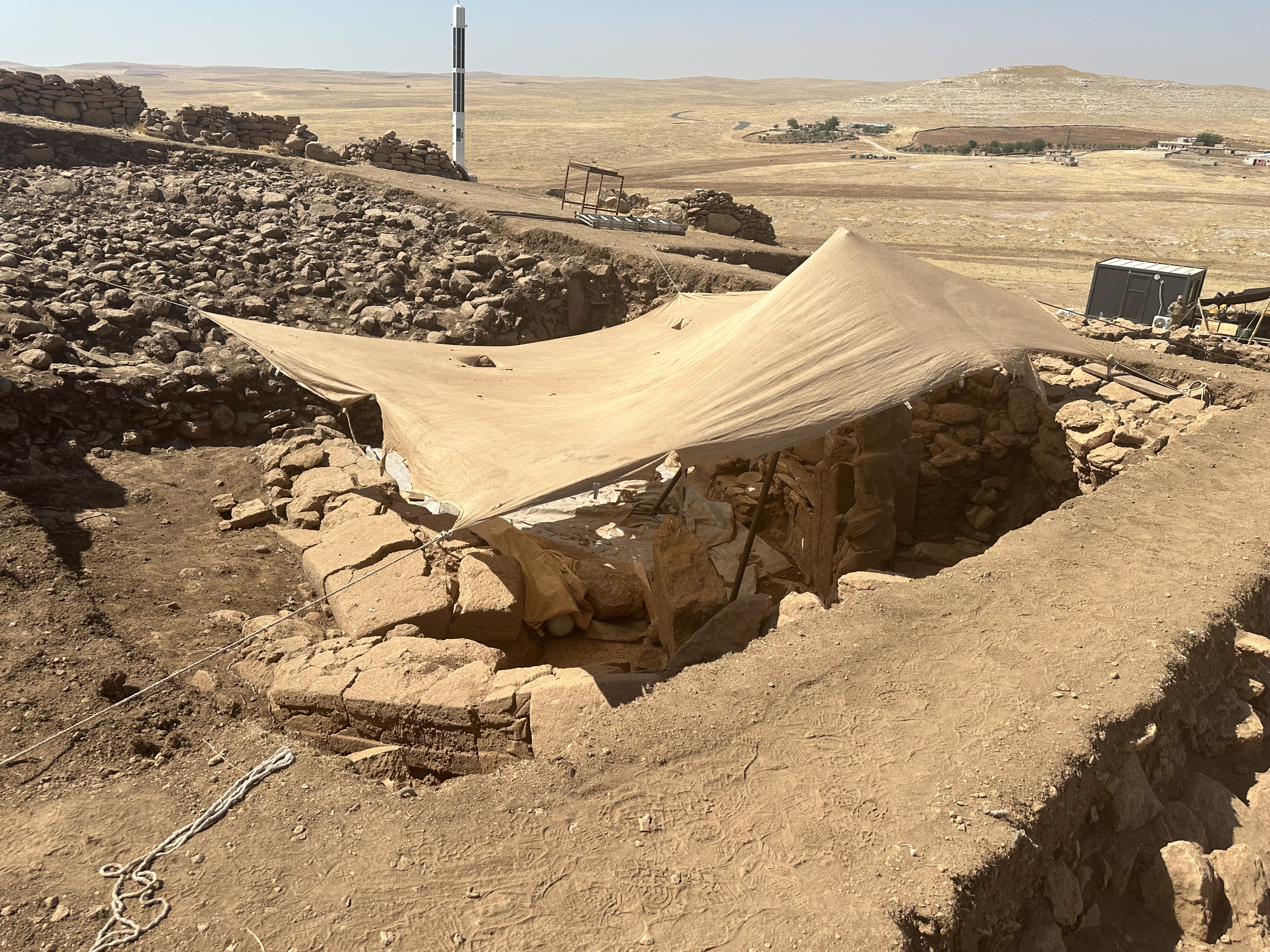

== See also ==
- Boncuklu Tarla
- Gürcütepe – Archaeological site in Turkey
- List of largest monoliths
- Prehistoric religion – Religion before written records
