= Monterey Institute of International Studies at Soka University of America =

International affairs institute located in Monterey, California

Monterey Institute of International Studies
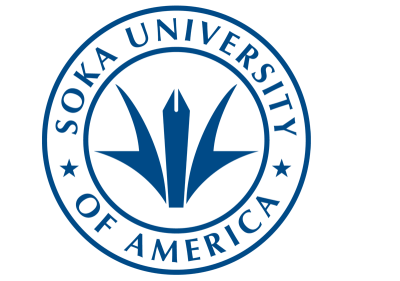
- Logo of Soka University of America
- Former names: Middlebury Institute of International Studies at Monterey (2015–2026); Monterey Institute of International Studies (1979–2015); Monterey Institute of Foreign Studies (1955–1979)
- Type: Private graduate institute
- Established: June 9, 1955
- Parent institution: Soka University of America
- Affiliations: TPC
- Vice-president: Jeff Dayton-Johnson
- Faculty: 70 full time; 70 adjunct
- Postgraduates: 750
- Location: Monterey, California, U.S. 36.59932656720151°N 121.89697922474039°W
- Campus: Urban
- Colors: blue and white
- Website: www.middlebury.edu/institute

Established in 1955, the Monterey Institute of International Studies (MIIS) (formerly known as the Middlebury Institute of International Studies at Monterey (MIIS), the Monterey Institute of International Studies (MIIS), and the Monterey Institute of Foreign Studies (MIFS), is a graduate institute. Since 2026, it belongs to the Soka University of America. It is located in Monterey, California. For brevity, it is often referred to as simply the Monterey Institute.

The cofounders of the institute were Gaspard Etienne Weiss, Louise Weiss, Dwight Morrow Jr., Remsen Dubois Bird, Enid Hamilton-Fellows, Countess of Kinnoull, Sybil Fearnley, Noël Sullivan, and Frank Elton. The institute offers master's degree programs and certificates.

MIIS has been the official supplier of translators and interpreters to the Olympic Games since the 1984 Summer Olympics. Professors and alumni have also served as Chief interpreters and Chief translators for Olympic Games around the world since 1984. MIFS was the 2nd-ever school in the United States to establish a training program in Translation and Interpretation (T&I), following George Washington University by only 8 years. MIFS was the first, and for over a decade the only, school in the United States with a program in conference interpretation. MIFS was the first-ever school based in the United States to train translators and interpreters for work at the United Nations and the United Nations Interpretation Service, prior to which all were trained abroad. MIIS is today also the last remaining school of conference interpretation for three Asian languages left in the United States. MIIS is presently the only school in the United States under a Memorandum of Understanding with the United Nations to provide training for UN language officials.

In August 2025, Middlebury College President Ian Baucum announced that due to budgetary considerations and declining enrollment, MIIS would cease operation of its residential translation and interpreting graduate programs in June 2027. Some of its online programs as well as its self-sustaining research centers remain in operation under the Middlebury College umbrella. In May 2026, Soka University of America announced that they were in discussions with Middlebury College to purchase the MIIS campus and some of its academic programs. In August 2026, the purchase went through.

Flags of some home countries of students at the Middlebury Institute, lining the outside of an academic building on campus.

== History ==
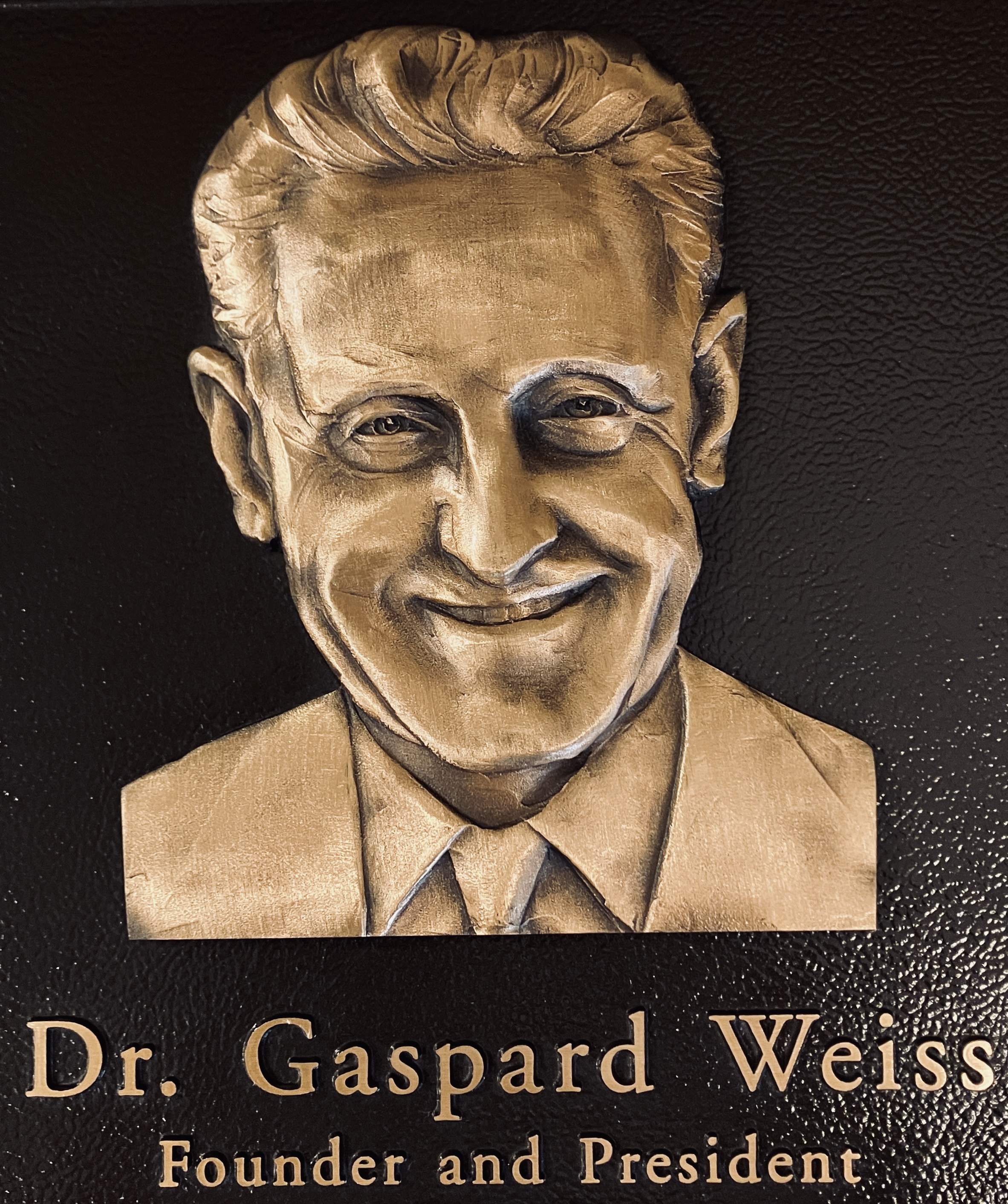
MIFS was the brainchild of Gaspard Weiss, formerly an instructor at the Army Language School who had been a spy during the Second World War.

=== The Creation of the Monterey Institute of Foreign Studies (1953-1955) ===
During the planning stages of the Monterey Institute of Foreign Studies (MIFS), attitudes on the Monterey Peninsula reflected the era: it was the height of the Cold War, and the area was a center of military and espionage activity. Only ten years before, the United Nations Charter had been signed in San Francisco, in the presence of a number of persons who would be affiliated with the Institute.

The Institute's founders came from an array of espionage and military backgrounds. MIFS was established as the brainchild of Gaspard Etienne Weiss, who in the early 1950s was employed by the Sixth Army as chairman of the French Department at the Army Language School, located at the Presidio of Monterey, which crests a hilltop overlooking the Monterey Peninsula. In 1952 Weiss and his wife Louise were the subjects of gossip that shook the Language School; the 6th Army Command investigated rumors that during World War II they may have fed intelligence to the Nazis during their service as propagandists for the French Interior Minister. In 1953 they were transferred to the languages department at Robert Louis Stevenson High School (RLSH) in Pebble Beach, California. Weiss taught Latin, and Louise taught French.

The German teacher at RLSH was Sybil Fearnley, who had graduated shortly before the outbreak of the war from Berlin University, in English and the teaching of German to foreigners. The Weisses and Sybil Fearnley had many conversations about developing a postgraduate school on the Monterey Peninsula.

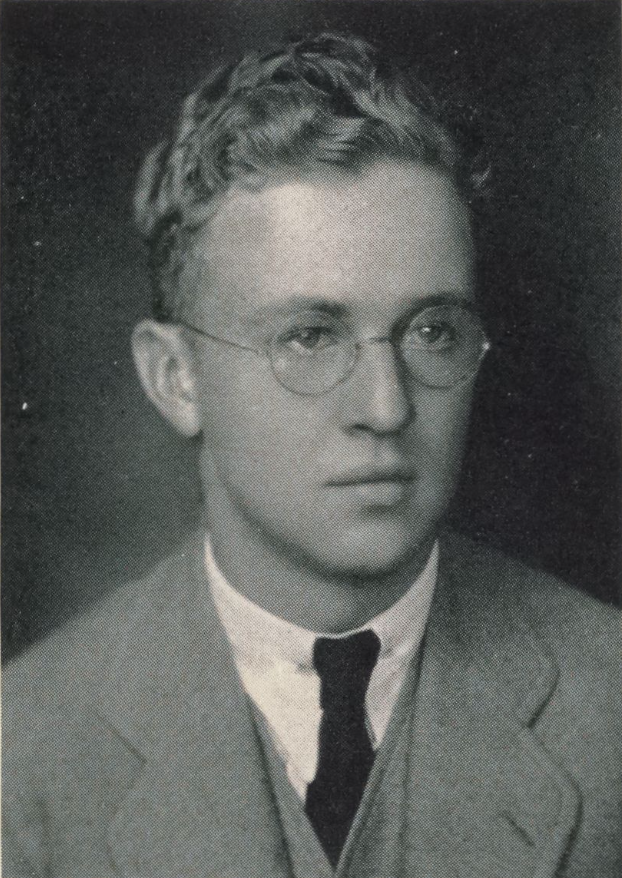
Dwight Morrow Jr. was Charles Lindbergh's stepbrother.

Two experts in pedagogy and the development, management, and operation of modern universities who were involved in establishing the school were Remsen Dubois Bird and Dwight Morrow Jr.. Remsen Bird had been the youngest President of Occidental College, seeing that College through the Great Depression and both World Wars. Morrow, the son of the former U.S. ambassador to Mexico and brother-in-law of Charles Lindbergh, was a world-renowned educator. He had convinced Weiss to move to California. Bird became the founding Chairman of the Board; there is a bust of him in the lobby at McCone Hall. Morrow served with him on the Board for many years, even while taking a teaching position on the East Coast.

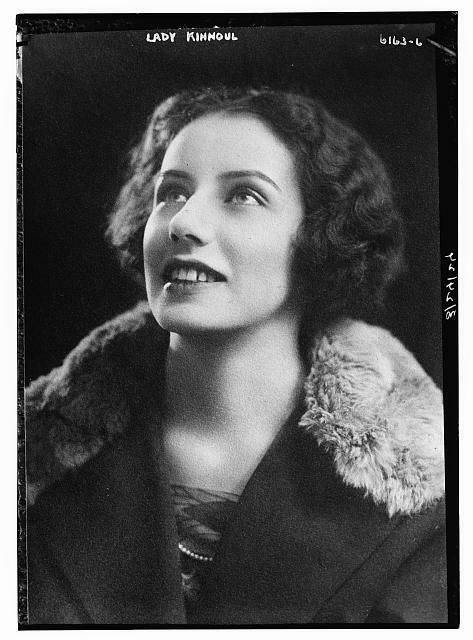
The Countess of Kinnoull, who had been a spy during World War II, provided much financial backing for the Institute's initial programs.

Frank Elton was a South-African-born British diplomat living in Carmel Valley, associated with the British General Consulate in San Francisco. He was also involved in managing the San Francisco chapter of the World Affairs Council, until he oversaw the 1955 establishment of a new chapter of the organization in the Monterey Bay Area. His position as head of the British Economic Service in San Francisco allowed the Institute to quickly develop a connection with the business world. He became an educator at MIFS while also serving as president of the British-American Council for Economic Affairs in San Francisco and participating in elite men's clubs in that city.

Though Morrow and Elton had mad large donations to the Institute, two primary financial backers were the Countess of Kinnoull and Noël Sullivan. Kinnoull had been involved in the Catholic Nationalist movement during the Spanish Civil War as the official press photographer for the Vatican and for Francisco Franco. She had spied on communists in France for MI6 shortly before fleeing the country in 1940, settling in the United States, and becoming a large philanthropic donor throughout the area of Monterey and Carmel. Speaking several languages herself, she was keen on seeing California become a center of civilian language instruction. Sullivan, who had also established the Carmel Music Society, died of a heart attack about a year into the success of its first program.

The primary desire of the Institute's founders was to create a spinoff of the kinds of language instruction at the Presidio, but for civilian students, with a different style of language immersion than any other program's. They did not want the program to be one where "the book is on the table."

=== Summer Language Seminars (1955-1961) ===
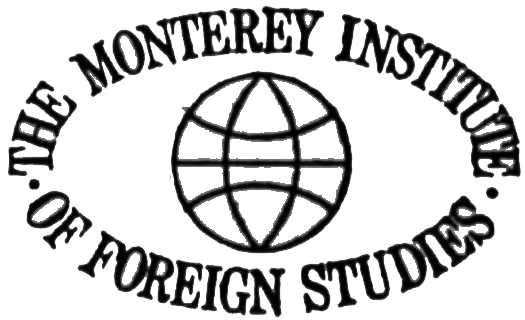
Original logo of the Monterey Institute of Foreign Studies

When the doors of MIFS opened in on June 9, 1955, there were 13 students, and the only two subjects taught that year were in the languages and cultures of French and German. The initial programs, called "Summer Seminars," were intensive summer language programs, held annually, for students currently attending other universities. What separated this program from those of other similar programs of the era, such as the summer language programs at Middlebury College, was that the programs here were not designed to be only those of language instruction, but were also structured to teach courses on foreign cultures and areas exclusively in that language. By the fourth year of the program in 1958, the languages offered had evolved to include Italian, Spanish, and Russian. Remsen Bird, in a letter to the CIA director Allen Dulles in 1958, wrote that the institute was "directed to the job of teaching languages for use and the understanding of the other civilizations." An advertisement appearing in The Stanford Daily recruiting students for the fourth annual summer session reads:

"The courses are presented exclusively in the language of each country by native-born instructors. In addition, the institute offers a workshop for the teaching of French and Spanish in elementary grades. Comparative History, Comparative Law and Government, and International Economics comprise an integrated approach to understanding the socio-economic and political structure of the Western world. Courses in Asiatic Civilization are also offered."

When the institute started these programs, it had no permanently owned buildings, only a post office box, and held its summer courses in buildings in the area of Monterey County. When it began in 1955, it occupied 4 rooms at the Monterey Peninsula College, and lectures that year were held in the Theatre-in-the-Round, in the city of Carmel, located roughly 5 miles away from downtown Monterey, on the other side of the Monterey Peninsula. After its first year, the institute was housed mainly at the Mission of San Carlos Borromeo, also in Carmel. Students lived in small group "dormitories," often in groups as small as 10 students and often with an instructor living in the building. The instructors lived in the buildings to ensure that only the language of instruction was spoken during the length of the summer.

Despite the fact that at this initial stage they had no official campus and were only a summer language program, the vision of the institute founders was indeed that the institute would become a true graduate professional center with a core focus and mission dedicated to programs beyond their core classes of language instruction and cultural understanding. Throughout the second half of the 1950s, as the Chair of the Board, Remsen Bird started forming relationships with other universities and nongovernmental institutions to convince their leadership to start sending students to the summer programs. Included in this relationship were representatives of the Christian Science Monitor and the University of California, Berkeley. By 1960, the institute was offering an 11-week beginners course in languages that lasted 5 hours a day for 6 days a week.

=== Period of expansion (1961-1979) ===
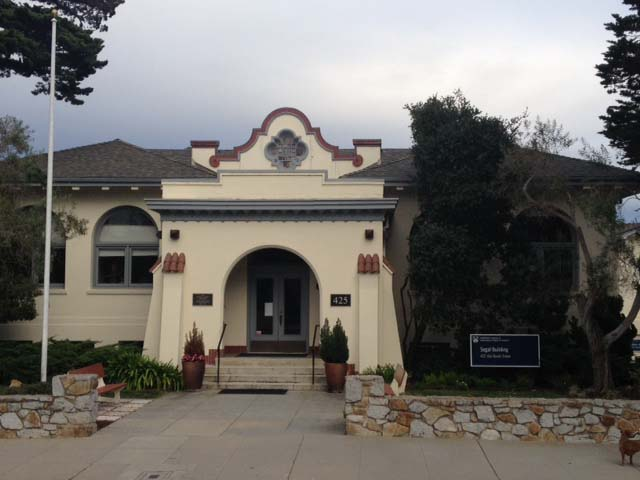
The Barnet J. Segal Building, also known as the Old Monterey Public Library, or the Old Carnegie Library, was the first building purchased by MIFS. It was built in the style of Mission Revival architecture.

1961 saw the introduction of year-round degree programs taught at MIFS. The first building that the institute acquired was the Barnet J. Segal Building, also known as the Old Monterey Carnegie Library building, which was originally the city's public library. The institute was soon accredited by the Western Association of Schools and Colleges, categorized as a "Liberal Arts Institution." Samuel Finley Brown Morse was instrumental in the purchase, underwriting the school's loan to buy the building. As President of the Monterey Peninsula Foundation, Morse also arranged for the distribution of major grant funds to the school for investments and expansion.

One of the first faculty members brought in around this time, and an instructor in the German language, was Samson Benjamin Knoll. Knoll was born in the Austrian Empire, but spent most of his life in Germany. He was educated at the University of Berlin from 1930 to 1933. Throughout the late 1930s, Knoll had been a language instructor at various universities in the United States. Notably, in 1938, Knoll was quoted as saying that he believed the people of his country would rise up and overthrow Hitler. That didn't happen, and during the Second World War, Knoll was assigned to US Army Intelligence on the Western Front, and it was one of his primary duties to interview Allied prisoners of war that had either escaped or had been released by the Nazis. During the early 1950s, while serving as a language instructor at Stanford, Knoll returned to Europe to lead tours of the music history of Central Europe. By 1968, Knoll was serving as the Chancellor of MIFS.

By the year 1965, the school had developed programs for a Bachelor of Arts and a Master of Arts in languages and civilizations, and in the political arts. The summer sessions that year had also expanded to include full 10-week programs for undergraduates, and shorter 7-week programs for only for graduate students.

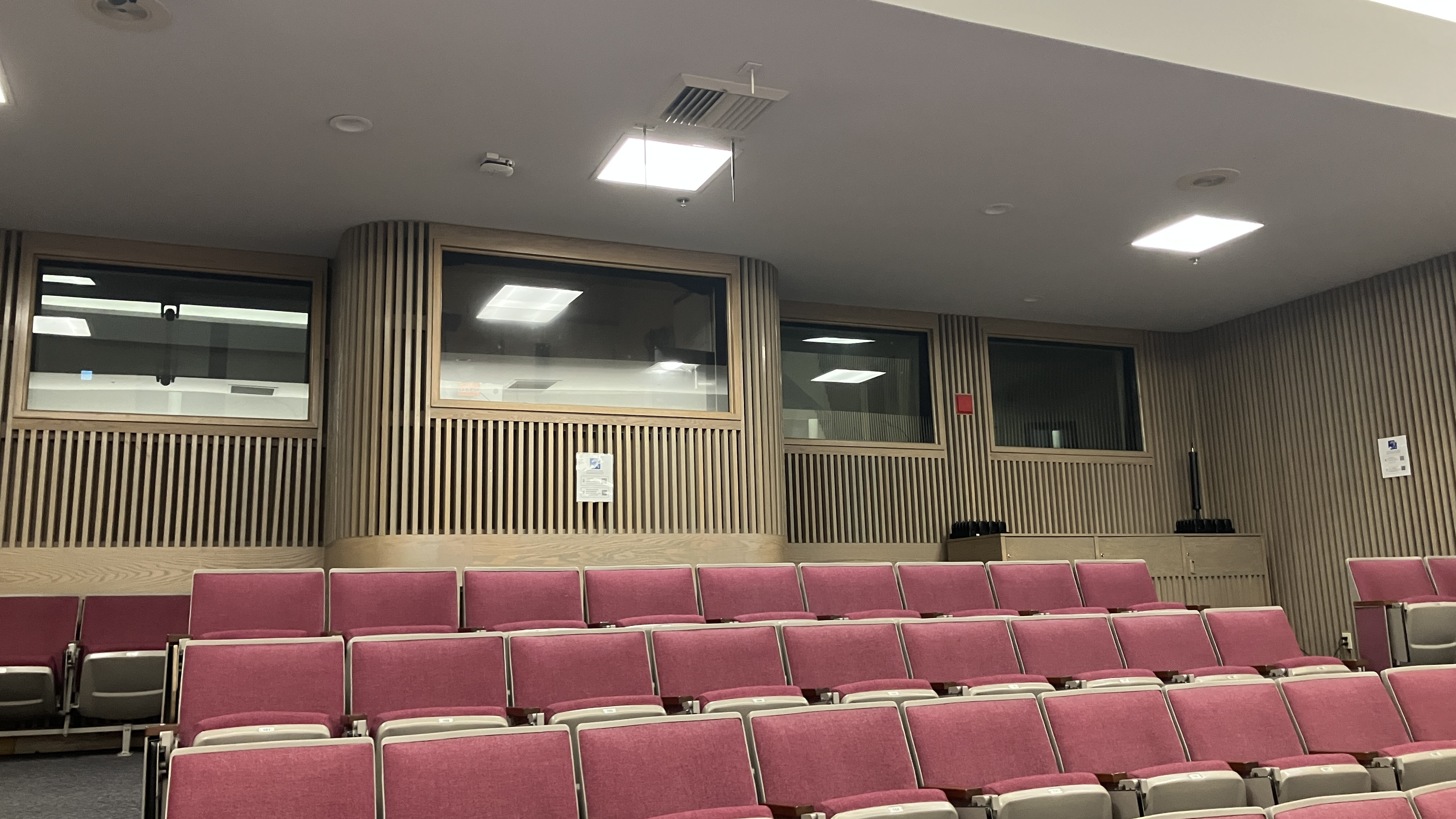
Interpretation booths on the inside of the Irvine Auditorium

In 1968, the department of Translation and Interpretation (T&I) was initiated in order to provide training in written and oral interpretation, both in simultaneous and consecutive. Prior to 1968, all UN translators and those of other related international organizations were trained elsewhere, primarily in Europe. The 200 seat Irvine Auditorium was designed specifically to be modeled after the UN's General Assembly, complete with several booths in the back of the room slotted for translators and interpreters.

In 1968, when Samuel Finley Brown Morse was on his deathbed, he arranged in his will that MIFS would receive a third of his vast fortunes. However, he stipulated that this money would not be distributed until all of his children had died. Most of his children remained involved with the school through the 1970s and '80s. The disbursement did not occur until 2018, when the $4.5 million loan was accepted by MIIS Vice President Jeff Dayton-Johnson.

By 1969, MIFS was teaching language and area courses in Arabic, Chinese, French, German, Italian, Japanese, Portuguese, Russian, and Spanish. MIFS was also teaching courses in history, international economics, political science, language education, translation and interpretation.

In 1969, Fulton H. Freeman left his post as the US Ambassador to Mexico to become the President of MIFS. He was described by the Associated Press at the time as a "jazz-playing, cigar-smoking extrovert." In his going-away ceremony, he was awarded the Order of the Aztec Eagle by the Mexican government. Several years before taking his post, Freeman suggested a program called Training for Service Abroad (TSA) designed to simulate for business and other professionals the same kinds of courses that were taught to members of the US Foreign Service. After becoming President of the institute, he lobbied heavily and created the program. Freeman held his position until 1974, when he died suddenly at the age of 59.

The major funding model through the 1970s was to push the TSA program on corporate America, and it did indeed draw many students from the professional class. The TSA program had become the centerpiece of MIIS language instruction. This program emphasized grammar and vocabulary, but also stressed education in cultural practices, social etiquette, and professional norms relevant to the student’s corporate assignment abroad. Instruction was highly individualized, often arranged around the student’s corporate schedule, and incorporated immersion techniques such as meals in restaurants and role-playing of social or business situations. Corporate tuition fees for the TSA program were substantial, but many multinational firms supported the training as a safeguard against failed postings abroad, which could cost employers significantly more. The faculty involved in the program declared that language training provided insight into social structures as well as communication skills, with the aim of reducing culture shock and improving the effectiveness of overseas assignments.

In 1970, tuition started suffering from a phenomenon of massive inflation. The price for tuition at 4,000 USD was one of the highest rates in the country, falling just behind the highest tuition in the country, Middlebury College.

In the year 1973, the school had 360 upper division and graduate students with an average age of 29.

=== Monterey Institute of International Studies ===
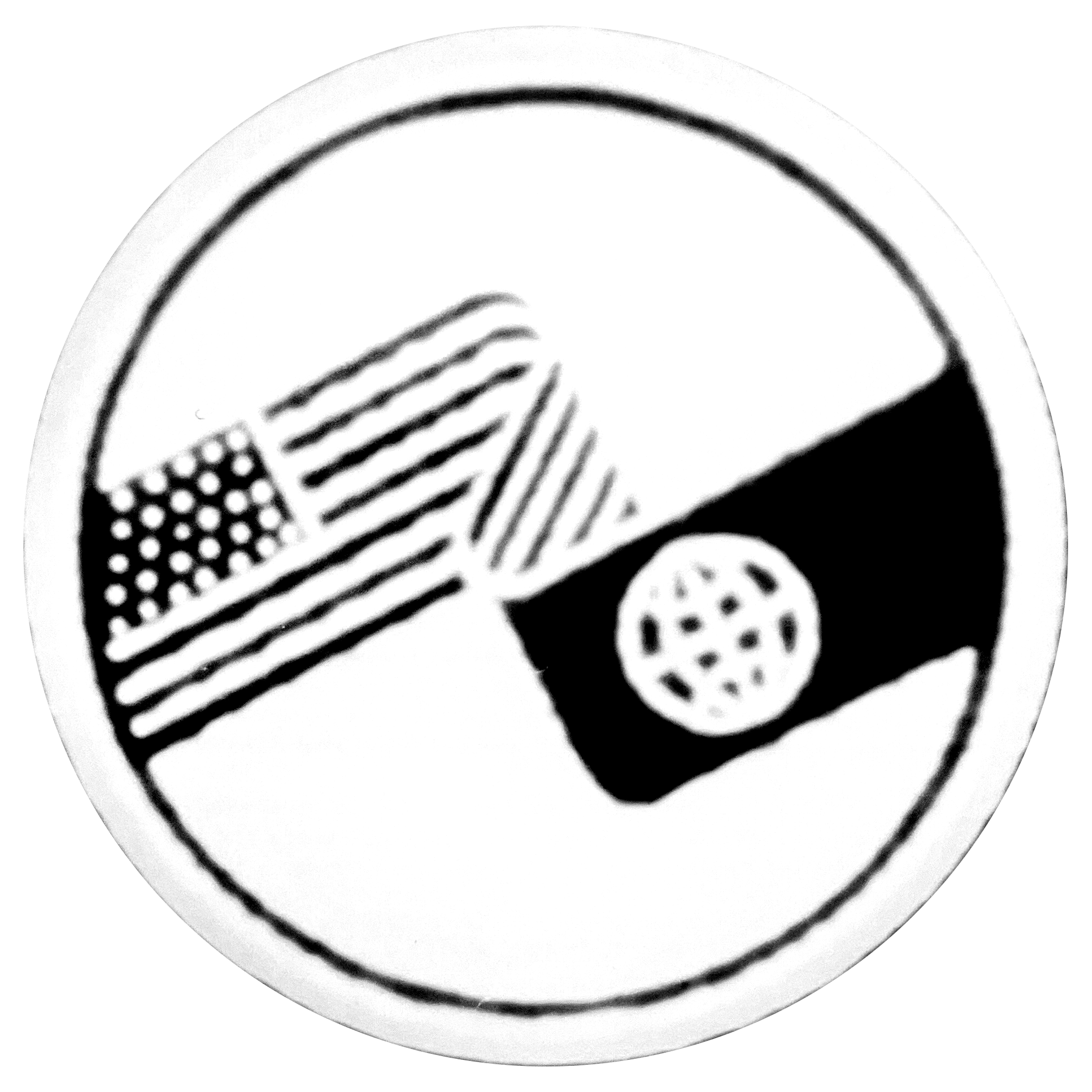
In 1979, the Monterey Institute of Foreign Studies changed its name to the Monterey Institute of International Studies. They used this logo until 2005, when they were affiliated officially with Middlebury College.

In 1979, the MIFS changed its name to the Monterey Institute of International Studies.

In the 1980, a representative from the American Cattleman's Association approached Lee Cagwin, the director of language programs at MIIS, and said that he desired to be able to communicate effectively with business associates in Latin America. Cagwin and MIIS then designed a Spanish program aimed specifically at the local Californian farming and ranching community. The goal of the program was to create farmers that knew how to speak Spanish in order to communicate effectively with their cattle farmhands and migratory field workers coming up from Mexico for the picking seasons. In this program, there were never more than 5 students per course. Tuition for this program cost $3,650, ran for six weeks, five days a week, 6 hours a day. Something that the ranchers and farmers might have been unused to in their professional lives was two to three hours of homework per night. After farmers and ranchers went through the program, they reported that their respect for their employees had grown.

In 1991-1992, MIIS was at the center of a Congressional spending scandal that was outside its own control. In 1991, Democratic members of Congress considered adding $6.8 million in grant funding for MIIS to the Military budget of the United States, for the stated purpose of funding a Center of International Trade Enhancement, which would be designed to train government translators and other officials. However, Representative Dan Burton, a Republican, called the notion "pure, unadulterated pork," and launched a campaign to kill the grant. In March 1992, President George H. W. Bush sent his own revisions to the budget back to Congress, with the allocation for MIIS removed entirely, alongside a third of the entire defense budget. In the fall of 1992, Leon Panetta, chair of the House Budget Committee, then placed $6.8 million in grant money for MIIS into the language of an emergency spending bill designed for the victims of Hurricane Andrew.

In December 1995, Jonathan B. Tucker, a research specialist in chemical weapons, was dismissed from his role on the Presidential Advisory Committee on Gulf War Veterans' Illnesses, a special White House panel dedicated to discovering the cause of Gulf War syndrome and other illnesses experienced by veterans. The committee at the time refused to comment on why he was dismissed. The committee published their findings that illnesses suffered by veterans were not caused by chemical weapons used during the Gulf War. In 1996, Tucker secured his position at MIIS as the director of the Chemical and Biological Weapons Nonproliferation Program at the Center for Nonproliferation studies. In April 1997, however, Tucker testified before the House Government Reform Committee and provided evidence that Iraq had most likely used chemical weapons during the war against US troops. He also said that he had been ordered by the committee not to talk to any Gulf War veterans or others who may have been exposed to chemical weapons in order to secure proper medical treatment for them.

In 1997, the institute became the first professional graduate school in the world to offer a master's degree in International Environmental Policy.

Following the September 11 attacks, and the Patriot Act that followed, attendance at MIIS began to drop dramatically. Admissions steadily declined during the Presidency of George W. Bush, especially in students applying from other countries, and the institute started to worry that its finances would be unable to recover. Especially approaching the 2004 Fiscal Crisis of California, the institute was in a budget deficit by 2003.

== Relationship to the Olympic Games ==
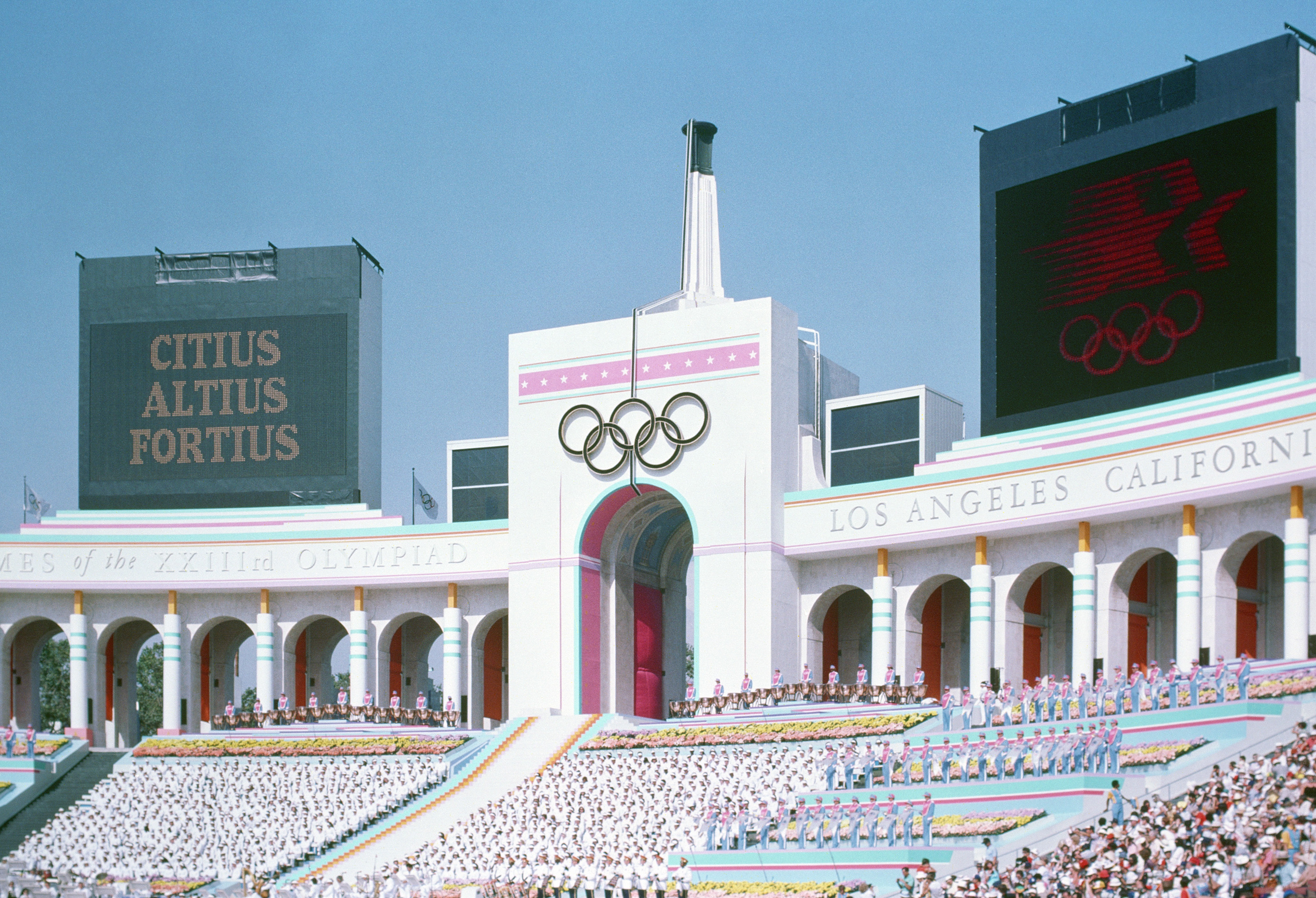
The "Olympic Torch Tower" of the Los Angeles Coliseum on the day of the opening ceremonies of the 1984 Summer Olympics. MIIS provided over 30 students as translators and interpreters for these games, and their Chief interpreter was a MIIS professor.

In 1984, William Weber, dean of the Graduate School of Translation and Interpretation at MIIS at the time, arranged an academic internship for 32 students of translation and interpretation to work at the 1984 Summer Olympics. Therein, the relationship between the two institutions was secured, and MIIS was known as the "official supplier of translation and interpretation services" for the games. The students assigned to that year's Olympics worked as translators of official documents, and simultaneous interpreters in English and French for the main Olympic press center.

The relationship has become so entwined over the years that MIIS was given the honor of occasionally using the Olympic symbols on its stationary. For over 30 years, the director of translation and interpretation services was William Weber, a language professor at MIIS. His predecessor, Alexandre Pomonarev, who has been the most recent Chief interpreter for the Olympics, including the games in Tokyo 2020 and Paris 2024, is a graduate of MIIS. He is currently the Chief Interpreter for the International Olympic Committee. Daniel Glon, another language professor at MIIS, served as the Chief Translator for the 2002 Winter Olympics.

== Connection with Middlebury College ==
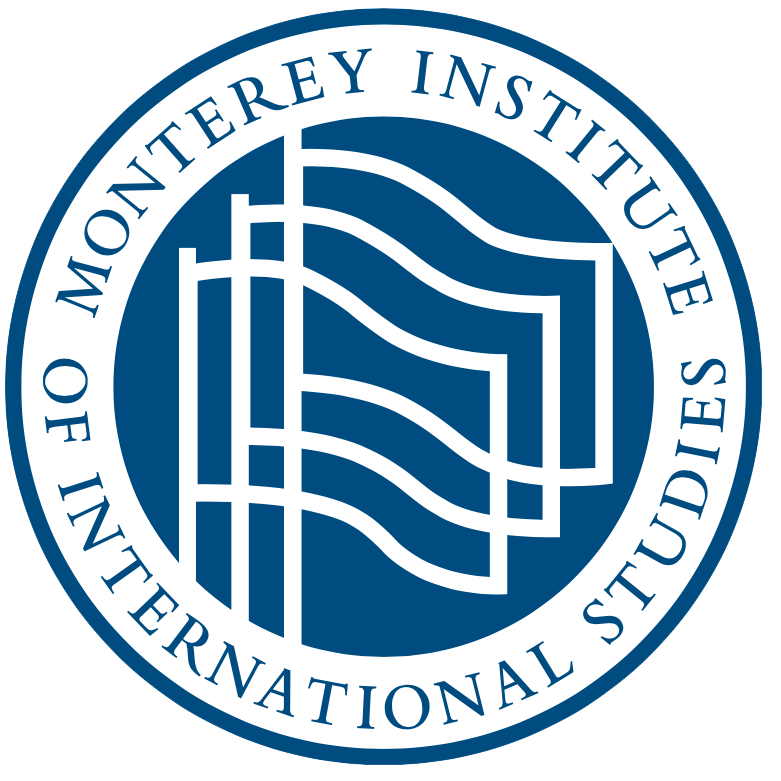
Logo of the Monterey Institute of International Studies, used from 2005 to 2015.

=== Background ===
The leadership of Middlebury College, a private "Little Ivy" in the town of Middlebury, Vermont, started to have desires to become a more globally-focused and internationally renowned college at the tail-end of the nineteenth century, almost a hundred years after its founding in the year 1800. The first major endeavor into becoming this kind of international institution was the establishment of the Middlebury Language Schools with its first summer language school in German being in the year 1915. By 2002, Middlebury College, operated nine intensive summer language schools in Arabic, Chinese, French, German, Italian, Japanese, Portuguese, Russian, and Spanish. These language schools brought about 1,300 students to its Vermont campuses each year.

Despite the fact that Monterey's language programs began almost exactly a half-century after the first language school at Middlebury, the Monterey Institute was much quicker to develop and offer a wider range of language programs. Monterey's Arabic program in 1969, for example, began 13 years before Middlebury's Arabic School in 1982. As the two programs grew on opposite sides of the country, throughout the decades, the language schools at MIIS and Middlebury College were often mentioned together as the premier language programs in the country, and operated in a healthy environment of direct competition. They did not have many other competitors. For example, in a 1974 letter in response to an inquiry from Jenise Cook about which language schools might be preferable, the Deputy Director of the Central Intelligence Agency at the time, Vernon A. Walters wrote:

"I was very interested to know of your interest in languages. The world in which we live grows smaller every day and the ability to communicate grows in importance... I have heard of the Monterey Institute of Foreign Study and everything I have heard of it has been good. At Monterey, also, is the Defense Language Institute (for the Armed Forces only), a really superb school. Middlebury also has a very good reputation."

Middlebury College's other main endeavor in expanding its global reach was by expanding its international footprint with a program called the C.V. Starr-Middlebury Schools Abroad. This program began in the year 1949 with a Middlebury graduate degree program at a university in Paris. By 2002, Middlebury Schools Abroad had sites in China, France, Germany, Italy, Russia, and Spain. In 2002, through a partnership with SUNY Plattsburgh, the program added seven additional locations in Argentina, Uruguay, Brazil, and Mexico. The agreement also allowed Middlebury students to access additional universities in South America through SUNY Plattsburgh’s Southern Cone program. In addition to the Middlebury Schools Abroad, about 500 students annually attended the Bread Loaf School of English in Ripton, Vermont, which maintained additional teaching sites in Alaska, New Mexico, and Oxford, England.

=== MIIS financial difficulties (2003-2005) ===
In 2003, MIIS was suffering from a major budget deficit and was on the verge of financial collapse. MIIS sought an institutional partner due to these financial difficulties, believing that becoming part of a larger network would allow the institute to continue operations. Initial discussions took place with the University of California. M.R.C. Greenwood, Chancellor of the University of California, Santa Cruz, announced that negotiations were underway between the two schools. However, those talks ended in November 2004 during a period of fiscal crisis in California, after which negotiations with Middlebury College began. The UC system eventually recovered after the passage of Proposition 57 and Proposition 58, but by then, the relationship with Middlebury was already being finalized.

Due to the similarities in the programs of Monterey and Middlebury, the general thinking in the leadership of Middlebury College at the time was that MIIS had developed a range of international programs that complemented Middlebury’s academic priorities. At this time, MIIS graduated a class of roughly 300 students representing 37 countries. Middlebury, which was over two centuries old, produced about twice as many graduates annually and enrolled undergraduates from more than 80 nations. International studies had become one of Middlebury’s principal academic goals, alongside language and literary studies, writing, and environmental studies. Unlike many private U.S. undergraduate institutions, Middlebury also offered financial aid to its international students.

The faculty of Middlebury College at the time, however, disagreed greatly with the decisions of leadership at the College. At a Faculty Council meeting on April 1, 2005, a paper ballot election was held on the question of the acquisition. The final vote count was 80 to 21, in favor of not pursuing the relationship any further. The President of Middlebury College at the time, Ronald D. Liebowitz, decided to go ahead with discussions anyway.

=== Affiliation with Middlebury (2005-2015) ===
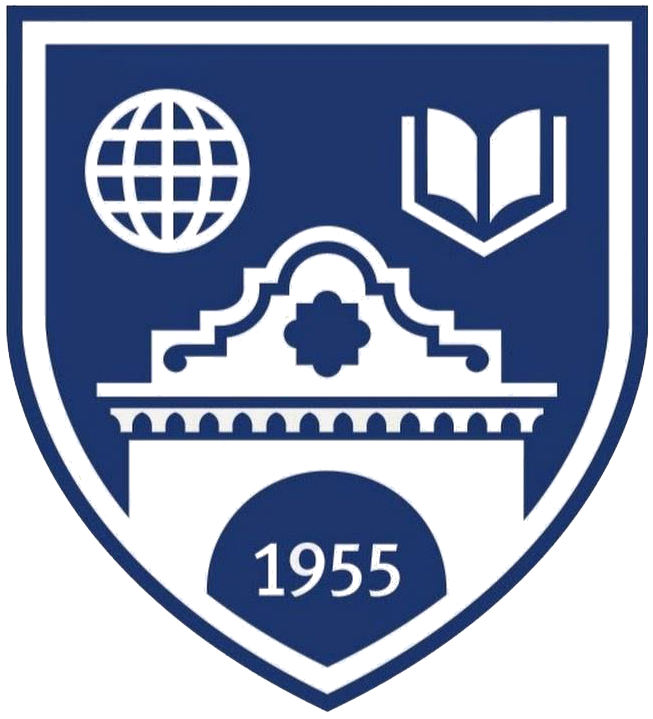
Logo used since 2015. The building featured in the logo is the Segal Building, the first building purchased by the institute.

On June 24, 2005, the trustees of Middlebury and MIIS jointly announced their approval of a letter of intent establishing Monterey as an affiliate of Middlebury, with a target date of December 23, 2005, for the completion of the arrangement. According to the agreement, MIIS would be overseen by a five-member board of trustees appointed by Middlebury. While the MIIS board retained general oversight, Middlebury reserved authority over presidential appointments or removals, budget approvals, property transactions, and the initiation or termination of academic programs.

Middlebury stated that it anticipated supporting MIIS financially through fundraising, designated gifts, and, if necessary, secured loans. The funding was intended for facility improvements, technology upgrades, admissions efforts, and development activities. Middlebury projected that financial support would be provided over four years, with the expectation that MIIS would become financially self-sustaining after the initial investment.

Middlebury's stated intent in the affiliation was that it was providing financial support for the struggling institution, but it also wanted direct access to the world-renowned language programs provided by MIIS. At the time, MIIS was the only institution in the entire Western Hemisphere offering graduate degrees in conference interpretation and in translation and interpretation for English-Chinese, English-Japanese, and English-Korean. MIIS also operated several research institutions at the time; the Center for International Trade Strategy, the Center for Nonproliferation Studies, the Center for Russian and Eurasian Studies, the Center for East Asian Studies, the Center for Language in Education and Work, and the International Interpretation Resource Center.

In December 2005, shortly after the 50th anniversary, Middlebury College and the Monterey Institute signed an affiliation agreement that established a formal relationship between the two institutions. Under that agreement, the Monterey Institute board of trustees was reconstituted to include 13 members, nine of them with Middlebury connections and four former members of the Monterey Institute board of trustees.

The nine new board members with connections to Middlebury were:

- James S. Davis, chairman and chief executive officer of New Balance Athletic Shoe
- Frederick M. Fritz, chair of the Middlebury College board of trustees
- Philip O. Geier, executive director of the Davis United World College Scholars Program
- David A. Jones, co-founder and chairman emeritus of Humana, Inc.
- William H. Kieffer III, former senior vice president of State Street Corporation
- Catherine Grace Lee, consultant to Eukor Car Carriers
- Russell J. Leng, Middlebury College James Jermain Professor of Political Economy and International Law
- Victor P. Micati, retired executive of Pfizer
- Marna C. Whittington, chief operating officer of Allianz Dresdner Asset Management

The four board members who previously served on the Monterey Institute board were:

- Beverly Lannquist Hamilton, former president of ARCO Investment Management Company
- Stephen McDonald, managing director of Trust Company of the West
- Bernard H. Schulte, senior advisor of John Parry & Alexander, Inc
- J.R. Williams, first vice president of Wachovia Securities

On September 11, 2007, Middlebury College announced the establishment of the Middlebury-Monterey Language Academy (MMLA), which catered to those described as "pre-college students." Michael Geisler, the vice president for Middlebury Language Schools, Schools Abroad and Graduate Programs at the time said that the MMLA would meet the demand of parents who had been asking him for an option to teach their children languages.

In June 2010, Middlebury College formalized its acquisition of the institute, which was formally designated A Graduate School of Middlebury College. The Monterey board of trustees was renamed the board of governors, and subsequently the board of overseers, with ultimate responsibility for the institute residing with the Middlebury Board of Trustees.

On January 7, 2015, Middlebury announced that the institute would become known as the Middlebury Institute of International Studies at Monterey. The name change was part of a general rebranding of Middlebury-affiliated institutions.

=== End of Residential Graduate Programs ===
On Aug. 28, 2025, Middlebury President Ian B. Baucomb published a letter stating that due to declining enrollment and income at MIIS, many MIIS graduate education programs would be terminated in 2027, with some online programs continuing. The timing allowed for current students to complete their degrees by June 2027 "with a full array of on-campus resources, including career services." In detail:

- Residential degree (master's) programs would come to an end.
- Online degree programs in International Education Management and in Teaching English to Speakers of Other Languages (TESOL) would end.
- Online degree programs in Cybersecurity, Localization Project Management, MPA in Sustainability, and Organizational Leadership would continue.
- Summer programs would continue through at least 2026, with decisions about further continuation to come at a later time.
- Self-sustaining centers would continue operation. In particular, the James Martin Center for Nonproliferation Studies (CNS), based in Monterey, would continue "under the greater Middlebury umbrella" in several locations including Monterey; Middlebury, Vermont; Washington, D.C.; and Vienna, Austria.

== Purchase by Soka University of America ==
In August 2026, MIIS was acquired by Soka University of America (SUA). SUA President Ed Feasel wrote that the current class of MIIS students studying under Middlebury would be allowed to continue their studies, and would still graduate with Middlebury degrees, but SUA now owns the physical campus. SUA will completely take over academic programs in Fall 2027.

== Academics ==
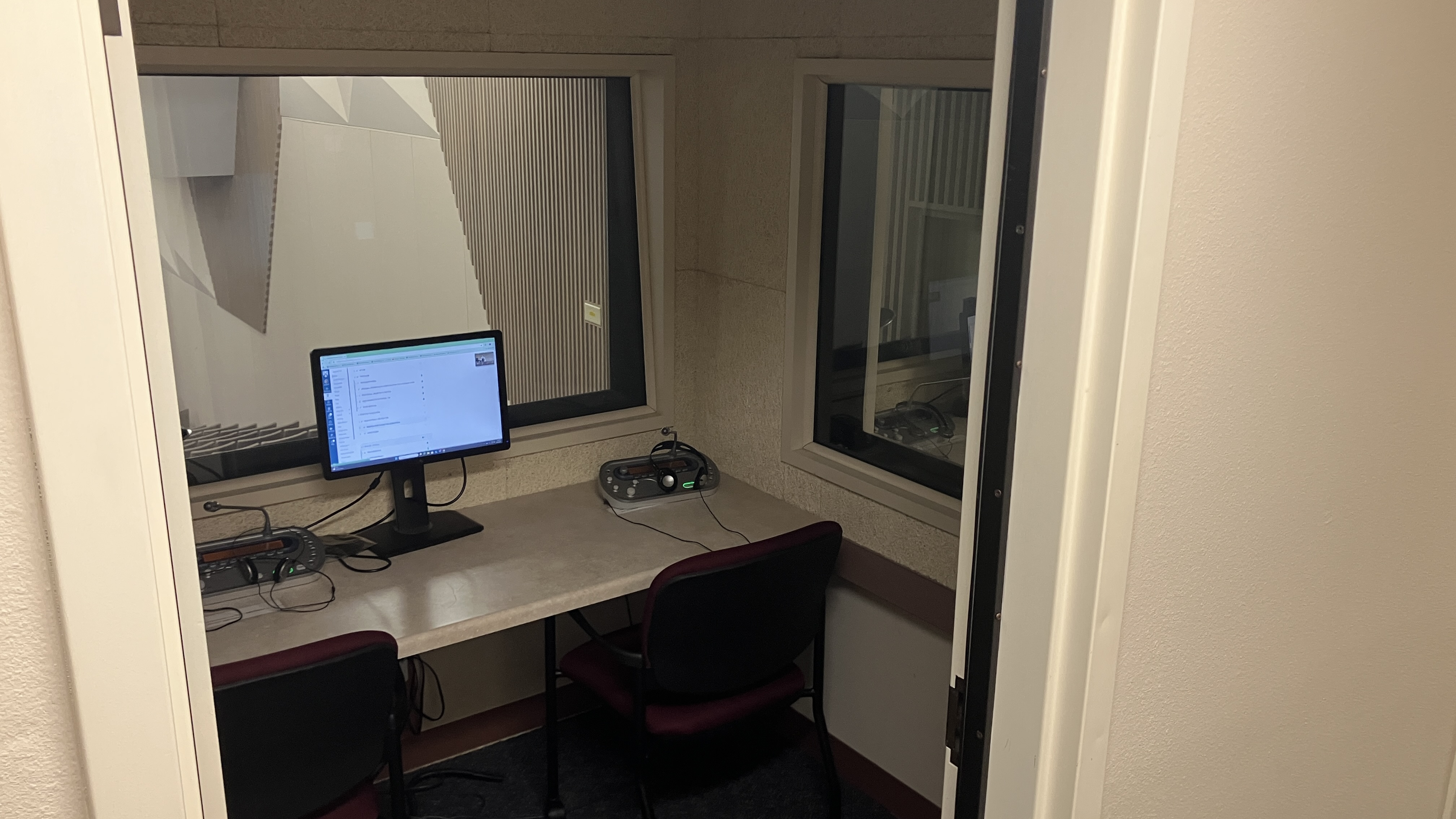
Inside of the interpretation and translation booths at the Irvine Auditorium.

The Middlebury Institute trains translators, interpreters (including conference interpreters), localization experts, and language teachers. It also offers degrees for language teachers who will teach English to speakers of other languages (TESOL) and teach a foreign language. Certificate programs are additionally offered in these areas as well as Language Program Administration.

=== Short-term language programs ===
The Middlebury Institute of International Studies also offers several non-degree programs, including intensive ESL programs year round; summer intensive language programs, custom language services, English for diplomats programs, short term translation and interpretation courses, and international policy certificate programs. The institute is the only school in the Western Hemisphere offering graduate degrees in conference interpretation and in translation and interpretation between English-Chinese, English-Japanese and English-Korean.

=== Nonproliferation and Terrorism Studies (NPTS) ===
The Nonproliferation and Terrorism Studies (NPTS) program at MIIS is a Master's Degree program combining the two fields of terrorism studies and nonproliferation. This MA program, established in 2010, is the first and only program in the world to combine the two fields. having direct access to the combined staffs of the James Martin Center for Nonproliferation Studies (CNS) and the Center on Terrorism, Extremism, and Counterterrorism (CTEC) to be their professors and instructors. Students are also allowed to attend all conferences hosted by CNS, and have direct access to professionals in the field such as Alex Wellerstein and others. Terrorism experts are also brought in from local institutions, such as the Naval Postgraduate School and Stanford University. While the common vernacular states that the term nonproliferation implies specifically to nuclear non-proliferation, here the term is used to define the nonproliferation of any Weapon of mass destruction. Graduates of the NPTS program have been employed after graduation by various world governments, the United States military and intelligence community, the United Nations, the International Atomic Energy Agency, the Department of Energy, and elsewhere in related fields.

=== International Policy and Development (IPD) ===
The Master of Arts in International Policy and Development (IPD) is a graduate program at the Middlebury Institute of International Studies at Monterey. The degree requires 42 credits and can be completed in 12 to 16 months, with entry points in both the fall and spring semesters. The curriculum includes coursework in economics, development theory, global governance, data analysis, and research methods, with the option of additional study in language and intercultural communication.

A distinctive element of the program is a semester-long practicum in which students work with external organizations, either in person or remotely. Practicum placements have included the United Nations, the U.S. Department of State, non-governmental organizations, and private firms, and may take the form of client projects, policy research, or professional assignments. Faculty members are drawn from international institutions such as UNHCR and the World Bank. The program also provides academic and career advising, as well as an alumni network with a concentration in Washington, D.C. Graduates have pursued careers in organizations including USAID, the International Rescue Committee, and Deloitte.

== Research centers and initiatives ==
=== James Martin Center for Nonproliferation Studies ===
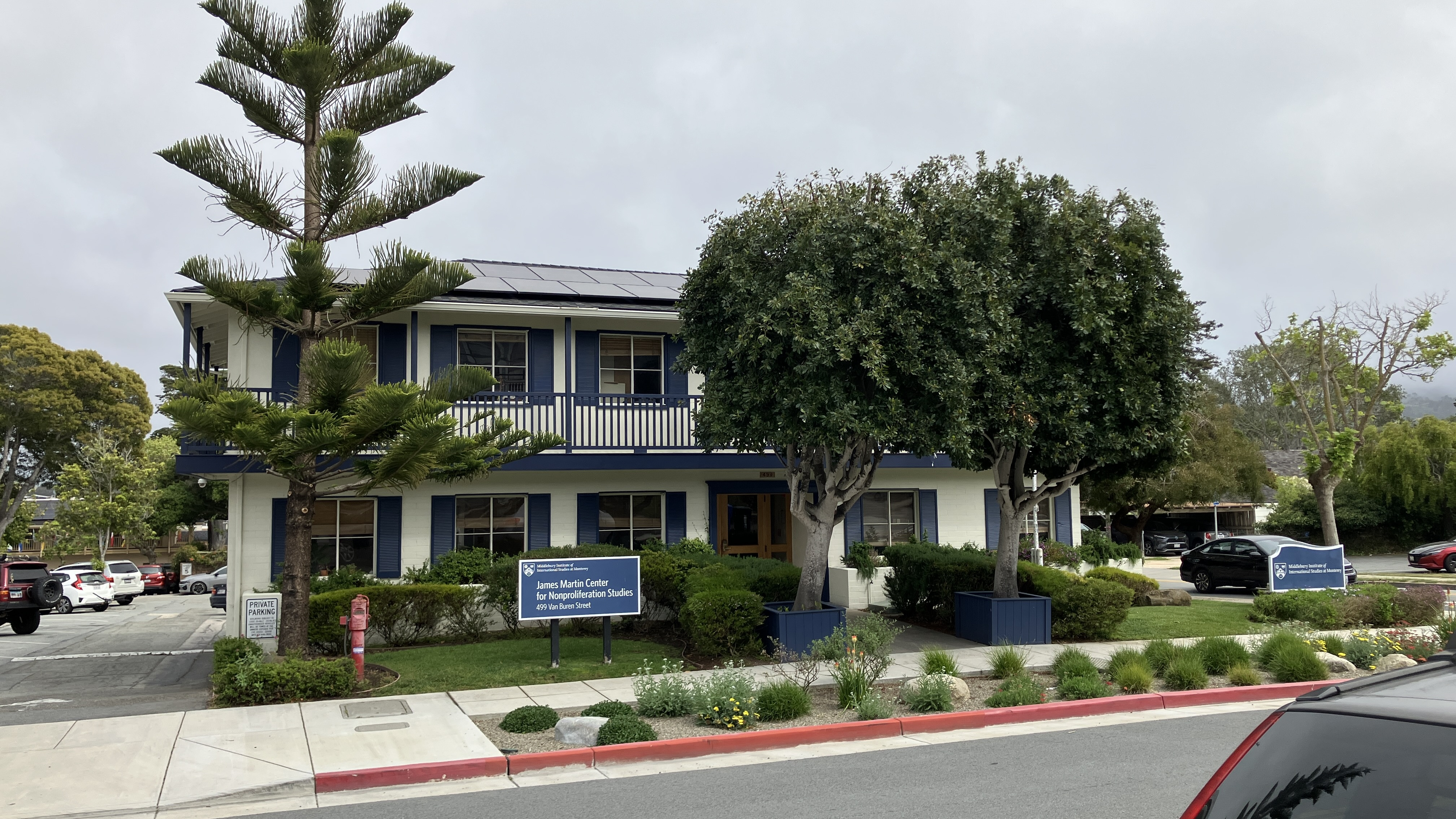
James Martin Center for Nonproliferation Studies.

The James Martin Center for Nonproliferation Studies (CNS) is an American research center located in Monterey, California. It was founded in 1989 by William Potter, world-renowned expert on nuclear non-proliferation. It is the largest nongovernmental organization in the world dedicated to studying, researching and training specialists in combating the spread of Weapons of Mass Destruction (WMD). Its stated mission is "to train the next generation of nonproliferation specialists." CNS operates offices in Monterey, Washington, D.C., and Vienna. These offices offer a variety of programs. In 2007 it was renamed from the Center for Nonproliferation Studies (CNS) in honor of James Martin.

==== Publications ====
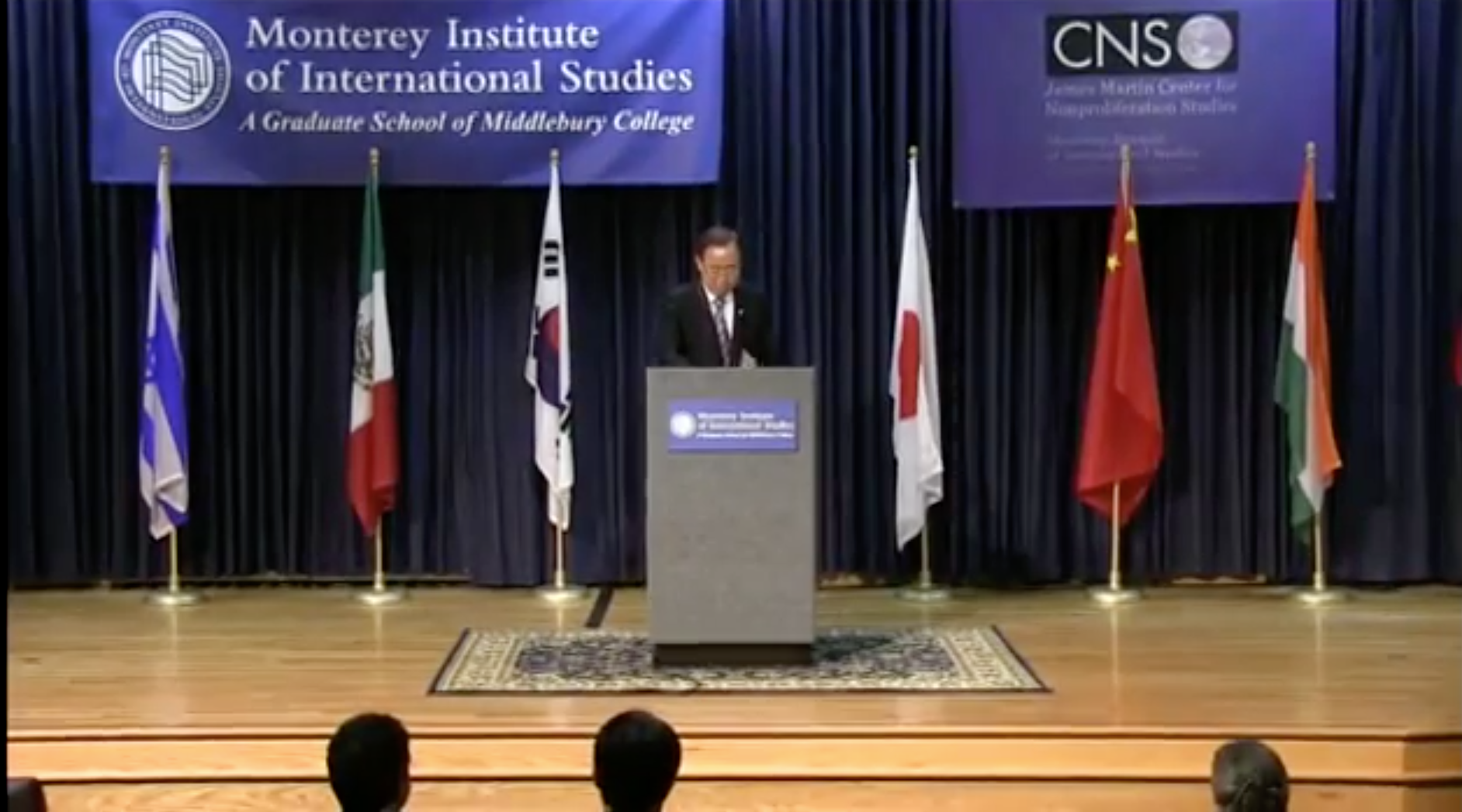
On May 20, 2016, United Nations Secretary-General Ban Ki-moon delivered his major address on "disarmament and nonproliferation of weapons of mass destruction" at the Irvine Auditorium.

CNS publishes The Nonproliferation Review, a double-blind peer-reviewed journal discussing the causes and consequences of Nuclear, Chemical, and Biological Weapons as well as their spread. It also focuses on different case studies, reports, and book reviews about many topics: weapons programs, treaties and export controls, CBRN terrorism, disarmament, and others. The review dates from 1994 to the present and is published in different months of the year.

The Inventory of International Nonproliferation Organizations and Regimes is a website that provides information related to disarmament, nonproliferation of weapons of mass destruction, and arms control. It focuses on treaties, regimes and organizations from different parts of the world that deal with international security topics.

CNS Analysis and Papers is an online website that provides experts' analyzes of non-proliferation, disarmament, and other related topics. Papers are divided according to the regions (Americas, Asia, East Asia, Eurasia/Russia, Europe, Middle East/Africa, South Asia) and are mostly based on current events.

Additionally, CNS provides the public with tutorials and videos where scholars and experts analyze current events related to non-proliferation. The NukeTube Nonproliferation Multimedia Library provides readers with open public online material.

=== Center for the Blue Economy ===
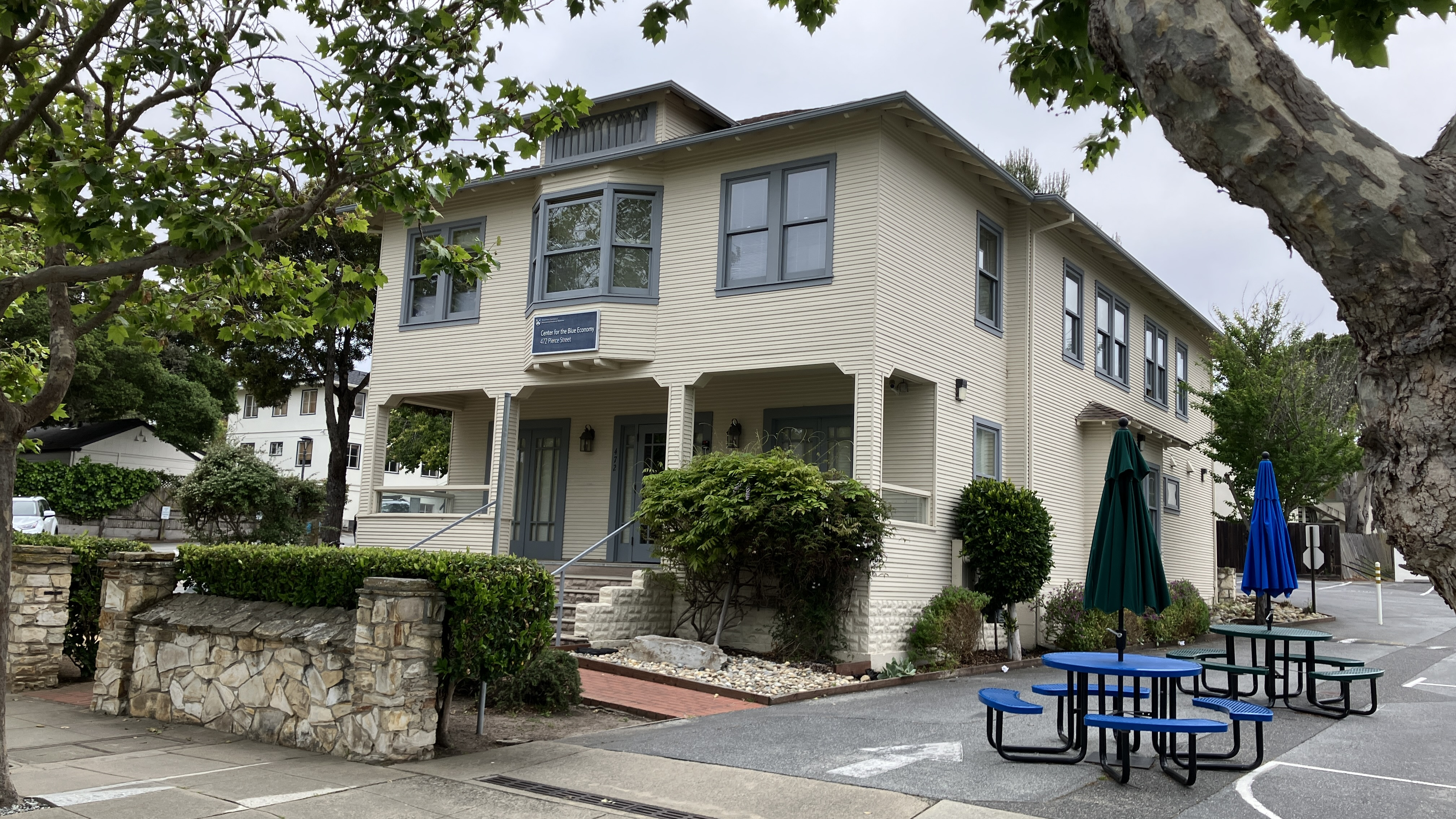
Center for the Blue Economy

The Center for the Blue Economy (CBE) is a research center managed by MIIS. CBE was founded in year 2011 and focuses mainly on research related to the ocean and the coastal economy. The center also complements the International Environmental Policy program by offering specialization courses in Ocean and Coastal Resource Management. The center works in collaboration with various local and national organizations on a wide range of topics including climate adaptation in coastal areas, governing environmental issues and also finding solutions to problems that are affecting ocean and coastal economies. CBE is home to the National Ocean Economics Program, which compiles, analyzes, and publishes economic data about changes and trends along the U.S. coast and in coastal waters.

CBE also offers summer fellowships to the students to work on a wide range of projects related to ocean and coastal resource management. The Speakers Series (Sustainability Speaker Series and the Marine speaker series) organized by the center is a unique platform where experts working in different fields, mainly oceans and coastal issues, are invited to deliver lectures. This speaker series is organized every year and is open to students, researchers, faculty, and the public. The center has its own peer-reviewed journal Journal of Ocean and Coastal Economics (JOCE) that has published around 57 research articles.

=== Center on Terrorism, Extremism, and Counterterrorism (CTEC) ===
Center on Terrorism, Extremism, and Counterterrorism
- Founder: Jason M. Blazakis
- Established: September, 2018
- Key people: Alex Newhouse, Katharine Petrich, J.M. Berger, Philipp Bleek, Amy Cooter
- Owner: Middlebury Institute of International Studies at Monterey
- Address: McGowan Building, 2nd floor
- Location: Monterey, California, United States of America
- Website: https://www.middlebury.edu/institute/academics/centers-initiatives/ctec

The Center on Terrorism, Extremism, and Counterterrorism (CTEC), formerly known as the Monterey Terrorism Research Education Program (MonTREPP), and before that the Weapons of Mass Destruction Terrorism Research Program (WMDTRP), is a research center at the Middlebury Institute of International Studies at Monterey(MIIS), in Monterey, California. CTEC is staffed by professionals employed in the fields of terrorism studies, counterterrorism, and countering violent extremism, as well as professors working for MIIS. CTEC conducts in-depth research on terrorism and other forms of extremism. It is one of a handful of designated "Terrorism Research Centers," in the United States. CTEC's research focus is on three crucial areas: threat finance and sanctions, extremist messaging and terrorist use of the internet, terrorist special operations and countering the threat of terrorism.

CTEC engages faculty experts and graduate students in mixed-methods research on terrorist threats, extremist networks, and counterterrorism responses. Its work encompasses several key domains, including militant accelerationism, the study of online extremism and digital platforms for radicalization, threat financing and sanctioning as tools to disrupt extremist groups, and programs for preventing and countering violent extremism (P/CVE). The center also examines the implications of emerging technologies for extremist activity and counterterrorism practice.

Within these areas of focus, CTEC develops research initiatives and collaborative projects that are intended to provide insight for policymakers, law enforcement, and nongovernmental organizations. The center’s applied research model integrates academic study with policy-oriented outcomes, aiming to inform both domestic and international approaches to countering violent extremism (CVE). By combining the resources of a graduate academic institution with practitioner-oriented research, CTEC positions itself as a bridge between scholarship and real-world counterterrorism efforts.

In August, 2025, Middlebury College President Ian Baucomb announced that MIIS would be permanently shuttered sometime in the summer of 2027. CTEC, as a self-sustaining research center, will remain part of the Middlebury umbrella after the school in Monterey is permanently closed.

While CTEC formerly published independent publications as MonTREP, it currently maintains no publications outside of the URL for Middlebury College.

==== History of CTEC ====
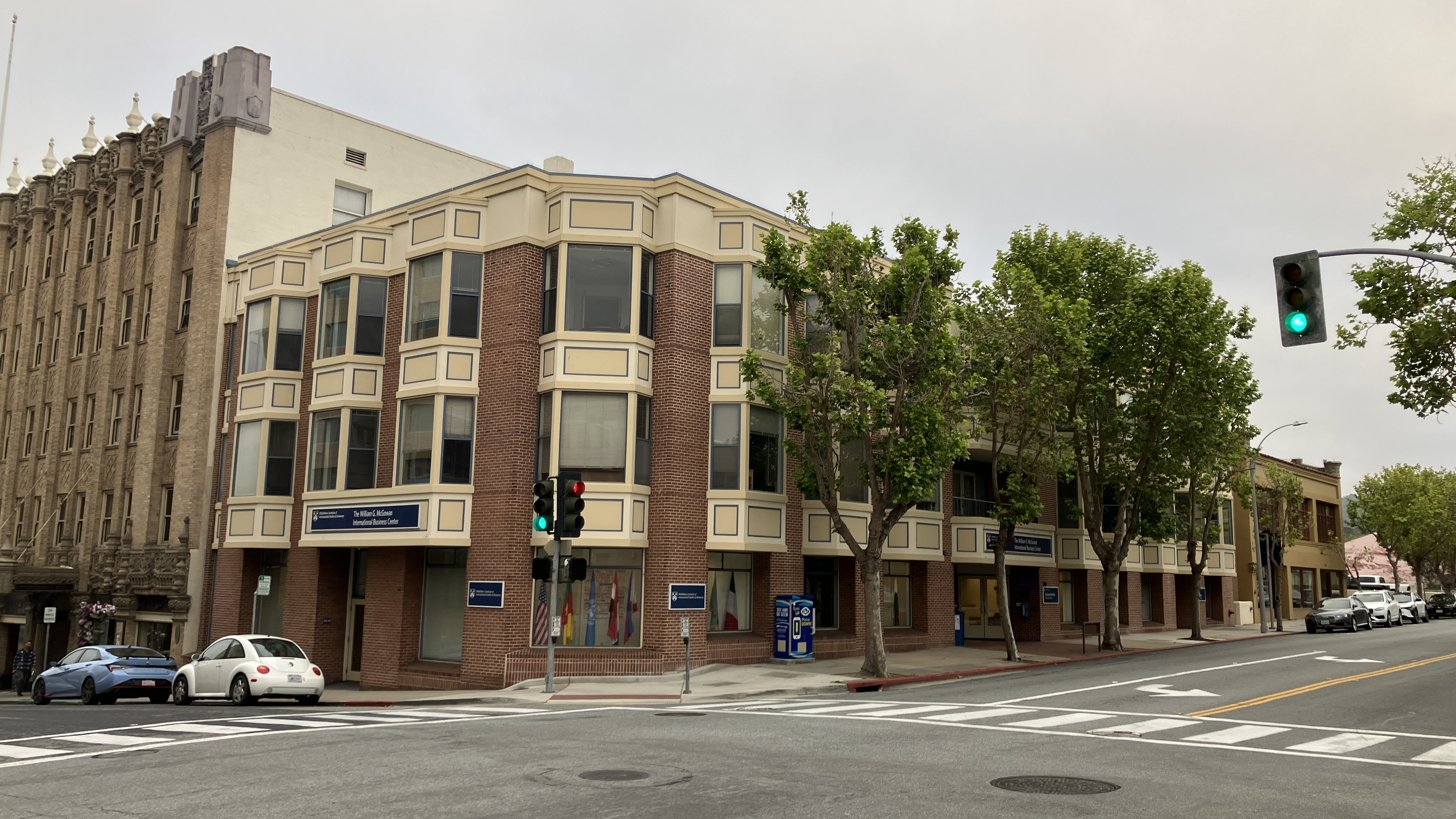
CTEC is located on the 2nd floor of the McGowan Building at Middlebury Institute of International Studies at Monterey in Monterey, California.

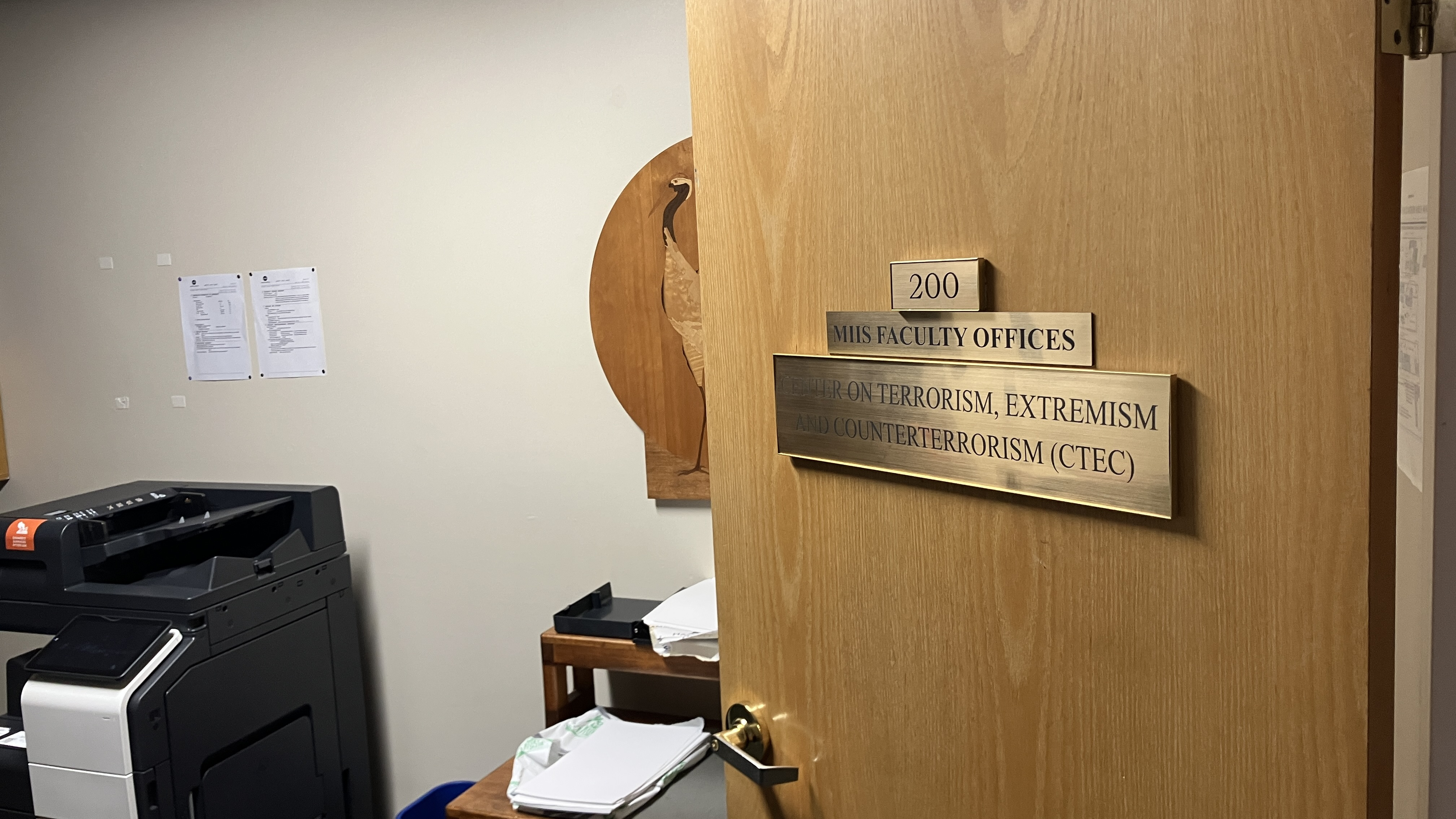
Entrance to CTEC on the 2nd floor of McGowan.

In Fall 2018, the Center on Terrorism, Extremism, and Counterterrorism (CTEC) at the Monterey Institute of International Studies (MIIS) was established in 2018 from the foundations of MonTREP. However, with CTEC's status as a fully-fledged research center, it was granted much more autonomy in research and direction than MonTREP.

Jason Blazakis, a former U.S. government official and counterterrorism specialist, became director of CTEC in July, shortly before the Fall semester began. Before joining the Institute, he had spent a decade as director of the Counterterrorism Finance and Designations Office, Bureau of Counterterrorism, Department of State, where he worked on issues related to the designation and sanctioning of terrorist organizations. Earlier in his career, he held additional roles in the counterterrorism and intelligence fields within the federal government.

Blazakis’s vision for the newly established CTEC was to examine terrorism through the study of behavior, ideology, methodology, and operations. He outlined three main areas where the center would direct its research:

- threat finance and sanctions
- extremist messaging and the use of online platforms
- the role of special operations in countering violent extremism.

The first area was intended to provide expert analysis on the financial networks associated with terrorism, crime, and proliferation. The second sought to examine social media and other digital forums to better understand how extremist messaging motivated individuals to violence. The third was linked to the Special Operations Research Database(SORD), a project led by Middlebury College professor Orion Lewis, which CTEC planned to support by making the database a resource for studying the deployment and effectiveness of special operations in counterterrorism.

Blazakis stepped away from the role of Director of CTEC to run for Congress in New Jersey's 7th District. However, he dropped out of the democratic primary, nominating Sue Altman. He still maintains a role as a professor at MIIS, but spends much of his time teaching online courses due to his commitments on the East Coast.

In the interim, the role of Director of CTEC was assumed by Dr. Katharine Petrich.

=== Partnership with META ===
In 2022, Meta established a research partnership with the Center on Terrorism, Extremism, and Counterterrorism at the Middlebury Institute of International Studies to study developments in violent extremism and assess methods for supporting community-based responses. The collaboration was intended to study patterns of violent extremism and evaluate strategies to strengthen community-based responses. In addition, Meta organized a program of trainings, workshops, and skill-building sessions that aimed to equip local partners working against hate-motivated violence with resources and techniques to amplify their efforts.

=== Weapons of Mass Destruction Terrorism Research Program (WMDTRP) ===
WMDTRP
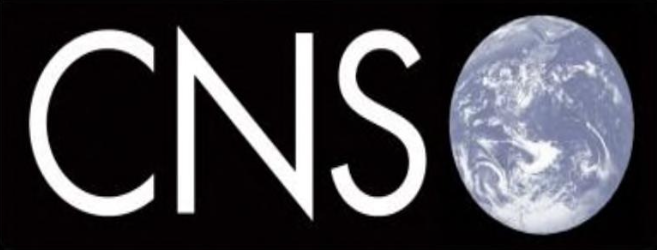
- Founder: Gary Anthony Ackerman
- Established: 2002
- Key people: Sundara Vadlamudi, Jeffrey M. Bale, Sammy Salama, Gaurav Kampani, Praveen Abhayaratne, Charles Blair
- Owner: Center for Nonproliferation Studies
- Address: 400 Pacific Street
- Location: Monterey, California
- Website: https://web.archive.org/web/20050306004813/http://www.cns.miis.edu/cns/projects/wmdtrp
- Dissolved: 2012

In the early 2000s, the Weapons of Mass Destruction Terrorism Research Program (WMDTRP) was established by Dr. Gary Ackerman as a program of the Center for Nonproliferation Studies at the Monterey Institute of International Studies in Monterey, California. The work of WMDTRP focused on issues at the intersection of terrorism and weapons of mass destruction (WMD), with particular attention to the possibility of non-state actors acquiring or using chemical, biological, radiological, or nuclear (CBRN) weapons and materials. The program examined factors that might motivate terrorist organizations to pursue WMD, and aimed to provide analysis that could inform policymakers, scholars, and the public.

WMDTRP engaged in research projects intended to combine scholarly rigor with practical application, including partnerships with both governmental and non-governmental organizations. Among the institutions it worked with were the U.S. Centers for Disease Control and Prevention, the Defense Threat Reduction Agency, the Department of Homeland Security, Los Alamos and Lawrence Livermore National Laboratories, Sandia National Laboratories, the Organization for the Prohibition of Chemical Weapons, the Nuclear Threat Initiative, and the Weapons of Mass Destruction Commission chaired by Hans Blix. The program also became a partner in the Homeland Security National Center for the Study of Terrorism and the Response to Terrorism (NC-START), one of the Department of Homeland Security’s Centers of Excellence.

Research conducted by WMDTRP combined regional knowledge, technical assessments, and multidisciplinary approaches, including historical, sociological, and scientific analysis. The four categories of WMDTRP's work were:

- Analysis
- Data Collection
- Education
- Community Outreach

The program was directed by Gary Ackerman and staffed by scholars with expertise in social sciences, physical sciences, and policy studies. Senior staff included Jeffrey M. Bale and Gaurav Kampani, with research associates such as Praveen Abhayaratne, Charles Blair, Sammy Salama, and Sundara Vadlamudi. Graduate student research assistants from the Monterey Institute contributed to the program as part of their training in nonproliferation studies.

Between 2004 and 2005, the staff of WMDTRP, and especially its director Gary Ackerman, worked to transition WMDTRP into a new program established more specifically to address issues of terrorism in research, which would be called the Monterey Terrorism Research and Education Program (MonTREP). The WMDTRP maintained a database, called the WMD Terrorism Research Database. After MonTREP was established in 2006, WMDTRP continued to exist, but primarily to maintain the database.

=== Monterey Terrorism Research Education Program (MonTREP) ===
MonTREP
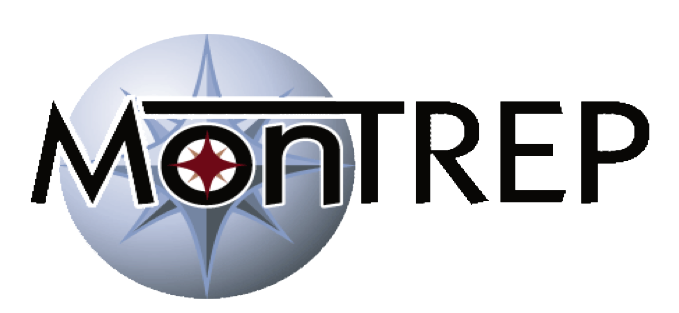
- Established: 2006
- Mission: to research topics related to terrorism studies and extremist movements; to educate students about the history and trends of these groups; to generate policy recommendations that can guide professionals in counterterrorism and related fields; to be an academic and professional resource to MIIS students, those professionals concerned with terrorism related issues, and the wider international security community
- Key people: General Howard, Gordon M. Hahn, Amy Cooter, Moyara Ruehsen, Fred Wehling, Gary Ackerman, Jeffrey M. Bale
- Owner: GSIPS, Middlebury Institute of International Studies at Monterey
- Address: McGowan Building, 2nd floor
- Location: Monterey, California, United States of America
- Website: https://web.archive.org/web/20080918015137/http://montrep.miis.edu/
- Dissolved: 2018

The Monterey Terrorism Research and Education Program (MonTREP) was a research center at the Monterey Institute of International Studies (MIIS), in Monterey, California. Established as part of the institute's Graduate School of International Policy Studies (GSIPS), it carried out research, policy analysis, and public education on terrorism and international security. The program focused on the study of extremist groups, including their historical development, ideology, organizational structures, demographics, and operational methods, with particular attention to the potential for mass-casualty attacks and the possible acquisition of weapons of mass destruction (WMD). Its research was aimed to inform both policymakers and the general public about the motivations and strategies of terrorist actors in order to support more effective counterterrorism policies.

MonTREP collaborated with government agencies, international organizations, and academic foundations, and was a partner in the Department of Homeland Security’s National Center for the Study of Terrorism and the Response to Terrorism (NC-START), one of the department’s Centers of Excellence. Its work combined historical, sociological, and technical analysis with expertise in regional and language studies, producing assessments on terrorism, weapons proliferation, and international security. The program was staffed by faculty and researchers from a range of disciplines. Key figures included Fred Wehling, Jeffrey M. Bale, Sammy Salama, and Sundara Vadlamudi, supported by additional researchers and graduate assistants specializing in nonproliferation and security studies.

==== Terrorism Studies Club ====
For a brief time, beginning on August 26, 2013, there existed a Terrorism Studies Club (TSC) run by students studying MANPTS courses through MonTREP. The first president of the club signed their posts to the club's newsletter as "C." In the espionage and terrorism studies community, "C" often refers to the director of the British Secret Services, and stood for "Control."

TSC held annual student-driven conferences on terrorism in Monterey. The second annual conference, which was held from March 6–7, 2014, was focused on terrorism and counterterrorism in Africa. There were panel discussions and a keynote address was made by Congressman Jim Kolbe. Over 100 people attended the conference.

The last entry from the TSC was posted to their newsletter on January 28, 2016, detailing the MonTREP Antiquities Conference.

==== History (2006-2018) ====
On January 20, 2005, MIIS was awarded a grant to focus on reducing worldwide terrorism. By 2006, MIIS had established a program aimed at addressing the goals of this grant, called the Monterey Terrorism Research Education Program (MonTREP). Fred Wehling and Gary Ackerman served in 2006 as MonTREP's research directors, and Moyara Ruehsen was serving as MonTREP's education director. The senior researcher at the time was Jeffrey Bale, who had been working at MIIS for several years.

Bale served as director of MonTREP during the 10th anniversary of the September 11 attacks.

In September 2012, retired Brigadier General Russell D. Howard, a Special Forces veteran and MIIS graduate, was appointed director of MonTREP, replacing Bale, who remained in a teaching role. Before this role, he directed the Jebsen Center for Counterterrorism Studies at the Fletcher School, served as head of the Department of Social Sciences and founding director of the Combating Terrorism Center at West Point, and previously commanded the 1st Special Forces Group (Airborne) at Fort Lewis, Washington. He also held an appointment as Army Chief of Staff Fellow at Harvard University’s Center for International Affairs. By the time of his appointment, he had authored and edited multiple works on terrorism.

Howard's replacement as interim director in 2014 was Sharad Joshi, who had been working as a Research Associate at MonTREP since 2008, after transferring from his postdoctoral fellowship at the James Martin Center for Nonproliferation Studies (CNS). General Howard remained in the program for several years as an associate professor.

On January 5, 2015, a delegation from China’s Ministry of Industry and Information Technology (MIIT) visited MonTREP. During the visit, graduate students Leslie Wukstich, Jonathan Prohov, and Marc Elliott delivered presentations examining the links between threat finance and unconventional funding sources for terrorism. Prohov and Elliott discussed a MonTREP research project on antiquities trafficking as a form of terrorist financing and highlighted an op-ed they had co-authored with General Howard. The presentations were followed by a question-and-answer session, with consecutive translation provided by a student from the MIIS language department, Flora (Tian) Zhang. MonTREP experts Melissa Hanham and Stephanie Lieggi also participated in the discussions.

By 2016, MonTREP was casting out for a new Director, placing adds for professors of MANTPS to be available to become the director of the new program.

In 2018, MonTREP was redesigned and elevated from program status into a fully-fledged center, and rebranded as the Center on Terrorism, Extremism, and Counterterrorism (CTEC).

==== Publications ====
The Islam, Islamism and Politics in Eurasia Report (IIPER) was a periodical established by Gordon M. Hahn. Produced between November 2009 and early 2013, it issued 67 editions and covered political developments related to Islam, Islamism, and jihadist movements in Russia and the wider Eurasian region. Hahn compiled, edited, and authored most of the content. IIPER was initially published through Hahn’s affiliation with the MonTREP, where he was serving as senior researcher and adjunct professor. In September 2011, publication of the report was transferred to the Center for Strategic and International Studies (CSIS) in Washington, D.C., where Hahn was a non-resident senior associate in the Russia and Eurasia Program until the report ceased in 2013.

== William Tell Coleman Library ==
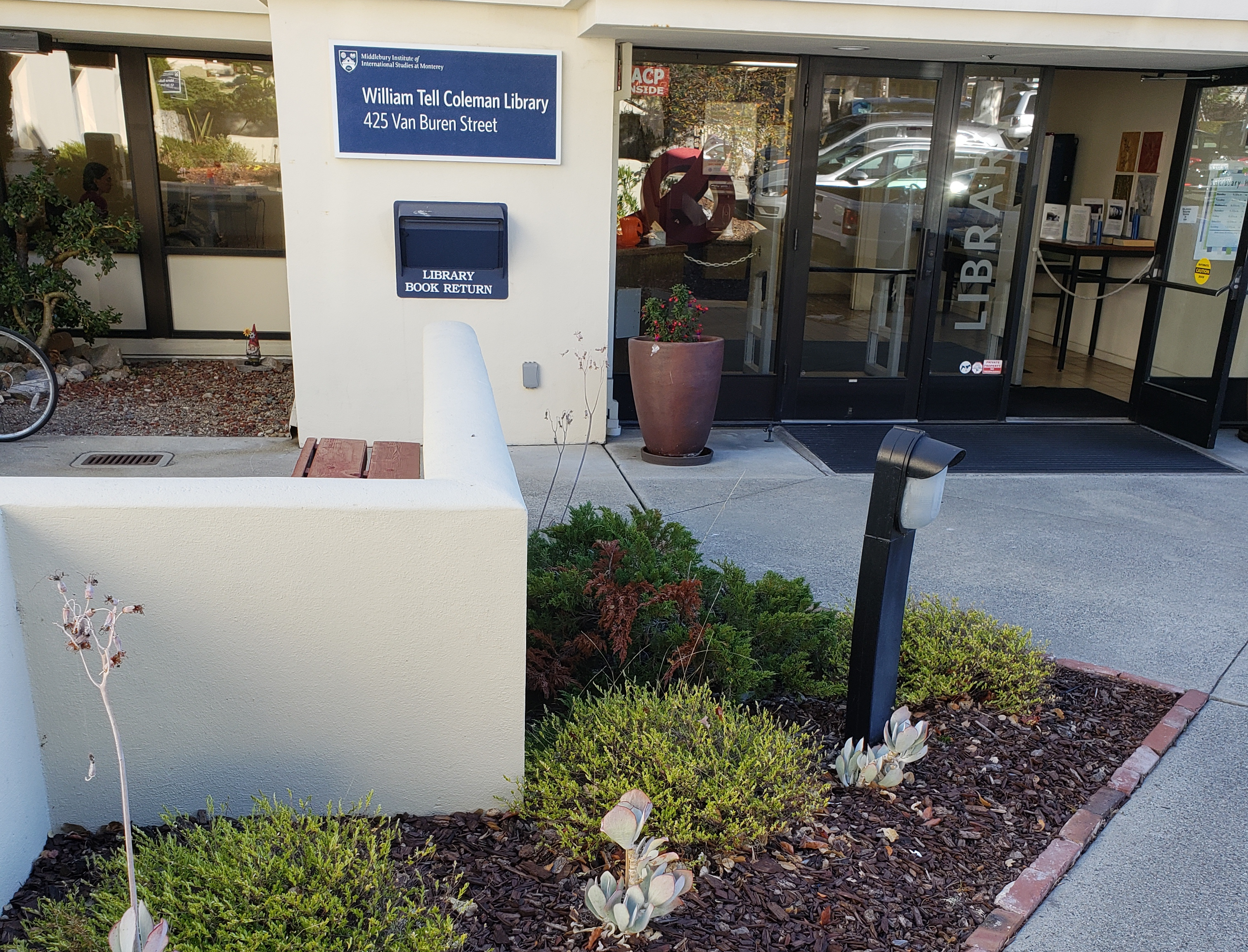
Entrance to William Tell Coleman Library

The William Tell Coleman Library at the Middlebury Institute of International Studies opened in 1955. The library is named after the American pioneer William Tell Coleman, whose family donated money in the early days of the institute. Since its opening, the library has served as a central research hub for students, faculty, staff, alumni, and the local community.

The school's first librarian was World War II survivor and Polish Jew Eva Schroeder. The library provides access to a broad range of resources such as technology, collaborative and quiet study spaces, books in different languages, and online databases.

The institute library's collection consists of approximately 100,000 print volumes, more than 600 print periodical subscriptions, and 35 daily and weekly newspapers. The library is well known for its extensive collection of specialized dictionaries in fields such as trade, diplomacy, nonproliferation, and translation interpretation studies. More than one-third of the library's collection is in a language other than English. The most significant are Chinese, Japanese, Korean, Russian, Arabic, French, Spanish, German, and Portuguese. It also has a large collection of DVDs and streaming films.

The library subscribes to over 50 online databases and hundreds of online academic journals, including JSTOR, Taylor & Francis, and ScienceDirect. Since Middlebury College in Vermont and Middlebury Institute have been under the same umbrella, MIIS students have priority access to Middlebury College's collection through their Interlibrary Loan service.

== Campus life ==
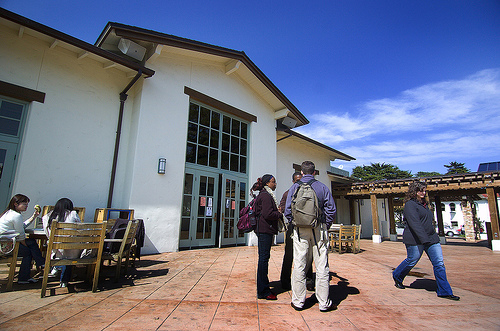
Samson Center at the Middlebury Institute of International Studies

=== Sustainable campus ===
In April 2002, the institute signed the Talloires Declaration, joining more than 600 universities internationally in committing to sustainable practices on campus. The institute aims to achieve carbon neutrality through a variety of practices, including the purchase of carbon offsets to reduce the institute's environmental impact.

The institute's Sustainability Council was established in 2007 and is composed of faculty, staff, and students. The council's goal is to promote and implement campus-wide sustainability projects and initiatives.

In the spring of 2009, the institute's organic garden was established by students, and subsequently became a student-led community organic garden. Current organic garden projects include a worm composting initiative and the introduction of 1,500 ladybugs and 150 praying mantises as natural pest control measures. Two insect houses have been added in an effort to attract local bees.

Current Sustainability Council projects include a Climate Action Plan, an annual Greenhouse Gas Emission Audit, a student-run organic garden, and planning for future solar panel and EV charging station installation. In May 2019, the institute hosted what some believe may have been the first 100 percent plant-based graduation reception by a graduate school in the U.S. Institute policy requires that all campus events offer at least 50 percent plant-based food options.

== Notable campus buildings and facilities ==
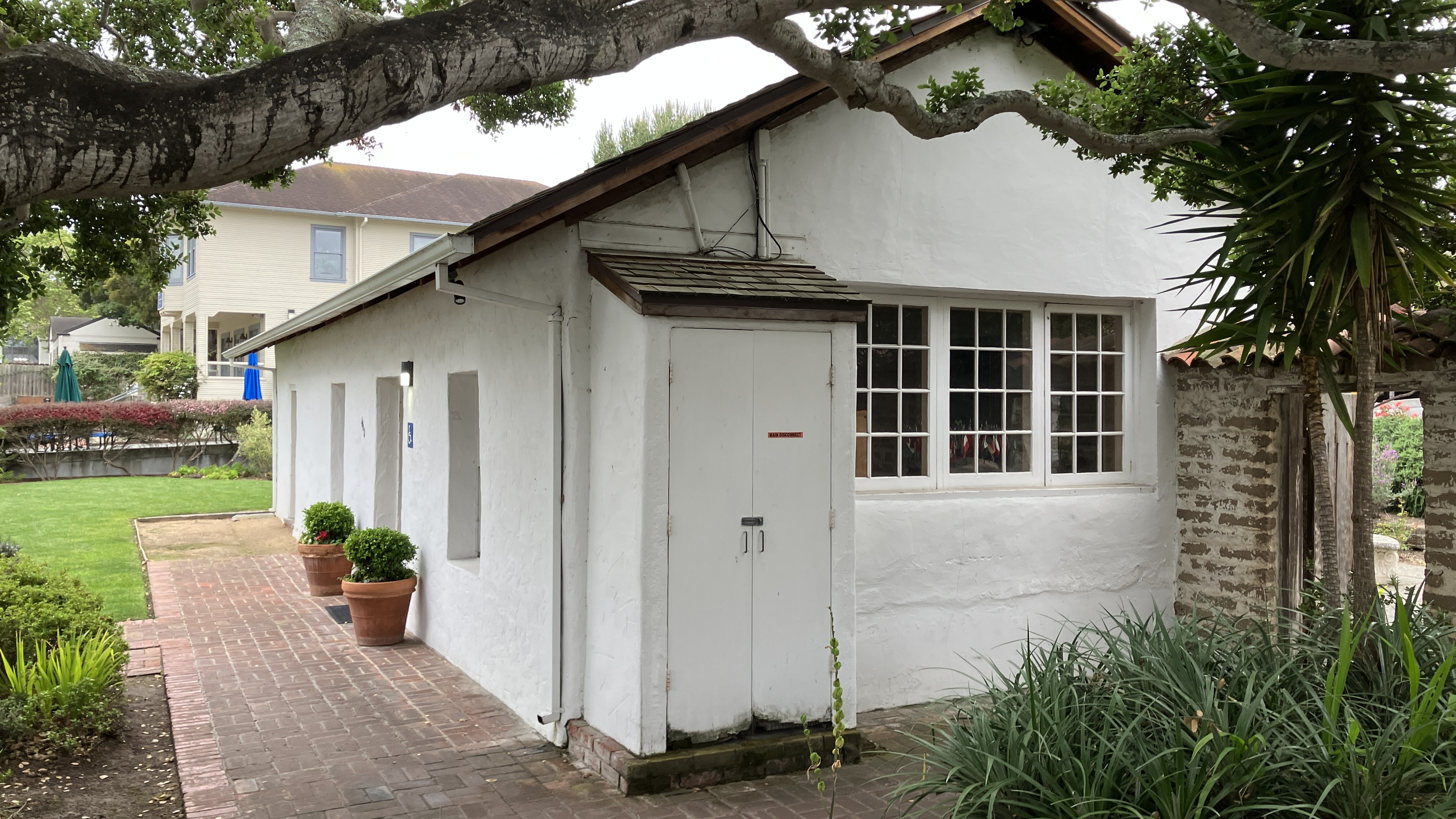
- John Steinbeck lived in the Lara Soto Adobe while writing The Pearl.
  The Segal building, located at 425 Van Buren Street, is formerly the Carnegie library of Monterey and was the old library of Monterey and the first building purchased by MIIS in 1961.
- McCone Hall was named after John A. McCone and Theiline Pigott McCone. The McCones were on the Board of Trustees for MIIS during the 1980s. John McCone was the former Director of the Central Intelligence Agency, and Theiline McCone was the former Regent of Seattle University.
- The building at 400 Pacific Street, which is used today as an academic building with offices, is an historic building formerly known as "Capitular Hall," or the LaVellee Adobe.
- The Lara-Soto Adobe, located in the center of campus, is a designated "Zone H" historic building where the American author John Steinbeck lived while writing The Pearl.
- The Bergschicker House is a designated "Zone H" historic building occupied by the Institute for staff housing.
- The Jules Simeneau House is a "potentially designated" historic building occupied by the School for the Environment.
- The Kinnoull House, located at 426 Van Buren Street, is named after one of the co-founders of the institute, Enid Margaret Hamlyn Hay, the Countess Claude of Kinnoull. Kinnoull was married to the Earl of Kinnoull at the end of World War I, became a professional sports car driver, an aviator, a painter, and a writer. During World War II, she joined the British and French Secret Services and spied for them.
- Morse Hall is named after Samuel Finley Brown Morse, the man who secured and underwrote the loan to purchase Segal Hall.

== Presidents of the Institute ==
=== Presidents of the Monterey Institute of Foreign Studies ===
- (1955–1968) Gaspard Etienne Weiss
- (1969–1974) (died in office) Fulton H. Freeman
- (1974-1977) Samson Benjamin Knoll
  - Knoll was already the Chancellor of the Institute when Freeman died. He carried out the duties of President until a replacement for Freeman was found.
- (1977) (ad-interim) Robert von Pagenhardt
- (1977–1980) Jack Kolbert

=== Presidents of the Monterey Institute of International Studies ===
- (1980–1988) William Gregory Craig
- (1987–1998) Robert G. Gard Jr.
- (1998-1999) Richard M. Krasno
- (2000–2003) Chester "Chet" Haskell
- (2003–2005) Steven J. Baker
  - Steve Baker was the last President of the school before the affiliation agreement with Middlebury College. Middlebury College then appointed one of its own Vice Presidents, Clara Yu, to take over from President Baker at the end of the calendar year.
- (Dec. 31, 2005 – December 31, 2008) Clara W. Yu
- (January 2009 – Feb 1, 2015) Sunder Ramaswamy

=== Vice President of Academic Affairs and Dean of the Middlebury Institute of International Studies at Monterey ===
- (February 1, 2015) (Currently serving) Jeff Dayton-Johnson
  - Johnson was appointed to the position of Vice President for Academic Affairs and Dean of the Institute on December 2, 2014. However, he served under President Ramaswamy until the role of President of the Institute was eliminated, and Dayton-Johnson took over day-to-day operations of the school.

== Notable faculty ==
- Valentin Berezhkov: former interpreter for Joseph Stalin and Vyacheslav Molotov, in meetings with Winston Churchill, and Adolf Hitler. After the dissolution of the USSR, he migrated to the United States and taught at MIIS from 1992 until his death in 1998.
- Jan Knippers Black: a prolific writer and long-time educator in the field of human rights. She sat on the board of Amnesty International USA and has been honored by multiple domestic and international rights organizations for her commitment to advocacy.
- Claude A. Buss: former member of the State Department and specialist in East Asian studies, taught courses at MIFS in the 1960s while simultaneously serving on the faculty of Stanford University.
- Avner Cohen: an Israeli-American writer, historian, and professor who is well known for his works on nuclear weapons in the Middle East. He authored the seminal work, Israel and the Bomb, which chronicled the Israeli nuclear program and was published in 1998.
- Geoffrey Dabelko: an expert on security and the environment and the director of the Environmental Change and Security Program (ECSP) at the Woodrow Wilson International Center for Scholars in Washington, D.C.
- Jayantha Dhanapala: Sri Lanka's Ambassador to the United States from 1995 to 1997, served as "Diplomat-in-Residence" for the Center for Nonproliferation Studies in the late 1990s, before being appointed United Nations Undersecretary General for Disarmament Affairs in 1998.
- Bates Gill: the former director of the Stockholm International Peace Research Institute, served as a specialist on China's military industrial establishment at MIIS in 1998.
- Russell D. Howard: retired Brigadier General and Special Forces soldier, directed MonTREP in the 2010s.
- Vladislav Krasnov (or W. George Krasnow): defector from the Soviet Union, was the Director of Russian Studies at the Monterey Institute from 1978 to 1991
- Edward J. Laurance: specialist in the nonproliferation of illicit small arms and light weapons, cofounder of the International Action Network on Small Arms; former consultant on the United Nations Coordinating Action on Small Arms, the Panel of Experts on Small arms and Light Weapons, United Nations Register of Conventional Arms, the Programme of Action to Prevent, Combat and Eradicate the Illicit Trade in Small Army and Light Weapons in All its Aspects (UN PoA), and the International Small Arms Control Standards. Served as Dean of MIIS from 2006 to 2009.
- Beryl Levinger: a former senior official with CARE, Save the Children, Education Development Center, and AFS Intercultural Programs; founder of the Peace Corps Fellows program; co-founder of InterAction; and, co-founder (with Vicky Colbert and Oscar Mogollón) of the internationally acclaimed Escuela Nueva (New School) movement.
- Jeffrey Lewis: adjunct professor, director of the East Asia Nonproliferation Program at the James Martin Center for Nonproliferation Studies, and a widely quoted expert on North Korea's nuclear program.
- Ibrahim al-Marashi: research associate and professor working at MIIS and CNS from 2002 to 2013. In 2003, a paper that Marashi had written about the Gulf War was plagiarized by MI6, and the resulting intelligence product known as the Dodgy Dossier was then subsequently used by Colin Powell as evidence to justify the commencement of the Iraq War.
- Bill Monning: taught classes at MIIS from 1995 to 2008 in International Negotiation and Conflict Resolution before becoming the Majority Leader of the California Senate.
- Joseph Nation: former member of the California State Assembly, taught classes at MIIS in economics, public policy, public finance, and foreign policy.
- William Potter: expert on nuclear non-proliferation.

== Notable alumni ==
- José Aybar, president of Richard J. Daley College
- Tim Ballard, American anti-human trafficking activist and author. The film Sound of Freedom was inspired by his work.
- Sam Farr, the U.S. representative for California's 17th and 20th congressional district, serving from 1993 to 2017
- Temie Giwa-Tubosun, founder and CEO of LifeBank
- Brendan Kyle Hatcher, U.S. diplomat
- Russell D. Howard: retired Brigadier General and Special Forces soldier, later came back to MIIS as a professor
- Matthew Levin, Ambassador of Canada to Spain and Andorra. He was previously the Ambassador of Canada to Cuba and Colombia.
- Gil Loescher, American political scientist and survivor of the 2003 Canal Hotel bombing
- Daggubati Venkatesh, a popular actor in Telugu film industry
- Brian C. Wilson, historian of American religion
