= Study of Environmental Arctic Change =

Study of Environmental Arctic Change (SEARCH) is a collaborative program of Arctic researchers, funding agencies, and others that facilitates the synthesis of Arctic science and communicates the current understanding to help society respond to a rapidly changing Arctic.

SEARCH activities are supported by a collaborative grant from the National Science Foundation Division of Polar Programs, Arctic Sciences Section to the International Arctic Research Center, and the Arctic Research Consortium of the US. These resources have been further supplemented by recent contributions from the National Center for Atmospheric Research, the U.S. Geological Survey, the University of Alaska Fairbanks, the Center for the Blue Economy (Middlebury Institute of International Studies at Monterey) and the U.S. Arctic Research Commission. Other agencies have provided program support in the past and continue their intellectual engagement.

SEARCH focuses on how shrinking land ice, diminishing sea ice, and degrading permafrost impact Arctic and global systems.

== See also ==
- Arctic shrinkage
- Climate of the Arctic
