= Aybar =

Aybar is a Spanish surname of Basque origin. In addition, it is used in Turkey as a surname and means "grandeur". The word is also employed as a masculine given name.

Notable people with the name include:

== Surname ==
- Erick Aybar, baseball shortstop and younger brother of Willy Aybar
- José Aybar, American educator
- José Rafael Llenas Aybar, Dominican Republic murder victim
- Manny Aybar, baseball pitcher
- Mehmet Ali Aybar, Turkish lawyer and politician
- Noelia Aybar (born 1984), Spanish football player
- Willy Aybar, baseball infielder

== Given name ==
- Aybar Abdulla (born 2002), Kazakhstani football player
- Aybar Zhaksylykov (born 1997), Kazakhstani football player

== See also ==
- Aibar, Spanish village
