= Edward J. Laurance =

American expert on small arms, light weapons, and the illicit arms trade

Dean of the Graduate School of International Policy Studies, Monterey Institute of International Studies
- In office 2006–2009
- President: Clara W. Yu; Sunder Ramaswamy

Panel of Governmental Experts on Small Arms and Light Weapons
- In office 1996–1997

Personal details
- Born: September 1938 (age 88)
- Education: United States Military Academy; University of Pennsylvania; Temple University

Military service
- Branch/service: United States Army
- Battles/wars: Vietnam War

Edward J. "Ed" Laurance is a retired American academic and expert on international arms control, with a particular focus on small arms and light weapons. He is best known for his role in establishing international policy frameworks at the United Nations to limit the illicit proliferation of small arms, as well as for his long career as a professor and administrator at the Monterey Institute of International Studies (MIIS). He has written published papers, articles, and books related to this subject matter. He retired from MIIS in 2017 after 25 years of teaching and research.

Laurance engaged with governments, international organizations, and non-governmental actors, introducing perspectives across institutional boundaries and contributing to the diffusion of norms and policy change. He has been described as a "boundary role occupant," someone who had limited and realistic expectations about their influence, but nevertheless pushed others into adopting stricter international gun control measures.

== Biography ==
Laurance graduated from the United States Military Academy in 1960. He served as an officer for ten years in the United States Army, and was posted to a combat tour of duty during the Vietnam War. In 1970, he earned an MA in political science from Temple University. In 1973, he earned a Ph.D. from the University of Pennsylvania.

Laurance began his academic career after service in the Army and a teaching appointment at the Naval Postgraduate School in Monterey, California. He joined the Monterey Institute of International Studies (MIIS) in 1991 as a member of the faculty in international policy studies, where he specialized in global governance, armed violence reduction, security studies, arms trafficking, and disarmament. From 2006 to 2009, he served as Dean of the Graduate School of International Policy Studies at the institute, overseeing the academic development of its programs during a period of institutional transition.

In 1999, he helped establish the International Action Network on Small Arms (IANSA), a coalition of non-governmental organizations focused on reducing gun violence and the illicit arms trade. He had earlier acted as the administrator of a preparatory NGO initiative that later evolved into the IANSA network.

Laurance wrote some of the first major reports on small arms in 1996. In 1996 and 1997, He was subsequently appointed expert consultant to the Panel of Experts on Small Arms and Light Weapons, one of the first UN groups to systematically analyze the global circulation of small arms. In 1998–1999 he served as the administrator of the Preparatory Committee for a Global Campaign on Small Arms and Light Weapons, a network of non-governmental organizations that laid the groundwork for the International Action Network on Small Arms (IANSA).

He later played a role in preparations for the 2001 United Nations Conference on the Illicit Trade in Small Arms and Light Weapons in All Its Aspects, contributing to the drafting and adoption of the resulting Programme of Action (PoA), a framework that continues to guide global efforts to combat illicit trafficking.

He advised on the United Nations Register of Conventional Arms (UNROCA), which was established to promote transparency in arms transfers, and worked with the Coordinating Action on Small Arms (CASA), an inter-agency mechanism designed to harmonize UN activities on small arms control. In addition, Laurance contributed to the development of the International Small Arms Control Standards (ISACS), a set of voluntary technical guidelines intended to help states implement effective arms control measures.
