= Remsen Bird =

President of Occidental College and cofounder of the Monterey Institute

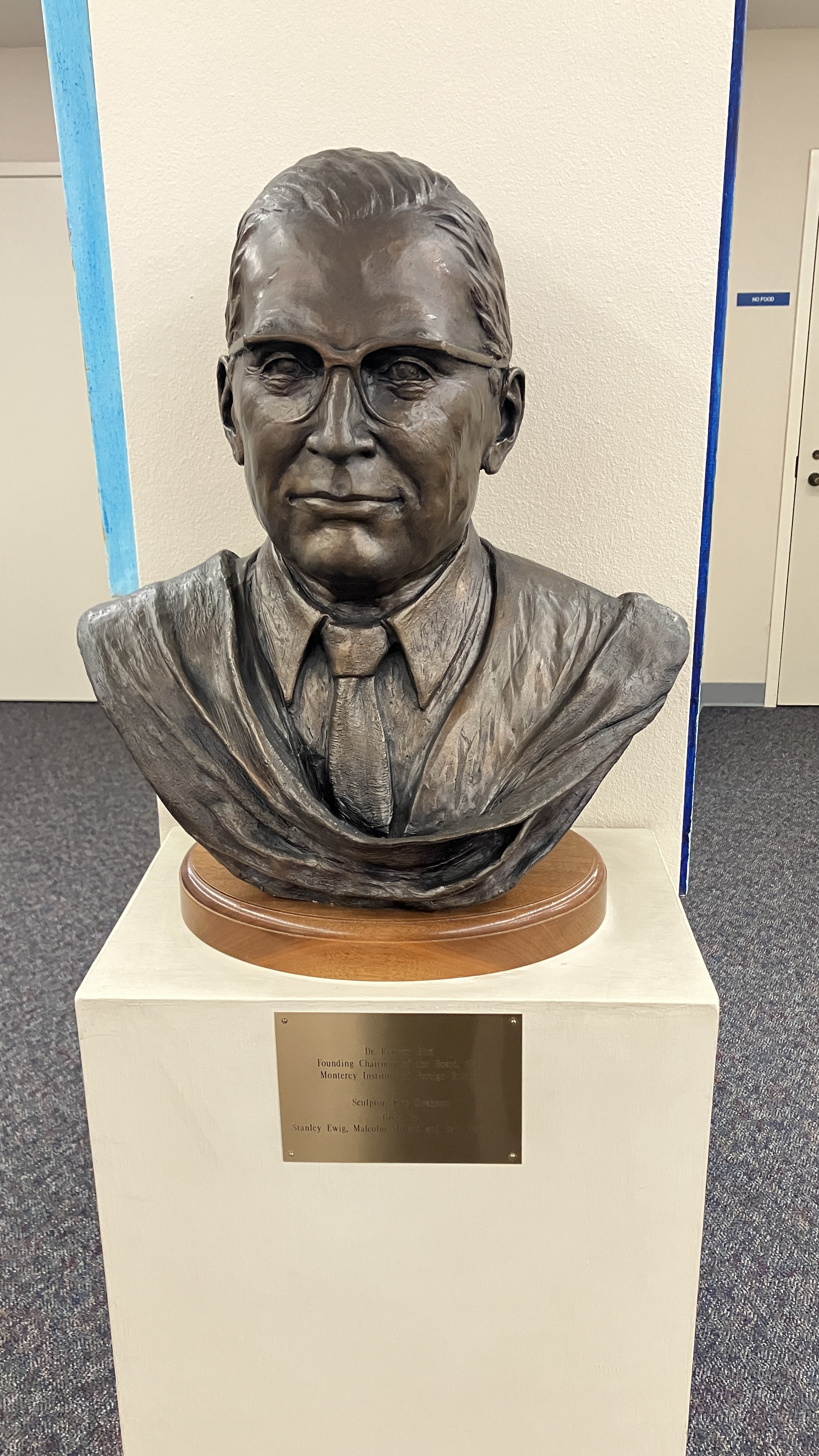

President of Occidental College
- In office 1921–1946

Personal details
- Born: January 3, 1888 New York City
- Died: April 9, 1971 (aged 83)
- Education: Lafayette College

Remsen DuBois Bird (January 3, 1888 - April 9, 1971) was the President of Occidental College from 1921-1946. Bird was a native of New York City and had lost both of his parents by the time he was a teenager. Bird earned degrees from Lafayette College in 1909 and Princeton Theological Seminary in 1912, was ordained in 1912, and studied church history abroad at the University of Berlin for a year. From 1915 to 1921, Bird taught church history at the San Francisco Theological Seminary in San Anselmo, California, interrupted by wartime service with the YMCA in France. Bird's wartime service contributed to his selection as President of Occidental College at just age 33. Bird's 25-year tenure covered tumultuous times in history; his leadership took the College through first the Great Depression and then World War II. Following his presidency of Occidental College, Bird was involved in the founding of the Monterey Institute of Foreign Studies. A character in After Many a Summer Dies the Swan is based on Dr. Bird.
