= Jan Knippers Black =

Human rights professor (1940–2021)

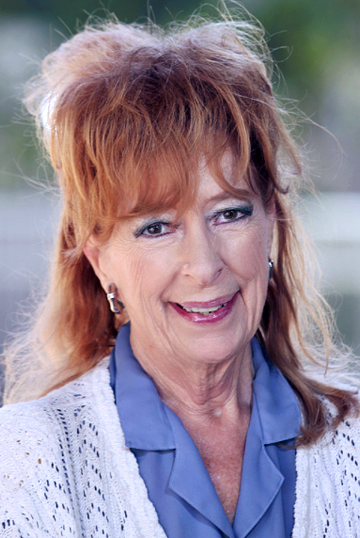
Jan Knippers Black in 2021

Jan Knippers Black (March 10, 1940 – August 15, 2021) was an American professor of Human Rights, International and Comparative Politics of the Western Hemisphere, Women's Rights, and Globalization at the Middlebury Institute of International Studies at Monterey.

== Biography ==
Black was a specialist in international and grassroots development, international and comparative politics, and US foreign policy. Black led the Middlebury Institute's human rights programs for two decades. Black received her PhD from the School of International Service at American University. She served on the board of directors at Amnesty International from 2011 to 2019.

Black was the author of more than a dozen books that examine global politics and human rights. She also served on more than two dozen governing and advisory boards, such as the Advisory Boards of International Political Science Association's Committee on Civil-Military Affairs; the PHD Fellowship Program of the US Inter-American Foundation; and the Global Studies Program of California State University, San Jose.

In 2018, the Jan Knippers Black Fund for Human Rights Protection was launched to promote a speaker series, an alumni award, and the MIIS-Amnesty International USA Fellowship Program.

== Publications ==
- (2010). The Politics of Human Rights Protection, Rowman & Littlefield Publishers INC, ISBN 978-0742540521
- (1999). Inequity in the Global Village: Recycled Rhetoric and Disposable People, Kumarian Press, ISBN 978-1565490994
- (1986). Dominican Republic: Politics and Development in an Unsovereign State, Unwin Hyman, ISBN 978-0044970019
- (1986). Sentinels of Empire: The United States and Latin American Militarism, Praeger, ISBN 978-0313251559
