= Vladislav Krasnov =

Russian and American scholar and writer (born 1937)

Vladislav Krasnov (Russian: Владислав Георгиевич Краснов, Vladislav Georgievich Krasnov; born February 24, 1937) is a Russian and American scholar and writer. While his scholarly works were published with his name spelled as Vladislav Krasnov, his social and political commentary appears under the name W. George Krasnow.

== Biography ==
Vladislav Krasnov was born in Perm in 1937. In 1960 he graduated from Moscow State University with a degree in history and anthropology, and obtained a position with the Swedish service of Radio Moscow. On October 26, 1962, while on a trip to Sweden, he requested political asylum from the Swedish authorities, thus becoming, in the eyes of Soviet authorities, a defector. For several years he studied and lectured in Swedish universities, and in 1966 moved to the United States.

During his US academic career, Vladislav Krasnov obtained a Master's degree in Slavic languages and a Ph.D. in Russian literature from University of Washington (1974). He taught and conducted research at University of Texas, Austin, Southern Methodist University, Monterey Institute of International Studies, and Hoover Institution at Stanford University. He also was a visiting researcher at Sapporo University in Japan.

== The defector study ==
In 1985, Vladislav Krasnov published a book which, according to Peter Reddaway, became the first scholarly study of the phenomenon of "defection" from the Soviet Union. The work summarized several years of research he conducted at Hoover institution using a variety of sources. The most important source for his work was the document he nicknamed "The KGB Wanted List": an internal KGB publication containing a list of some 600 defectors then at large, summarizing the information the Soviet authorities had on each person‘s background, circumstances of their defection, their then-current whereabouts and activities, as well as the information about any in absentia sentences they may have received. The publication had been leaked to the émigré magazine Posev, an organ of the National Alliance of Russian Solidarists. The leaked KGB files were supplemented by a number of other sources, such as records of interviews with a number of defectors conducted by US officials in the 1950s, and materials gleaned from the media.

The collected materials allowed Krasnov to conduct a detailed statistical analysis of the phenomenon of defection throughout the four post-World War II decades.

In his work Vladislav Krasnov also analyzed the attitudes of the American authorities (or the authorities of US allies) toward defectors, or potential defectors. He decried the not too uncommon actions of the US authorities choosing to discourage, or sometimes forcibly expel Soviet sailors, deserters, diplomats, etc. who wanted to "choose freedom". While the cause célèbre of the 1970s was the Simonas Kudirka affair, Krasnov publicized a number of other violations of the non-refoulement principle; as he noted, the authorities too often were guided by the motives of diplomatic expedience or immediate benefits to the US intelligence rather than by humanitarian principles or ideals of freedom. As an example, he contrasted the star treatment of Lt. Viktor Belenko, who flew a valuable MiG-25 fighter to Japan with that of First Lt. Valentin Zosimov, who flew to Iran in an An-2 "crop duster", and was promptly deported back to the USSR and a long prison sentence.
