= Jack Kolbert =

American educator and French teacher (1927-2005)

President of Monterey Institute of Foreign Studies
- In office 1977–1980
- Preceded by: Robert von Pagenhardt
- Succeeded by: William Gregory Craig

President of the Albuquerque City Council
- In office July, 1974 – July, 1977

Personal details
- Born: April 25, 1927 Perth Amboy, New Jersey
- Died: September 25, 2005 (aged 78) Freeburg, Pennsylvania
- Education: University of Paris; Sorbonne University
- Alma mater: University of Southern California; Columbia University
- Orders and degrees: Grand Officer of the Academic Palms; French Order of Merit

Jack Kolbert (April 25, 1927 – September 25, 2005) was a lifelong French teacher and educator in the humanities and social sciences, and briefly served in politics. In the course of his academic career, Kolbert taught at thirteen universities in the United States and France, including; Columbia University, Wesleyan University, the University of Pittsburgh, University of New Mexico, Pomona College, and Susquehanna University. He was the president of the Albuquerque City Council and the president of Monterey Institute of Foreign Studies.

He received two Fulbright fellowships, as well as awards from the Ford Foundation and the Camargo Foundation. In 1975, the French Republic conferred on him the status of hereditary knighthood in recognition of his contributions to education. He was later honored by Presidents Charles de Gaulle, Valéry Giscard d’Estaing, and François Mitterrand, and was admitted to the French Order of Merit and awarded the rank of Grand Officer of the Academic Palms. He also served as an Honorary Consul of France.

== Biography ==
Kolbert graduated from Perth Amboy High School and earned his bachelor’s and master’s degrees at the University of Southern California, in 1948 and 1949 respectively, before pursuing doctoral studies at Columbia University, where he received his Ph.D. in French He also studied at the Sorbonne and was later recognized as a Literary Laureate of the University of Paris.

In 1965, Kolbert moved to Albuquerque, New Mexico, when he accepted a position as a full professor at the University of New Mexico. Between 1969 and 1974, Kolbert served as a regional representative of the American Association of Teachers of French (AATF).

In 1973, while teaching French at UNM, he nominated Elie Wiesel for the Nobel Prize in Literature. Wiesel was later awarded the Nobel Peace Prize in 1986.

Becoming engaged in the local community, Kolbert served as president of the Albuquerque City Council from 1974 to 1977, before suddenly announcing his resignation to take up the position as President of the Monterey Institute of Foreign Studies (MIFS), where he served as Interim in 1977 and was inaugurated on March 11, 1978. He served in that position until 1980. and as an administrator at the California Academy of Sciences in San Francisco.

In 1985, he became a professor of modern languages at Susquehanna University, where he also chaired the department. He retired from Susquehanna in 1996 with the title of Professor Emeritus. During his career, he published ten books and more than 500 articles on French literature and civilization. His final book, published in 2001, was a collaboration with Elie Wiesel on Wiesel’s experiences and reflections on the Holocaust.

He died on September 25, 2005, at the age of 78, after an illness with pancreatic cancer. He had two sons, six grandchildren, and five great-grandchildren.

== Written works ==
- A First French Handbook for Teachers in Elementary Schools, by Jack Kolbert and Harry Goldby. A project under the direction of B. W. Haseltine with the collaboration of D. Paul Jones (1958)
- Edmond Jaloux et sa critique littéraire (1962)
- L'art de Michel Butor. [Edited by] Claude Book-Senninger [and] Jack Kolbert
- The Worlds of André Maurois (1985)
- The Worlds of Elie Wiesel: an overview of his career and his major themes (2001)
