= Gaspard Weiss =

Founder of the Monterey Institute of Foreign Studies (1901–1989)

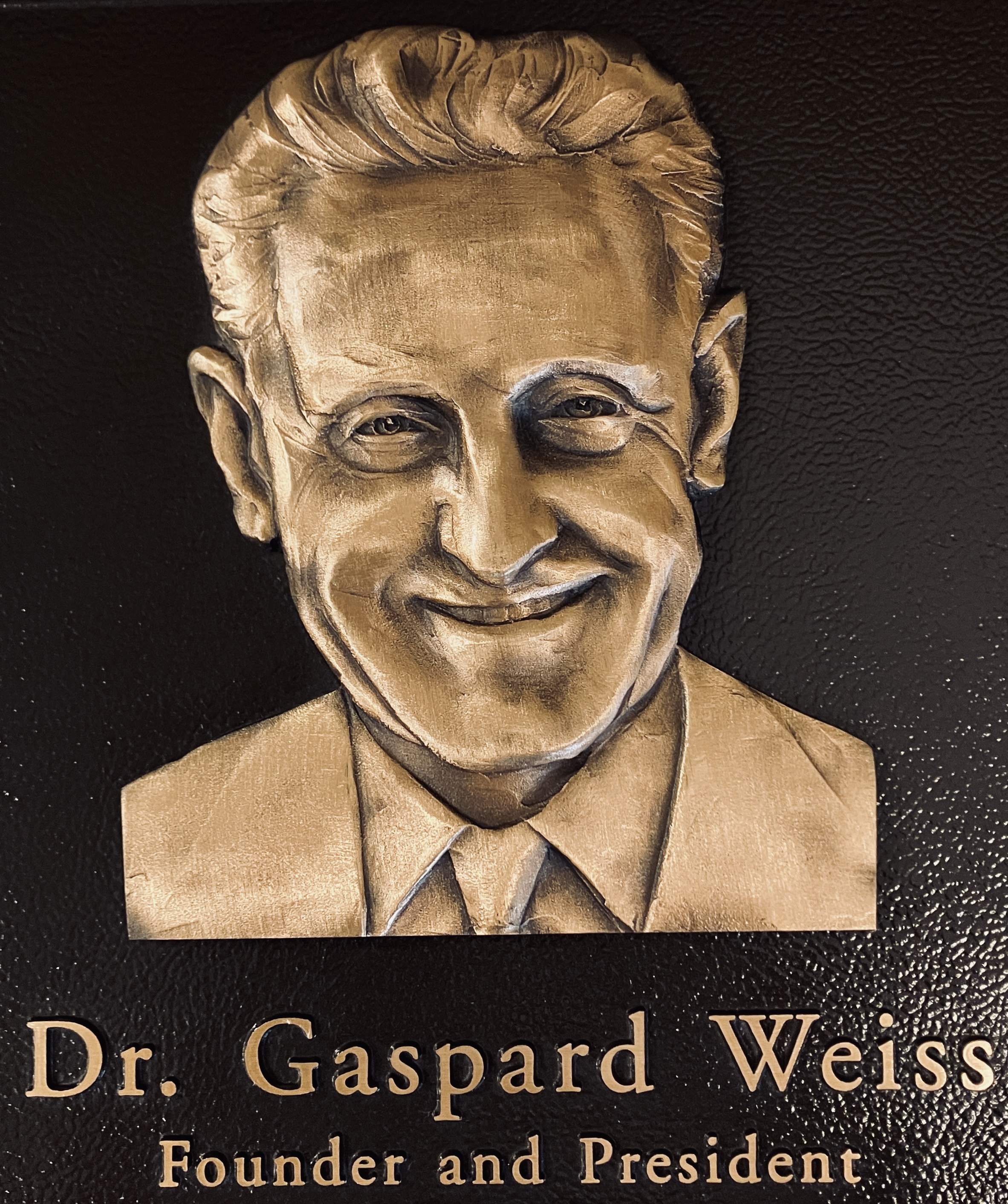

1st President of the Monterey Institute of Foreign Studies
- In office 1955–1968

Chair of the French Department at the Army Language School
- In office 1951–1953

Personal details
- Born: February 1, 1901 7th arrondissement, Paris, France
- Died: April 5, 1989 (aged 88) Monterey, California
- Resting place: Cimetière de Saint-Cloud, Paris
- Education: University of Paris; University of Lausanne

Military service
- Branch/service: French Ministry of the Interior
- Battles/wars: World War II

Gaspard Etienne Weiss (1901–1989) was the founder and served as the first President of the Monterey Institute of Foreign Studies (MIFS), from 1955 to 1968, the longest serving President of the school. Weiss was a graduate of the University of Paris and the University of Lausanne, and formerly an employee of the French government, serving there in an intelligence and propaganda capacity during the height of World War II for the Minister of the Interior. Weiss came to the United States from Paris in 1948 with his wife. Between 1948 and 1951, he taught at Smith College, University of Massachusetts, Mount Holyoke College, and the Ohio State University. Meeting a fellow educator during this time, Dwight Morrow Jr., he was convinced to move to Monterey in 1951. He began teaching French at the Army Language School in June 1951. He was the highest-ranking French instructor at the Presidio of Monterey, and served as the chairman of the French department there.

In 1945, Gaspard and Louise Weiss were convicted by the Cour de Justice de la République at Poitiers of having been Nazi collaborators, the alleged crime of which was having shared intelligence with the Nazis, and were sentenced to 20 years in prison in absentia. In 1952, while serving at the Monterey Language Institute, Weiss was questioned about this by the United Press, and he denied any involvement with the Nazi party. He told the United Press: "I was never a Nazi." Weiss claimed that the 1945 court was a "people's court," that had been established by communists who had a vendetta against him and his wife. Following the newspaper stories, an investigation was carried out by the Sixth Army of the United States, under the command of Lieutenant General Joseph May Swing. The results of the US Army's investigation have not yet been declassified.

Not long after the investigation, in 1953, Weiss left the Presidio to begin teaching classes in Latin at Robert Louis Stevenson High School in Pebble Beach, California. His wife, Louise, also started teaching French there. It was during his time as a teacher at this high school that he had the idea for MIFS, collaborating for several years to achieve the vision for the school.

During his tenure as President of MIFS, the program grew from a summer language school with only 12 students in attendance to a fully-fledged and internationally recognized graduate school. In his final year, he managed to establish MIFS as the first school in the United States which specifically trained students to become translators and interpreters for the United Nations Interpretation Service.

After his tenure as president, in 1968, he moved to Arcata, California to join the faculty of Humboldt State College, later known as California State University at Humboldt, teaching French there until his retirement in 1975.
