= Brian C. Wilson =

Scholar of religion and professor at Western Michigan University

- Born: Santa Clara, California
- Awards: Western Michigan University Distinguished Faculty Scholar Award (2019); Historical Society of Michigan State History Award (2015; 2019)

Academic background
- Education: Stanford University (B.S., 1982); Monterey Institute of International Studies (M.A., 1990); University of California, Santa Barbara (M.A., 1991; Ph.D., 1996)

Academic work
- Discipline: Religious studies
- Sub-discipline: American religious history; new religious movements
- Institutions: Western Michigan University
- Notable works: Dr. John Harvey Kellogg and the Religion of Biologic Living (2014); John E. Fetzer and the Quest for the New Age (2018); The California Days of Ralph Waldo Emerson (2022)

Brian C. Wilson is a professor of American religious history in the Department of World Religions and Cultures at Western Michigan University. His teaching and research address American religious history, new religious movements, religion in the Midwest (including the “Yankee diaspora”), and theory and method in the academic study of religion.

In 2019, Wilson received Western Michigan University’s Distinguished Faculty Scholar Award.

== Early life and education ==
Wilson is a native of Santa Clara, California. He earned a B.S. in Medical Microbiology from Stanford University (1982). After three years in the Peace Corps (Honduras and the Dominican Republic), he completed an M.A. in Hispanic Studies at the Monterey Institute of International Studies (1990), followed by an M.A. (1991) and Ph.D. (1996) in Religious Studies at the University of California, Santa Barbara.

== Academic career ==
Wilson joined the faculty of Western Michigan University in 1996. He served as chair of WMU’s Department of Comparative Religion (later renamed World Religions and Cultures) from Summer 2001 to Fall 2007 and again from Fall 2008 to Fall 2010.

== Research and publications ==
Wilson’s scholarship includes work on religion in the American Midwest, spiritual biography, and the historical intersections of religion, medicine, and culture. His books on figures associated with Michigan’s religious and cultural history include studies of John Harvey Kellogg and John Fetzer; the latter has been reviewed in venues such as Reading Religion (American Academy of Religion).

== Selected works ==
=== Books ===
- Wilson, Brian C. (2014). Dr. John Harvey Kellogg and the Religion of Biologic Living. Indiana University Press.
- Wilson, Brian C. (2018). John E. Fetzer and the Quest for the New Age. Wayne State University Press.
- Wilson, Brian C. (2022). The California Days of Ralph Waldo Emerson. University of Massachusetts Press.
- Wilson, Brian C. (2008). Yankees in Michigan. Michigan State University Press.
- Wilson, Brian C. (1999). Christianity. Prentice Hall.

=== Edited volumes ===
- Idinopulos, Thomas A.; Wilson, Brian C., eds. (1998). What Is Religion?: Origins, Definitions, and Explanations. Brill.

== Awards and honors ==
- Distinguished Faculty Scholar Award, Western Michigan University (2019).
- Historical Society of Michigan State History Award (2015; 2019).
- Independent Publisher Book Award (IPPY) recognition for Dr. John Harvey Kellogg and the Religion of Biologic Living (reported by WMU and the award sponsor).
