= Office of Counterterrorism Finance and Designations =

Former office of the US Bureau of Counterterrorism

CTFD

Agency overview
- Formed: September 23, 2001
- Dissolved: July 1, 2025
- Parent agency: Bureau of Counterterrorism
- Key document: Executive Order 13224

The Office of Counterterrorism Finance and Designations (CTFD) is a former office of the Bureau of Counterterrorism (CT), within the United States Department of State. CTFD identified, developed, and submitted for the Secretary's approval terrorist designations under the authorities of Foreign Terrorist Organization designations, Executive Order 13224, and the State Sponsor of Terrorism list. These authorities froze assets, established a legal basis for material support prosecutions, and exposed and isolated terrorist organizations and individuals.

CTFD was also responsible for formulating CT's finance policy and ensuring that it was integrated with the bureau's broader counterterrorism objectives. In carrying out this work, CTFD collaborated with other offices of the State Department and interagency partners to align and strengthen the bureau's diplomatic efforts against terrorist financing and to provide policy input into its counterterrorism finance programs.

On July 1, 2025, the incoming Trump Administration reorganized the State Department and ended the CTFD's designation capacity.
