= Center for the Blue Economy =

Sustainability and economics research institute

Coordinates: 36.5991°N 121.8970°W

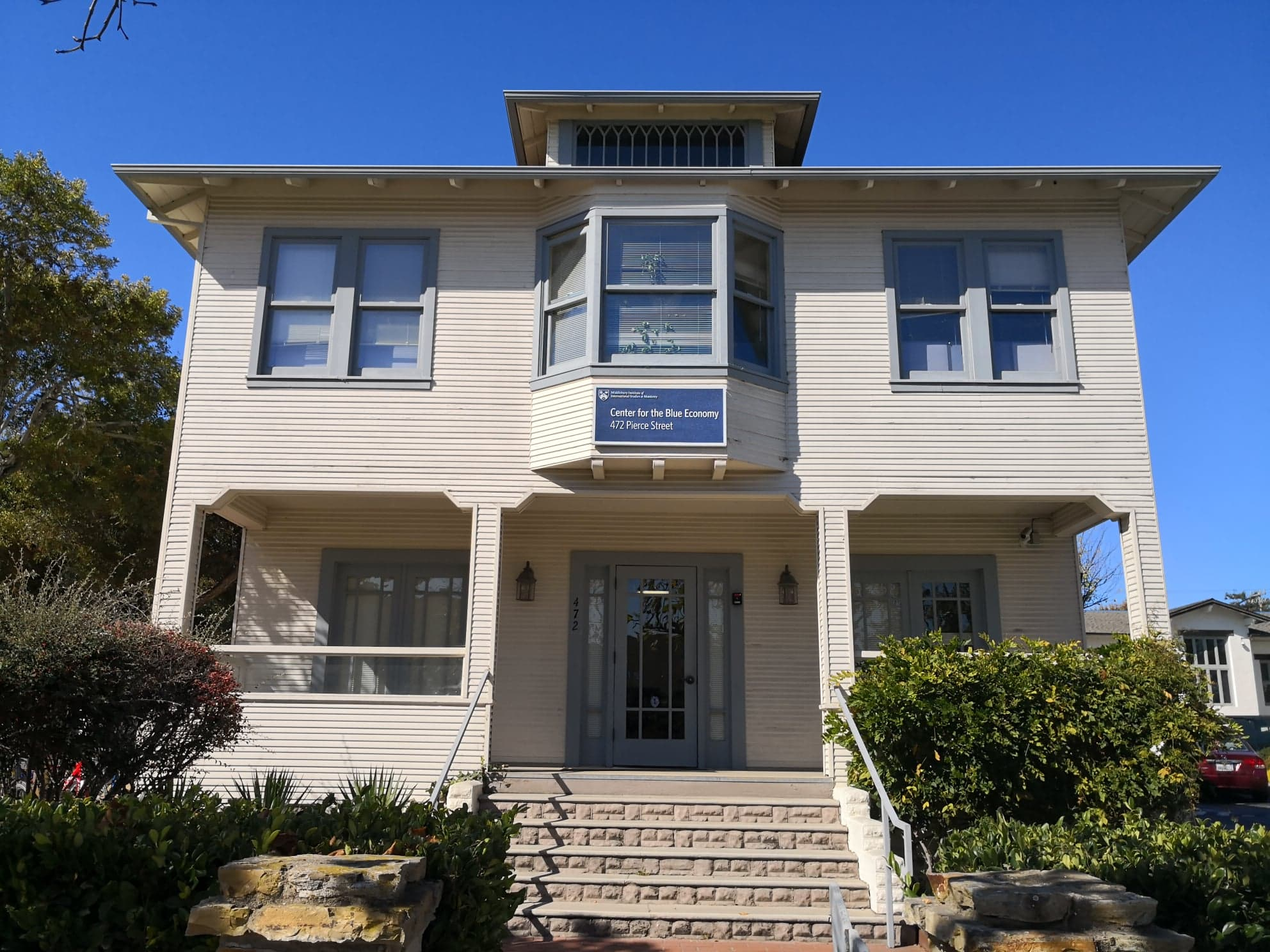
Center for the Blue Economy

The Center for the Blue Economy (CBE) is a research center managed by the Middlebury Institute of International Studies (MIIS) in Monterey, California. The CBE research focuses on the Blue Economy. The CBE was founded in 2011. It received the initial fund of $1 million from Robin and Deborah Hicks, the parents of the Middlebury College students, in their capacities as trustees of the Loker Foundation.

Professor Jason Scorse, who is also the Head/Chair of International Environmental Policy (IEP) program at MIIS, is the Director for the Center for the Blue Economy. The CBE was created to address the issues related to "Blue Economy" in the ocean and coastal areas.

== Research focus ==
The research at the CBE mainly focuses on determining the factors that ensure sustainability and economics of oceans and coastal regions. The research at the center provides open-access data to different stakeholders, including businesses, governments, nonprofits that could help them to make decisions for managing ocean and coastal resources. The research also focuses on climate change adaptation in coastal areas, governing the environmental issues and providing possible solutions considering the ocean and coastal issues. The center collaborates with various local and national organizations and they worked on a wide range of topics related to ocean and coastal areas. The center also offers specialization course of Ocean and Coastal Resource Management(OCRM) for the IEP program.

== CBE Advisory Council ==
The CBE Advisory Council has experts from different backgrounds and experiences including marine science, policy and business. The team aims to make a change and shape the future of blue economy. The organogram of the CBE Advisory Council is shown in Figure.

=== Grants and funding ===
The CBE 2018 received grants from three major sources:71% federal government, 28% state and local agencies, and 1% other sources.

== Speaker series ==
The CBE hosts the Speakers Series which are events where professionals from different background share their knowledge with students and community members. There are two different kinds of Speakers Series: The Sustainability Speaker Series and the CBE Speakers Series. The Sustainability Speakers Series is administered by the Center for Blue Economy and is funded by the Hayward Family Foundation of a local company, Hayward Lumber. The Sustainability Speakers series includes a broad range of topics like oceans, atmosphere, social justice, etc. The Sustainability Speaker Series is open to the Public and is free.

The CBE Speaker Series (also known as OCRM Speaker Series), is part of the class requirements for students seeking the Ocean and Coastal Resource Management (OCRM) concentration and is also open to students in other concentrations and the public. The CBE Speakers Series is funded by the Center for Blue Economy and includes a variety of topics related to ocean and coastal management. The main objective of CBE Speaker Series is to bring a variety of possible career tracks and contacts to the students. Previous guests at the Speakers Series include Ambassador David Balton and IEP alumna Clessi Bennet. The CBE has been organizing both the Speakers Series since 2011.
