= Countering violent extremism =

Non-coercive actions to oppose violent extremism

Countering Violent Extremism (CVE), also known as Preventing Violent Extremism (PVE), and Preventing and Countering Violent Extremism (P/CVE) refers to nonviolent (mostly non-military), proactive measures aimed at preventing or disrupting attempts by violent extremist individuals and groups to radicalize, recruit, or mobilize individuals. It also seeks to address the underlying conditions that contribute to radicalization and recruitment. CVE initiatives typically include policies and programs that expand opportunities for peaceful political, economic, and social participation, and that strengthen the capacity of communities and local authorities to make use of these options.

Unlike counterterrorism (CT), CVE is not a securitized approach. Where counterterrorism is designed for law enforcement and militaries to use violent means to combat terrorism, CVE is designed to use peaceful, non-coercive methods. The difference also lies in the phase of the development of CVE programs, usually towards the beginning of the radicalization process.

Key elements of CVE programs typically include community-based engagement and deradicalization initiatives aimed at vulnerable youth, measures to address extremist content online, and rehabilitation efforts for convicted offenders, often involving psychological and/or religious counseling. CVE is frequently framed within a public health approach, which identifies program targets at three levels: local communities, individuals considered at risk, and those already convicted of extremist offenses.

Following the September 11 attacks, in both the United States and the United Kingdom, CVE has been criticized heavily as a smokescreen for the government to create a large security apparatus, and as an excuse to infiltrate local mosques and other religious communities.

== See also ==
- Christchurch Call
- Deprogramming
- Genocide prevention
- Incitement laws
