= Gordon M. Hahn =

Geopolitical researcher

Gordon M. Hahn is a researcher specializing in Islam and politics in Russia and Eurasia, international relations in Eurasia and terrorism in Eurasia. He is the author of several books and a number of research articles on Russia and the Caucasus Emirate. Hahn gives media interviews on the global Jihadist movement.

Hahn's 2007 book was listed as an "Outstanding Academic Title" in Choice: Current Reviews for Academic Libraries.

== Books ==
- Ukraine Over the Edge: Russia, the West and the New "Cold War" (2018), Jefferson, NC: McFarland & Company.
- The Caucasus Emirate Mujahedin: Global Jihadism in Russia's North Caucasus and Beyond (2014).
- Russia’s Islamic Threat (2007), Yale University Press.
- Russia’s Revolution From Above: Reform, Transition, and Revolution in the Fall of the Soviet Communist Regime, 1985-2000 (2002).
