= José Aybar =

American academic

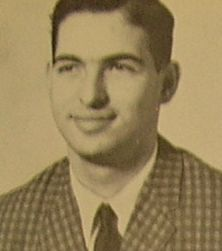
José Aybar

José M. Aybar, full name José Manuel Aybar de Soto, is the former president of Richard J. Daley College in Chicago, one of the City Colleges of Chicago. He has attracted nationwide attention for his innovative approach to remedial instruction at the college level, which has led to a doubling of pass rates for students in remedial courses at Daley College.

Aybar was one of only two presidents in the City Colleges system to be retained after a 2011 leadership shakeup by incoming mayor Rahm Emanuel. As the Latino president of a college serving a majority-Latino student body, he has been profiled as a key Hispanic leader in higher education by Hispanic Outlook and Latino Leaders Magazine.

In addition to his native languages English and Spanish, Aybar is fluent in Russian and proficient in French.

== Early life and education ==
Aybar is a native of Puerto Rico, where his father worked as a physician and hospital administrator in San Juan.

For his undergraduate studies, Aybar attended Shimer College, graduating with a Bachelor of Science degree. Shimer, a very small Great Books college then located in Mount Carroll, Illinois, emphasizes small discussion classes, shared inquiry, and interdisciplinary integration.

Aybar continued his studies at the Monterey Institute of International Studies in California, where he received his MA. His thesis was on the subject of "Cuba and Guatemala." He joined the Caribbean Review as an associate editor.

Aybar completed his Ph.D. in international relations at the Claremont Graduate School, with a dissertation on the topic of "The Guatemalan agrarian reform of 1952". Aybar's first book, Dependency and intervention: the case of Guatemala in 1954, was also published.

== Administrative career ==
My lifetime focus has been the pursuit of higher education and the process of shared inquiry as a means of supporting students to achieve their professional and career dreams/goals.

— José Aybar, Latino Leaders Magazine, May 2012

Aybar served as director of the state of Florida's Latin American and Caribbean Basin Scholarship Program. He subsequently worked at the James F. Byrnes International Center at the University of South Carolina.

Later, at Colorado Mountain College (CMC), he served as dean of the Vail/Eagle Valley campus. In addition to his administrative work at CMC, he led a great books discussion group for local residents.

Aybar joined the administration of the City Colleges of Chicago in 2003, after completing his contract at CMC. From late 2003 to 2009, he served as Associate Vice Chancellor for Arts and Sciences. In this capacity he became the first in the City Colleges system to receive the "Administrator of the Year" award in 2004.

Aybar was appointed president of Daley College in August 2009, as part of a system-wide reshuffle. His administration was quickly hailed by union leader Perry Buckley as an improvement over his predecessor. As president of Daley, Aybar oversees more than 200 faculty and more than 8,000 students, the majority of whom are Hispanic.

The City Colleges of Chicago are controlled by the city government, and thus the city college administrators ultimately report to the mayor. When Rahm Emanuel replaced Richard M. Daley as Chicago mayor in 2011, a second system-wide shakeup ensued, in which a majority of the system's presidents were replaced. Emanuel cited flat enrollment and a 7% graduation rate as the reasons. Aybar was one of only two to be retained, with reports at the time crediting the progress he had made in improving enrollment numbers and student support.

=== Remedial education reform ===
As president of Daley, Aybar spearheaded the implementation of a program called "CASH-to-ROI", standing for "Comprehensive Academic Support and Help to Return on Investment". The CASH-to-ROI program addressed the problem of remedial instruction which has increasingly confronted many US colleges, especially community colleges. The curriculum and materials for the program were developed by Aybar together with other members of the Daley College faculty and administration, and center around a science fiction narrative, which was chosen in order to eliminate any advantages that might come from background knowledge. The program emphasizes small discussion groups, shared inquiry, and interdisciplinary integration.

Beginning in 2011, the CASH-to-ROI program supplemented the existing remedial courses with mandatory group study sessions. As of 2012, the groups of between 7 and 10 students and one facilitator meet for eight 90-minute sessions during the semester to work through the program materials. Although it initially consisted solely of readings and discussion, beginning in 2012, the program was supplemented with computer instruction as well.

CASH-to-ROI doubled the pass rate among students at Daley receiving remedial instruction, from 40% to 80-90%. Aybar described it as "the most exciting project, in all my years in higher education, that I've ever collaborated on." However, the program has been criticized by Buckley and others for its top-down implementation and the choice of metrics used to measure its success.

== Writings ==
- The Guatemalan agrarian reform of 1952 (1977)
- Dependency and intervention: the case of Guatemala in 1954, ISBN 0891581928 (1978)
- "'Walking the Talk:' The Holmes Group Principles in Action" (coauthor). International Journal: Continuous Improvement Monitor, 1:2.
