= Sunder Ramaswamy =

Indian-American economist

- சுந்தர் ராமசாமி
- Born: 1964 (age 61–62); Chennai, India
- Education: St. Stephen's College, Delhi; Delhi University; Purdue University
- Occupation: Professor of International Economics at Middlebury College
- Years active: 1990–present
- Known for: Economist and higher education administrator
- Website: https://www.sunderramaswamy.com/

Sunder Ramaswamy is an Indian-American economist and higher education administrator. He is the Distinguished College Professor of International Economics and the Director of the International and Global Studies Program at Middlebury College in Vermont, where he has served on the faculty since 1990.

Ramaswamy served as the President of the Monterey Institute of International Studies (now the Middlebury Institute of International Studies at Monterey) from 2009 to 2015. From 2017 to 2021, he served as the inaugural Vice Chancellor of Krea University in India. He is also the Chairman Emeritus of The Asia Foundation in San Francisco.

== Education ==
Ramaswamy received his bachelor's degree in economics from St. Stephen’s College, University of Delhi. He earned his M.A. in economics from the Delhi School of Economics, followed by an M.S. and Ph.D. in economics from Purdue University.

== Career ==
In 1990, Ramaswamy joined the economics department at Middlebury College. In 2002, he was appointed the Frederick C. Dirks Professor of International Economics. During his time at Middlebury, he served as the chair of the economics department for three terms, Acting Dean of the Faculty (2006–2007), and Dean for Faculty Development and Research (2007–2008). In 2003, he was awarded the Marjorie Lamberti Faculty Appreciation Award for excellence in teaching. Recently, he was appointed Director of the International and Global Studies program and served on the President's task force for "Middlebury's Approach to AI" (2023–2024).

From 2009 to 2015, Ramaswamy served as President of the Monterey Institute of International Studies (MIIS) in California. During his tenure, he oversaw the academic reorganization and successful merger of MIIS into Middlebury College in 2010. The institute also introduced several new graduate degree programs and research centers, including the Centre for the Blue Economy and the Centre for Conflict Studies.

In India, Ramaswamy was the Director and Professor of Economics at the Madras School of Economics from 2004 to 2005, returning as Officiating Director and Visiting Professor from 2015 to 2017. In 2017, he became the inaugural Vice Chancellor of Krea University in Sri City, near Chennai. He oversaw the launch and early development of the university, including the School of Interwoven Arts and Sciences (SIAS) and the integration of the IFMR Graduate School of Business.

Ramaswamy has acted as a consultant on development economics projects for organizations including UNCTAD, UNIDO, and the World Bank. He has delivered over 175 lectures globally on globalization, economic development, and Indian economic reforms.

Additionally, Ramaswamy has served on several boards. Following a tenure as Chairman, he was appointed Chairman Emeritus of The Asia Foundation. He has also served on the Executive Committee of the American International School of Chennai (2016–2020), the Vienna Center for Disarmament and Non-Proliferation (2011–2015), and is an appointed Ambassador for Indiaspora, a non-profit organization supporting the Indian diaspora.

== Selected publications ==
- Development and Democracy: New Perspectives on an Old Debate (Co-edited with Jeffrey W. Cason). University Press of New England, 2003.
- Social Capital and Economic Development: Well-Being in Developing Countries (Co-edited with Jonathan Isham and Thomas Kelly). Edward Elgar Publishers, 2002.
- The Middlebury Bicentennial Series in International Studies (Co-edited with Michael Geisler and Neil Waters). University Press of New England Press, 1999–2003.
- The Economics of Agricultural Technology in Semi-Arid Sub-Saharan Africa (with John H. Sanders and Barry I. Shapiro). Johns Hopkins University Press, 1996.
- Economics: An Honors Companion (with Kailash Khandke, Jenifer Gamber, and David Colander). Maxi Press/Richard D. Irwin Publishers, 1995.
