= Philip Mazzei =

Italian physician and philosopher (1730–1816)

- Filippo Mazzei
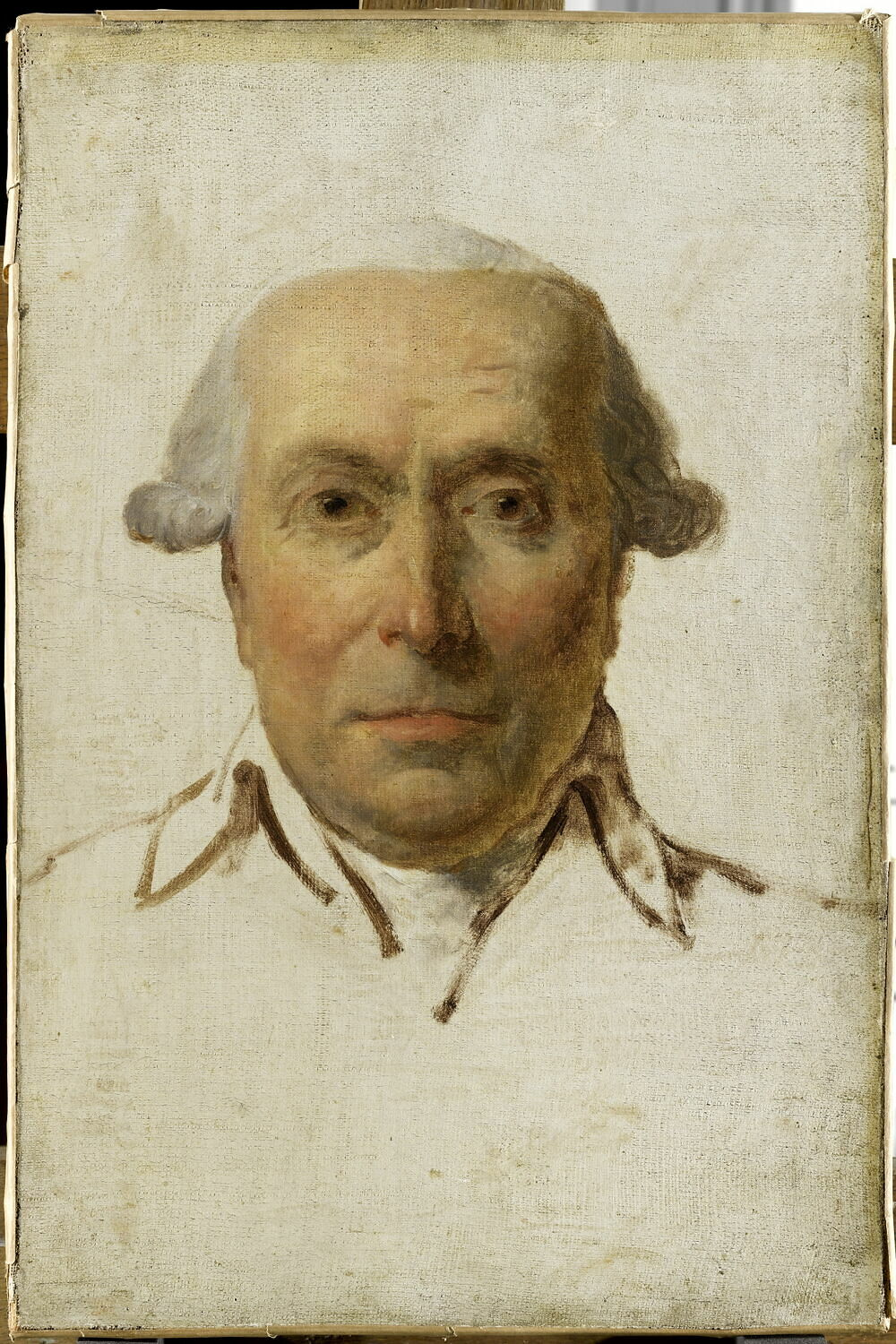
- Portrait by Jacques-Louis David, c. 1790
- Born: Filippo Mazzei; 25 December 1730; Poggio a Caiano, Grand Duchy of Tuscany
- Died: 19 March 1816 (aged 85); Pisa, Grand Duchy of Tuscany
- Occupations: Physician; philosopher; diplomat; winemaker; merchant; author
- Years active: 1752–1816

Philip Mazzei (25 December 1730 – 19 March 1816), originally Filippo Mazzei (Italian pronunciation: [fiˈlippo matˈtsɛi]), and sometimes erroneously cited as Philip Mazzie, was an Italian physician, philosopher, diplomat, winemaker, merchant, and author. A neighbor of Thomas Jefferson, he was a supporter of the American Revolution and the American colonies' war for independence from Britain.

== Biography ==
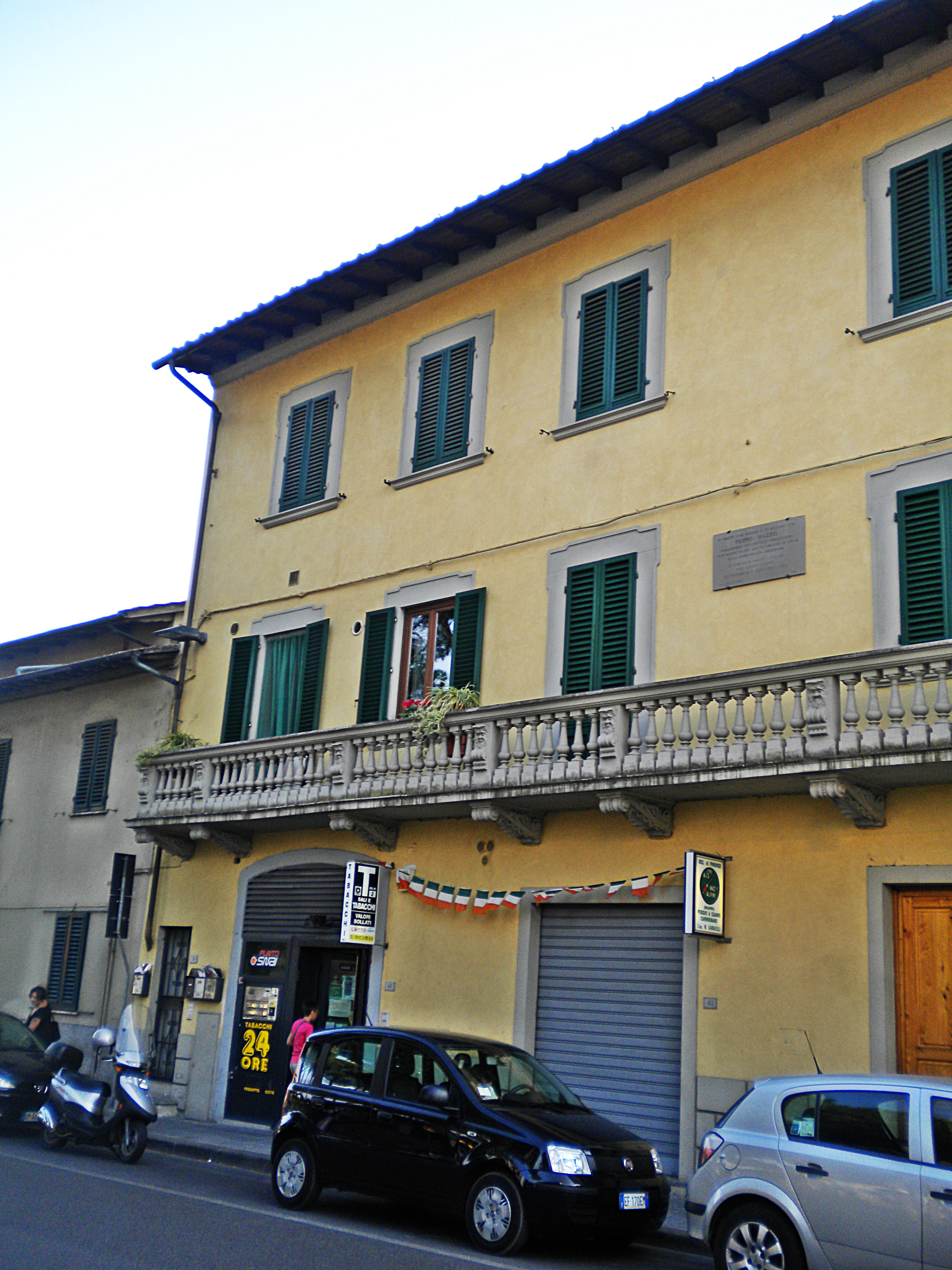
Birthplace of Filippo Mazzei in Poggio a Caiano

Filippo Mazzei was born on 25 December 1730 in Poggio a Caiano in the Grand Duchy of Tuscany as a son of Domenico and Elisabetta. After his studies in medicine between Prato and Florence, in 1752, following disagreements with his older brother Jacopo over the management of the family heritage, he settled in Pisa and then in Livorno, practicing as a doctor but after only two years he left the city and moved to Smyrna (then part of the Ottoman Empire) as a surgeon following a local doctor.

Mazzei practiced medicine in the Middle East for several years before moving to London in 1755 to take up a mercantile career as an importer.

In London, he worked as a teacher of Italian language. While in London he met the American Benjamin Franklin. While doing work for Franklin, Mazzei shared his idea of importing Tuscan products, wine and olive trees, to the New World. Here Filippo Mazzei will cultivate vineyards, olives, and other Mediterranean fruit with the help of Italians.

On 2 September 1773, Mazzei boarded a ship from Livorno to the Colony of Virginia, bringing with him plants, seeds, silkworms, and 10 farmers from Lucca. He was also joined by a widow, Maria Martin, whom he married in 1778, and his friend Carlo Bellini who between 1779 and 1803 would become the first teacher of Italian at an American university, the College of William & Mary in Virginia.

He visited Jefferson at his estate, and the two became good friends. Jefferson gave Mazzei an allotment of land for an experimental plantation. Mazzei purchased more land adjoining this gift of acreage and established a plantation he named Colle. They shared an interest in politics and liberal values, and maintained an active correspondence for the rest of Mazzei's life.

In 1774, he published a pamphlet containing the phrase "All men are by nature equally free and independent".

In 1779, following the emergence of the independent United States after the colonial victory in the American Revolutionary War, Mazzei returned to Italy as a secret agent for Virginia, tasked with securing a loan and purchasing military supplies in Italy. During the voyage, his ship was seized by a British privateer. Suspecting betrayal by his captain, Mazzei threw overboard a pouch containing his credentials and the political instructions from the Virginian authorities. He eventually reached La Rochelle, in France, but was unable to engage in official negotiations. He subsequently made his way to Italy and between 1781 and 1782 lived in Tuscany, where he attempted to build ties with the United States. The initiative failed, as the Grand Duke, Leopold, expected a British victory in the war and was distrustful. Mazzei returned to Paris and, after residing in the United States again between 1783 and 1785, he travelled throughout Europe promoting republican ideals. His wife remained in the United States until her death in 1788 at the estate, which Mazzei had donated in 1783 to his stepdaughter, Margherita Maria Martini and to her husband, the Frenchman Justin Pierre Plumard, Count De Rieux.

He wrote a political history of the American Revolution, Recherches historiques et politiques sur les États-Unis de l'Amerique septentrionale, and published it in Paris in 1788. It was the first history of the American Revolution published in French. The work is still a valuable source of information on the movement that sparked the American Revolution.

While in the Polish–Lithuanian Commonwealth he became attached as a Privy Councilor at the court of King Stanislaus II. There he became acquainted with Polish liberal and constitutional thought, like the works of Wawrzyniec Grzymała Goślicki and ideas of Golden Freedoms and Great Sejm. King Stanislaus appointed Mazzei to be Poland's representative in Paris, where he again met Jefferson.

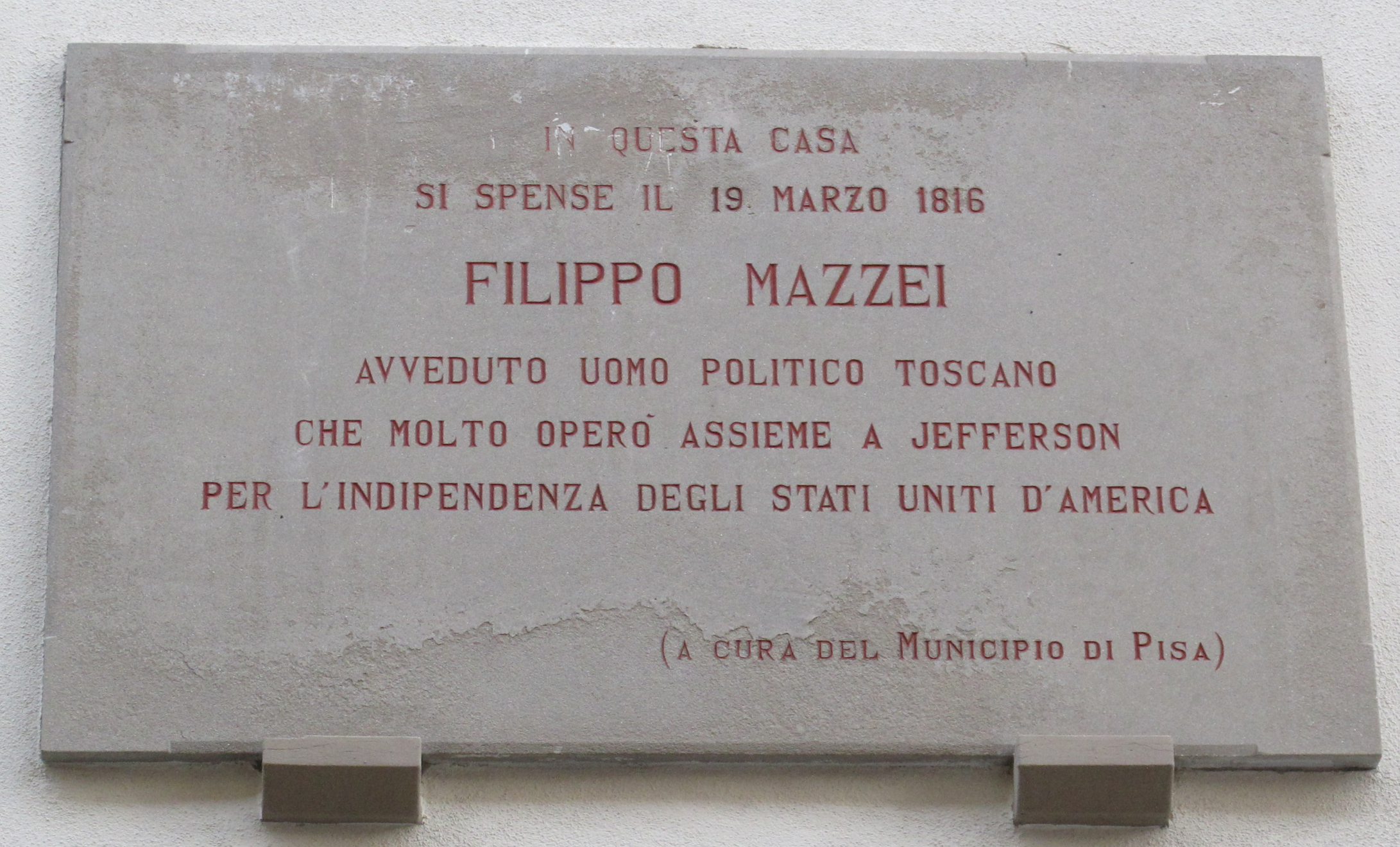
Commemorative plaque in Pisa on the facade of the house where Mazzei died

After Poland was partitioned between Russia and Prussia in 1795, Mazzei, along with the rest of the Polish court, was given a pension by the Russian crown. He later spent more time in France, becoming active in the politics of the French Revolution under the Directorate. When Napoleon overthrew that government Mazzei returned definitively to Tuscany, settling in Pisa where in 1796 he married Antonina Tonini, with whom he had a daughter, Elisabetta, in 1798.

Mazzei always remained nostalgic for Virginia and his American friends, who hoped for his return and with whom he never interrupted his epistolary contact. He died in Pisa on 19 March 1816 without ever returning to America. After his death, the remainder of his family returned to the United States at the urging of Jefferson. They settled in Massachusetts and Virginia.

He was buried at the Suburbano Cemetery in Pisa.

=== The friendship between Mazzei and Jefferson ===
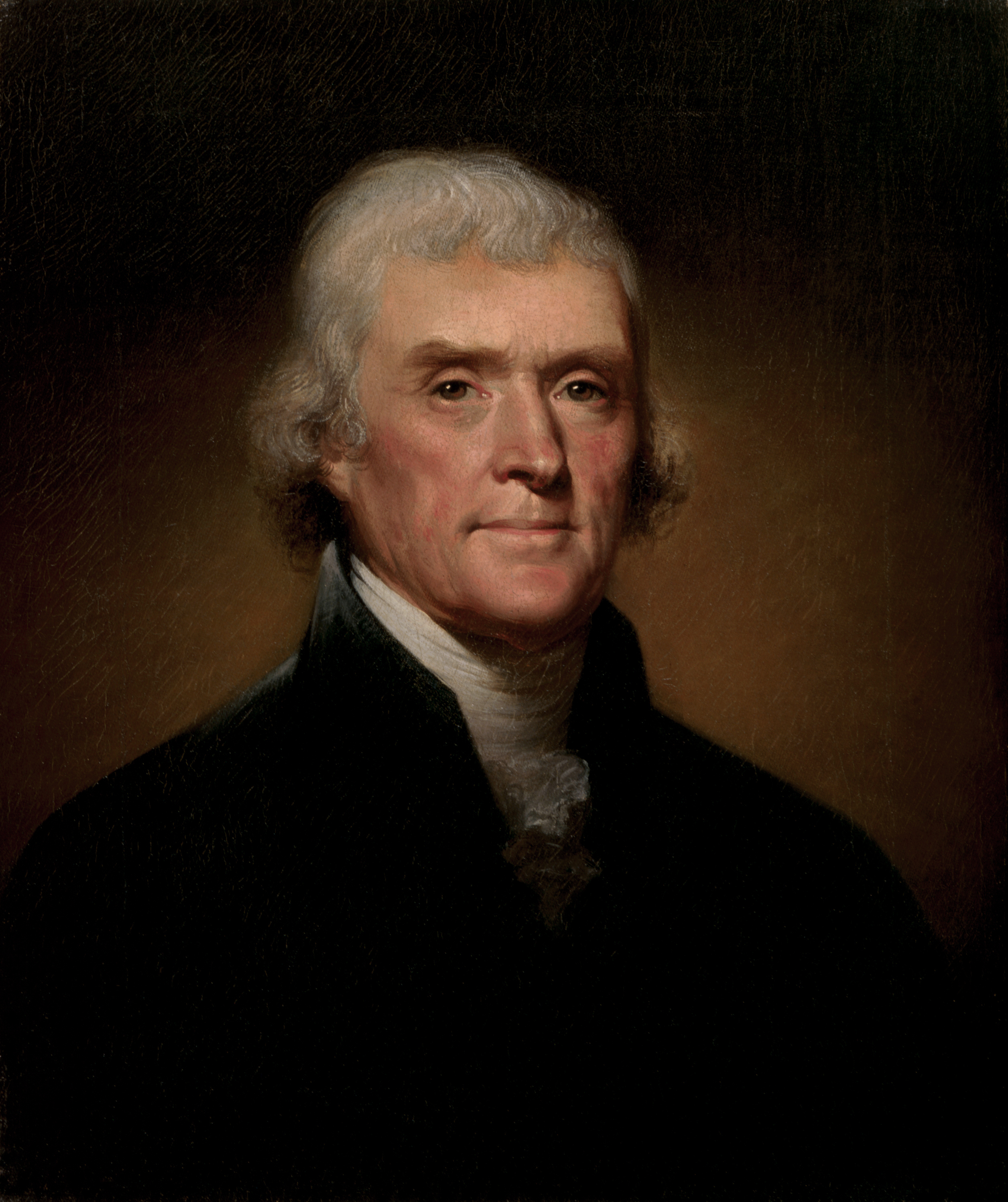
Thomas Jefferson, the 3rd President of the United States

The friendship between Thomas Jefferson and Filippo Mazzei is attested by the numerous letters they exchanged, an estimate that was confirmed in letters to third parties:

[Mazzei] possesses first rate abilities .... He has been a zealous whig from the beginning and I think may be relied on perfectly in point of integrity. He is very sanguine in his expeditions of the services he could render us on this occasion and would undertake it on a very moderate appointment.

— Letter from Thomas Jefferson to John Hancock, 19 October 1778

I am induced to this quick reply to [your letter] by an alarming paragraph in it, which is that Mazzei is coming to Annapolis. I tremble at the idea. I know he will be worse to me than a return of my double quotidian head-ach.

— Letter from Thomas Jefferson to James Madison, 16 March 1784

[A]n intimacy of 40. years had proved to me his great worth; and a friendship, which had begun in personal acquaintance, was maintained after separation, without abatement, by a constant interchange of letters. his esteem too in this country was very general; his early & zealous cooperation in the establishment of our independance having acquired for him here a great degree of favor.

— Letter from Thomas Jefferson to Giovanni Carmignani, 18 July 1816

Your letters ... brought me the first information of the death of my antient friend Mazzei, which I learn with sincere regret. he had some peculiarities, & who of us has not? but he was of solid worth; honest, able, zealous in sound principles moral & political, constant in friendship, and punctual in all his undertakings. he was greatly esteemed in this country.

— Letter from Thomas Jefferson to Thomas Appleton, 18 July 1816

Many biographers believe Jefferson and George Washington had a falling out over a letter Jefferson sent to Mazzei in Italy, which called the Washington Administration "Anglican, monarchical, and aristocratical," and claimed that Washington had appointed as military officers "all timid men that prefer the calm of despotism to the boisterous sea of liberty ... [I]t would give you a fever were I to name to you the apostates who have gone over to these heresies, men who were Samsons in the field and Solomons in the council, but who have had their heads shorn by the harlot England." The letter was eventually published overseas and then re-translated back into English by Noah Webster and published in the United States.

=== Colle and the vineyards in Virginia ===
Thanks to the friendship with Thomas Jefferson, he settled in Virginia since 1773 at Jefferson's invitation, he built Colle, an estate in Albemarle County, Virginia, near Monticello. The name, taken from Italian and meaning "hill". The original house, built around 1774, no longer stands; the present building, in the French Colonial Revival style, dates from 1940.

==== History ====
In September 1773, Mazzei sailed from Livorno for Virginia, bringing Tuscan farmers, European grapevines, and other Mediterranean plants. He was originally bound for Augusta County, where the Virginia legislature had promised him land, but stopped along the way at Monticello to meet Jefferson. Jefferson persuaded him to settle nearby as a neighbor and gave him a 193-acre tract south of his own property. Between 1774 and 1778, Mazzei acquired about 700 additional acres and named his farm Colle, after Colle di Val d'Elsa, a Tuscan town whose surrounding landscape he took as a model. In 1774, he purchased 281 acres, built a house there, and began clearing the land to plant vines.

Early in 1774, Mazzei announced the formation of a company "for the purpose of raising and making wine, oil, agruminous plants, and silk," which drew subscriptions from several colonists, including Jefferson and George Washington. In May of that year, a late frost destroyed much of the newly planted vines. Despite the setback, Mazzei remained confident in Virginia's suitability for viticulture; in a letter to Washington, he wrote that once the country was settled in proportion to its extent, the finest wine in the world would be made there.

In 1779, Mazzei traveled to Europe as Virginia's agent to secure loans to help finance the American Revolutionary War. During his absence, he leased Colle to the Prussian general Friedrich Adolf Riedesel, a prisoner of war held at the nearby Albemarle Barracks. Jefferson later recounted that the general's horses "destroyed the whole labour of three or four years" in a single week, ending an experiment that, in his view, would have succeeded within another year or two.

Mazzei returned to Virginia in 1783 without receiving the consular appointment he had hoped for, and left the country for good in 1785. Before departing, he gave Colle to his stepdaughter, Maria Margherita Martini, and her husband, Justin Pierre Plumard, Comte de Rieux. Mazzei's wife remained at Colle until her death in 1788 and was buried in the Jefferson family graveyard at Monticello.

Jefferson continued to manage Mazzei's affairs in Virginia. In April 1790, he wrote that if Mazzei returned to settle at Colle himself, "all your arrangements would be to begin anew". In January 1792, he reported that he had sold the property to a Mr. Thomas for £250, while warning of the buyer's uncertain solvency and describing the estate as being in "a ruinous state" that Mazzei "can have no conception of". That sale did not go through, and the property was ultimately sold in the spring of 1796 for a mere two dollars an acre. In April 1796, Jefferson was still handling "the balance which will remain for Colle after deducting the little matter due to me", and by 1800 acknowledged having let "the proceeds of Colle lie unsettled & but partly collected".

Through the nineteenth century, the estate was subdivided and passed through several owners, at various times used for livestock or fruit orchards. The original house was dismantled in the 1930s. In 1939, Stanley and Shirley Woodward purchased the land and built a new house on the foundations of Mazzei's original dwelling. Beginning in 1981, part of the estate was replanted with vines under the name Jefferson Vineyards, with the involvement of Italian winemaker Gabriele Rausse. In January 2023, the Thomas Jefferson Foundation acquired the property for $11.75 million.

==== Architecture ====
The house Mazzei built around 1774 had a telescopic plan, a form characteristic of rural dwellings of the period in Albemarle County. The building was demolished, and no visible remains of its original structure survive.

The present house, completed in 1940 for the diplomat Stanley Woodward, was built on the foundations of Mazzei's dwelling and designed in the French Colonial Revival style by the architect William Adams Delano. Delano, a partner in the firm Delano & Aldrich, worked chiefly within the Beaux-Arts tradition and later in the neo-Georgian and neo-Federal styles, for a residential and institutional clientele in the northeastern United States.

== Mazzei's writings ==
=== In English ===
- Filippo Mazzei. My Life and Wanderings. Translated by S. Eugene Scalia. Edited by Margherita Marchione. Morristown, NJ: American Institute of Italian Studies, 1980. ISBN 0-916322-03-3.

=== In French ===
- Filippo Mazzei: Recherches Historiques et Politiques sur les Etats-Unis de l'Amérique Septentrionale (Historical and Political Enquiries Concerning the United States of North America), 2019. Four Volumes. ISBN 978-1011472581
- Filippo Mazzei, Stanisław August Poniatowski, Lettres de Philippe Mazzei et du roi Stanislas-Auguste de Pologne, Roma : Istituto storico italiano per l'età moderna e contemporanea, 1982 [ISBN unspecified]

=== In Italian ===
- Filippo Mazzei: Memorie della vita e delle peregrinazioni del fiorentino Filippo Mazzei, edited by Gino Capponi, Lugano, Tip. della Svizzera Italiana, 1845–1846, 2 volumes [ISBN unspecified]
- Filippo Mazzei: Del commercio della seta fatto in Inghilterra dalla Compagnia delle Indie Orientali (manoscritto inedito di Filippo Mazzei – 1769), edited by Silvano Gelli, Poggio a Caiano, Comune di Poggio a Caiano, 2001. [ISBN unspecified]

== Influence ==
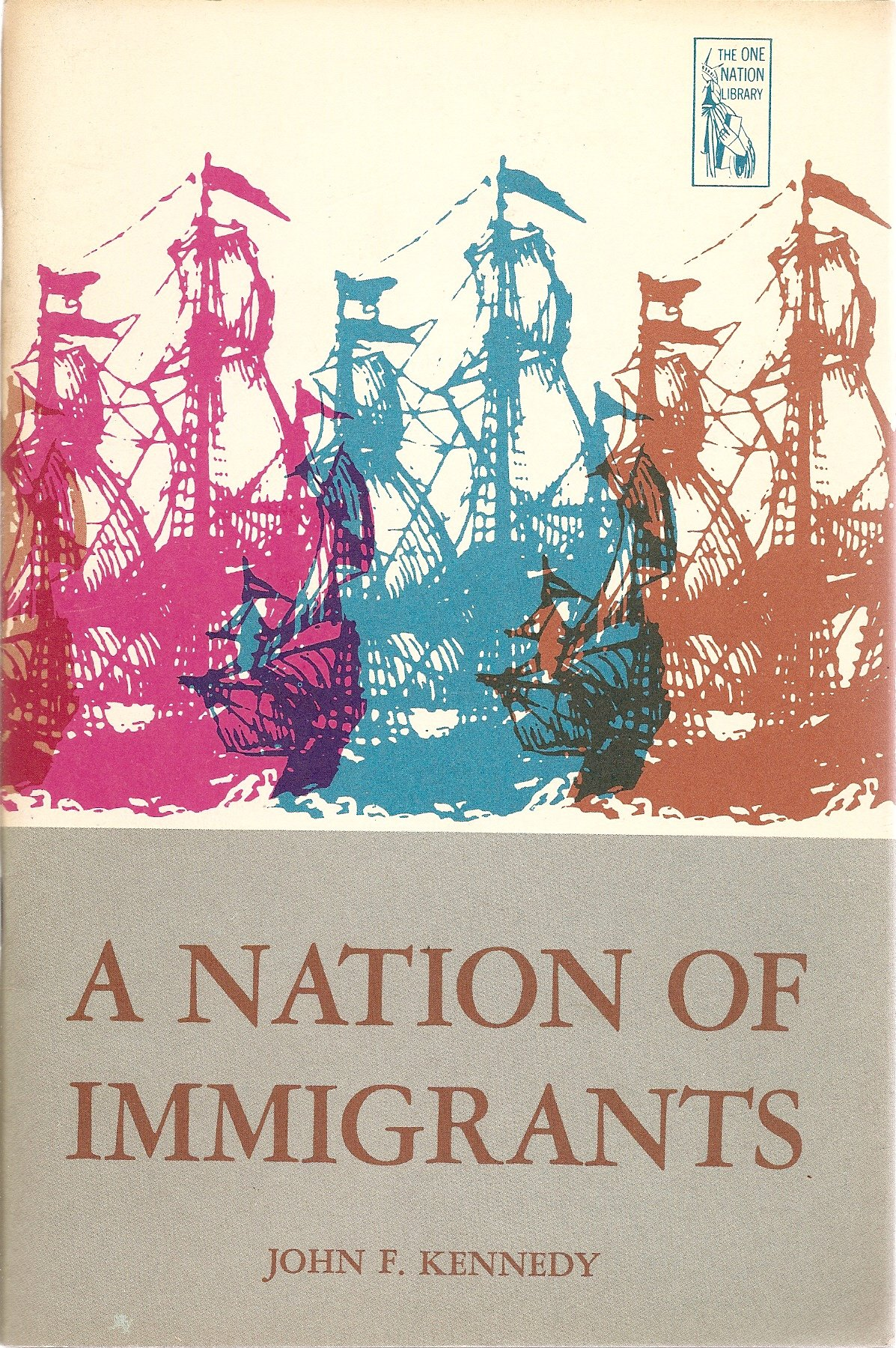
First edition front cover of A Nation of Immigrants by John F. Kennedy (1958)

John F. Kennedy, in his 1958 book A Nation of Immigrants, asserted that Philip Mazzei influenced the drafting of the US Declaration of Independence, stating that:

The great doctrine 'All men are created equal' incorporated into the Declaration of Independence by Thomas Jefferson, was paraphrased from the writing of Philip Mazzei, an Italian-born patriot and pamphleteer, who was a close friend of Jefferson. A few alleged scholars try to discredit Mazzei as the creator of this statement and idea, saying that 'there is no mention of it anywhere until after the Declaration was published.' This phrase appears in Italian in Mazzei's own hand, written in Italian, several years prior to the writing of the Declaration of Independence. Mazzei and Jefferson often exchanged ideas about true liberty and freedom. No one man can take complete credit for the ideals of American democracy.

== Legacy ==
A 40-cent United States airmail stamp was issued in 1980 to commemorate the 250th anniversary of Mazzei's birth.

In 1980, a park at Mace and Paulding Avenues near Williamsbridge Road in the Bronx, New York, was renamed "Mazzei Playground" in honor of Philip Mazzei.

In 1994, the US Congress designated October 1993 and October 1994 as "Italian-American Heritage and Culture Month". In the joint resolution's introductory "Whereas" clauses, Congress stated that the phrase "All men are created equal" in the Declaration of Independence was suggested by the Italian patriot and immigrant Philip Mazzei.

The World War II Liberty Ship SS Filipp Mazzei was named in his honor.

== See also ==
- American Revolution
- Patrick Henry
- George Mason, 1776 Virginia Declaration of Rights
- James Monroe
- William Paca
- Francesco Vigo
- John Page
- Founding Fathers of the United States
- List of important people in the era of the American Revolution

== Bibliography ==
=== In English ===
- Philip Mazzei: My Life and Wanderings, ed. Marchione, Sister Margherita, American Institute of Italian Studies, Morristown, NJ, 1980, 437pp ISBN 978-0916322038. Translation to English of Mazzei's autobiography.
- Marchione: Philip Mazzei: Selected Writings and Correspondence:

- Vol. I – Virginia's Agent during the American Revolution, XLVIII, 585 pp.;
- Vol. II – Agent for the King of Poland during the French Revolution, 802 pp.;
- Vol. III – World Citizen, 623 pp.
Cassa di Risparmi e Depositi, Prato, 1983, ISBN 978-0916322083.

- Marchione, Sister Margherita: Philip Mazzei: Jefferson's "Zealous Whig", American Institute of Italian Studies, Morristown, NJ, 1975, 352 pp. [ISBN unspecified]
- Marchione: The Adventurous Life of Philip Mazzei – La vita avventurosa di Filippo Mazzei (bilingual English – Italian), University Press of America, Lanham, MD, 1995, 235 pp. ISBN 978-0819199270
- Marchione: The Constitutional Society of 1784, Center for Mazzei Studies, Morristown, NJ, 1984, 49 pp. [ISBN unspecified]
- Marchione: Philip Mazzei: World Citizen (Jefferson's "Zealous Whig"), University Press of America, Lanham, MD, 1994, 158 pp. [ISBN unspecified]
- Renee Critcher Lyons: Foreign-Born American Patriots-Sixteen Volunteer Leaders In The Revolutionary War, 2014. North Carolina-McFarland Publishing. ISBN 978-0786471843

=== In Italian ===
- Filippo Mazzei: Scelta di scritti e lettere:

- Vol.I: 1765–1788. Agente di Virginia durante la rivoluzione americana; pp. XLVII–582
- Vol.II:1788–1791. Agente del Re di Polonia durante la Rivoluzione Francese; pp. XVI–703, XVII–633
- Vol.III: 1792–1816. Cittadino del Mondo; pp. XVII–633
Prato, 1984, Ediz.del Palazzo per Cassa di Risparmi e Depositi di Prato, [ISBN unspecified].

- Marchione, Sister Margherita: Istruzioni per essere liberi ed eguali, Cisalpino-Gogliardica, Milan, 1984, 160 pp [ISBN unspecified]
- Marchione: The Adventurous Life of Philip Mazzei - La vita avventurosa di Filippo Mazzei (bilingual English – Italian), University Press of America, Lanham, MD, 1995, 235 pp ISBN 978-0819199270

== Others books about Mazzei ==
=== In English ===
- Biaggi, Mario: An Appreciation of Philip Mazzei – an Unsung American Patriot, in CONGRESSIONAL RECORD, Washington, D.C., September 12, 1984 [ISBN unspecified]
- Di Grazia, Marco: Philip Mazzei, a hero of American independence. Illustrations and cover Marcello Mangiantini, translation Miranda MacPhail Tuscan Regional Government, Poggio a Caiano. 1990, 52p [ISBN unspecified]
- Gaines, William H.: Virginia History in Documents 1621-1788, Virginia State Library, Richmond, 1974 [ISBN unspecified]
- Garlick, Richard, Jr: Philip Mazzei, Friend of Jefferson: His Life and letters, Baltimore-London-Paris, The Johns Hopkins Press-Humphrey Nilfort Oxford University Press – Société d'Editions Les Belles Lettres, 1933 [ISBN unspecified]
- Garlick: Italy and the Italians in Washington's time, New York Arno Press, 1975 [ISBN unspecified]
- Guzzetta, Charles: Mazzei in America, in DREAM STREETS – THE BIG BOOK OF ITALIAN AMERICAN CULTURE, Lawrence DiStasi editor, Harper & Row, New York, 1989 [ISBN unspecified]
- Kennedy, John F.: A Nation of Immigrants, Perennial, 2008 ISBN 978-0061447549
- Lippucci, Mary Theresa: The correspondence between Thomas Jefferson and Philip Mazzei, 1779–1815, 1939 [ISBN unspecified]
- Malone, Dumas (editor): Dictionary of American Biography, VOL. VI, Charles Scribner's Sons, New York, 1933 [ISBN unspecified]
- Marraro, Howard R.: An Unpublished Jefferson Letter to Mazzei, Italica, Vol. 35, No. 2 (June 1958), pp. 83–87 [ISBN unspecified]
- Marraro: Jefferson Letters Concerning the Settlement of Mazzei's Virginia Estate, The Mississippi Valley Historical Review, Vol. 30, No. 2 (September 1943), pp. 235–242 [ISBN unspecified]
- Marraro: Philip Mazzei - Virginia's Agent in Europe, New York Public Library, 1935 [ISBN unspecified]
- Marraro: Philip Mazzei and his Polish friends sn, 1944 [ISBN unspecified]
- Sammartino, Peter: The Contributions of Italians to the United States before the Civil War: a conference to celebrate the 250th anniversary of the birth of Philip Mazzei, Washington, D.C., April 18–20, 1980, Washington, D.C., National Italian American Foundation, 1980. [ISBN unspecified]
- Schiavo, Giovanni Ermenegildo: Philip Mazzei: one of America's founding fathers, New York: Vigo Press, 1951 [ISBN unspecified]
- Masini, Giancarlo, Gori, Iacopo: How Florence Invented America - Vespucci, Verrazzano, Mazzei and their Contributions to the Conception of the New World, New York: Marsilio Publishers, 1999 ISBN 978-1568860602.

=== In Italian ===
- AA.VV., Dalla Toscana all'America: il contributo di Filippo Mazzei, Poggio a Caiano, Comune di Poggio a Caiano, 2004. [ISBN unspecified]
- Becattini Massimo, Filippo Mazzei mercante italiano a Londra (1756–1772), Poggio a Caiano, Comune di Poggio a Caiano, 1997. [ISBN unspecified]
- Bolognesi Andrea, Corsetti Luigi, Di Stadio Luigi: Filippo Mazzei mostra di cimeli e scritti, exhibition catalog edited by, Poggio a Caiano, Palazzo Comunale, July 3–25, 1996, Comune di Poggio a Caiano, 1996. [ISBN unspecified]
- Camajani Guelfo Guelfi,Filippo Mazzei : un illustre toscano del Settecento : medico, agricoltore, scrittore, giornalista, diplomatico, Firenze, Associazione Internazionale Toscani nel Mondo, 1976. [ISBN unspecified]
- Ciampini Raffaele, Lettere di Filippo Mazzei alla corte di Polonia (1788–1792), Bologna : N. Zanichelli, 1937 [ISBN unspecified]
- Corsetti Luigi, Gradi Renzo: Bibliografia su Filippo Mazzei Avventuriero della Libertà edited by, with writings by Margherita Marchione e Edoardo Tortarolo, Poggio a Caiano, C.I.C Filippo Mazzei – Associazione Culturale "Ardengo Soffici", 1993. [ISBN unspecified]
- Di Stadio Luigi, Filippo Mazzei tra pubblico e privato. Raccolta di documenti inediti, edited by, Poggio a Caiano, Biblioteca Comunale di Poggio a Caiano, 1996. [ISBN unspecified]
- Gerosa Guido, Il fiorentino che fece l'America. Vita e avventure di Filippo Mazzei 1730–1916, Milano, SugarCo Edizioni, 1990. ISBN 978-8871980034
- Gradi Renzo, Un bastimento carico di Roba bestie e uomini in un manoscritto inedito di Filippo Mazzei, Poggio a Caiano, Comune di Poggio a Caiano, 1991. [ISBN unspecified]
- Gradi Renzo, Parigi: luglio 1789. Scritti e memorie del fiorentino Filippo Mazzei, edited by Comune di Poggio a Caiano, 1989. [ISBN unspecified]
- Gullace Giovanni, Figure dimenticate dell'indipendenza americana, Filippo Mazzei e Francesco Vigo, Roma : Il Veltro, 1977. [ISBN unspecified]
- Masini Giancarlo, Gori Iacopo, L'America fu concepita a Firenze, Firenze : Bonechi, 1998. ISBN 978-8880292432
- Tognetti Burigana Sara, Tra riformismo illuminato e dispotismo napoleonico; esperienze del "cittadino americano" Filippo Mazzei, Roma, Edizioni di Storia e letteratura, 1965. [ISBN unspecified]
- Tortarolo Edoardo, Illuminismo e Rivoluzioni. Biografia politica di Filippo Mazzei, Milano, Angeli, 1986. ISBN 978-8820440961
- Łukaszewicz, Witold, Filippo Mazzei, Giuseppe Mazzini; saggi sui rapporti italo-polacchi, Wroclaw, Poland Zakład Narodowy im. Ossolińskich, 1970. [ISBN unspecified]
