= SS Dwight W. Morrow =

American Liberty ship of WWII

History

United States
- Name: Dwight W. Morrow
- Namesake: Dwight W. Morrow
- Owner: War Shipping Administration (WSA)
- Operator: Sprague Steamship Co.
- Ordered: as type (EC2-S-C1) hull, MC hull 1206
- Builder: St. Johns River Shipbuilding Company, Jacksonville, Florida
- Cost: $1,766,458
- Yard number: 14
- Way number: 2
- Laid down: 5 July 1943
- Launched: 21 September 1943
- Sponsored by: Elizabeth Cutter Morrow
- Completed: 5 October 1943
- Identification: Call sign: KTNV
- Fate: Laid up in the, National Defense Reserve Fleet, Mobile, Alabama, 13 October 1945; Laid up in the, National Defense Reserve Fleet, Wilmington, North Carolina, 28 August 1948; Sold for scrapping, 4 April 1968, removed from fleet, 16 May 1968

General characteristics
- Class & type: Liberty ship; type EC2-S-C1, standard
- Tonnage: 10,865 LT DWT; 7,176 GRT
- Displacement: 3,380 long tons (3,434 t) (light); 14,245 long tons (14,474 t) (max)
- Length: 441 feet 6 inches (135 m) oa; 416 feet (127 m) pp; 427 feet (130 m) lwl
- Beam: 57 feet (17 m)
- Draft: 27 ft 9.25 in (8.4646 m)
- Installed power: 2 × Oil fired 450 °F (232 °C) boilers, operating at 220 psi (1,500 kPa); 2,500 hp (1,900 kW)
- Propulsion: 1 × triple-expansion steam engine, (manufactured by General Machinery Corp., Hamilton, Ohio); 1 × screw propeller
- Speed: 11.5 knots (21.3 km/h; 13.2 mph)
- Capacity: 562,608 cubic feet (15,931 m^{3}) (grain); 499,573 cubic feet (14,146 m^{3}) (bale)
- Complement: 38–62 USMM; 21–40 USNAG
- Armament: Varied by ship; Bow-mounted 3-inch (76 mm)/50-caliber gun; Stern-mounted 4-inch (102 mm)/50-caliber gun; 2–8 × single 20-millimeter (0.79 in) Oerlikon anti-aircraft (AA) cannons and/or, 2–8 × 37-millimeter (1.46 in) M1 AA guns

SS Dwight W. Morrow was a Liberty ship built in the United States during World War II. She was named after Dwight W. Morrow, an American businessman, diplomat, and politician. Morrow was a partner in J.P. Morgan & Co., served as United States Ambassador to Mexico from 1927 to 1930, and was a US Senator from New Jersey from 1930 to 1931.

== Construction ==
Dwight W. Morrow was laid down on 5 July 1943, under a Maritime Commission (MARCOM) contract, MC hull 1206, by the St. Johns River Shipbuilding Company, Jacksonville, Florida; she was sponsored by Elizabeth Cutter Morrow, the widow of the namesake, she was launched on 21 September 1943.

== History ==
She was allocated to Sprague Steamship Co., on 5 October 1943. On 13 October 1945, she was laid up in the National Defense Reserve Fleet, Mobile, Alabama, with an estimated $37,500 in damage. She was laid up in the, National Defense Reserve Fleet, Atlantic Reserve Fleet, Wilmington, North Carolina, 28 August 1948. She was sold for scrapping, on 4 April 1968, to Union Minerals and Alloys Corporation. She was listed as removed from the fleet on 16 May 1968. A telegram dated 27 February 1970, declares that she wasn't removed until this date, and sold to Horton Industries, Inc. The telegram goes on to say that with the removal of Dwight W. Morrow, the last ship remaining at Wilmington, the service of the Atlantic Reserve Fleet, Wilmington was complete after twenty-three and a half years.

== Bibliography ==
- "St. John's River Shipbuilding, Jacksonville FL". www.ShipbuildingHistory.com. 16 October 2010.
- Maritime Administration. "Dwight W. Morrow". Ship History Database Vessel Status Card. U.S. Department of Transportation, Maritime Administration.
- Davies, James (May 2004). "Specifications (As-Built)" (PDF). p. 23.
- "SS Dwight W. Morrow".
