= All men are created equal =

Phrase from United States Declaration of Independence

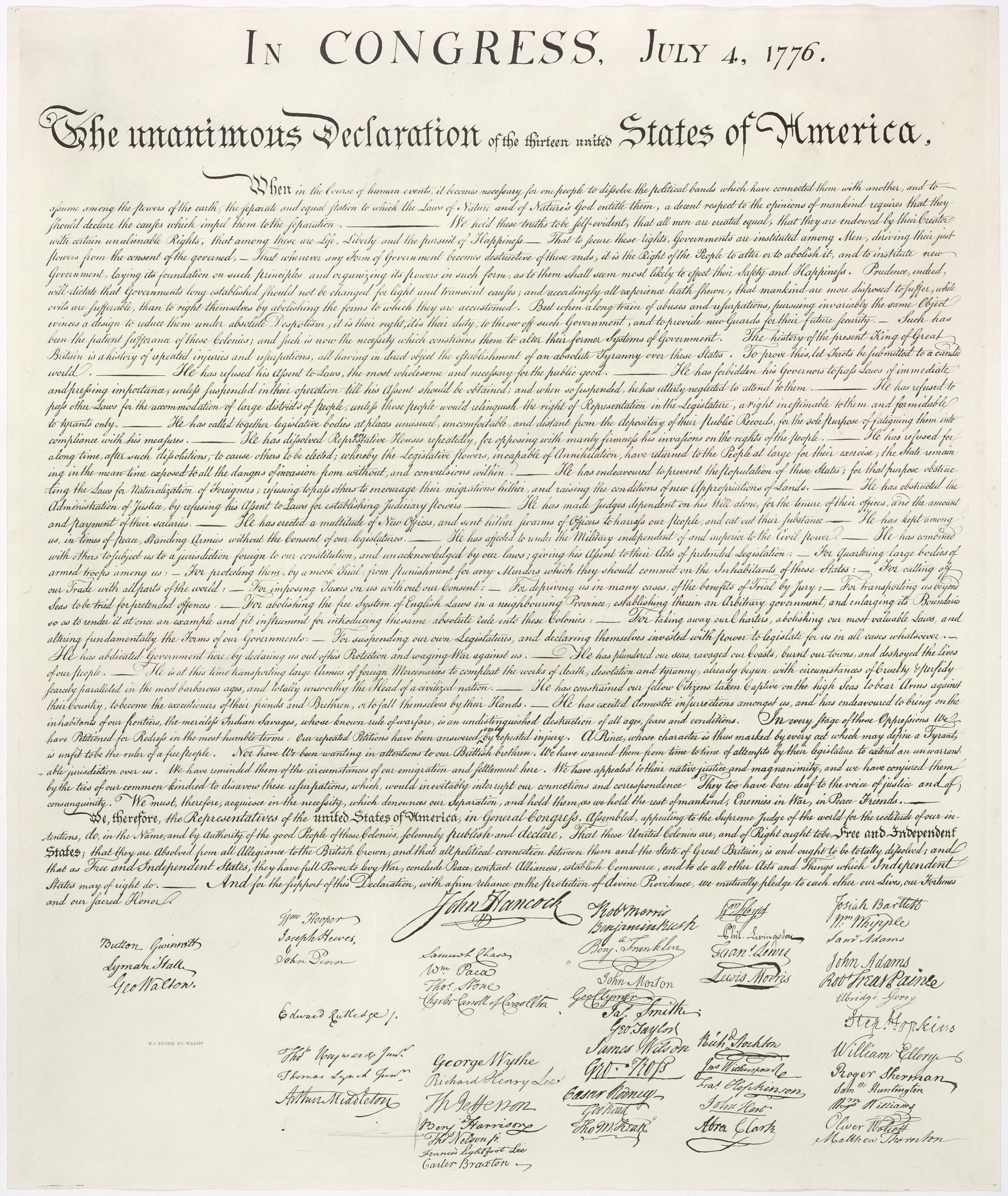
The U.S. Declaration of Independence

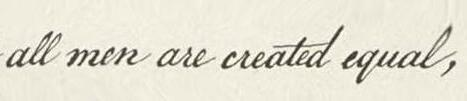
The phrase in the document

The quotation "all men are created equal...Life liberty and the pursuit of happiness" is found in the United States Declaration of Independence and is a phrase that has come to be seen as emblematic of America's founding ideals. The final form of the sentence was stylized by Benjamin Franklin, and penned by Thomas Jefferson during the beginning of the Revolutionary War in 1776. It reads:

"We hold these truths to be self-evident, that all men are created equal, that they are endowed by their Creator with certain unalienable Rights, that among these are Life, Liberty and the pursuit of Happiness."

Drawing from Enlightenment philosophy, the phrase reflects the influence of John Locke's second treatise on government, particularly his belief in inherent equality and individual liberty. Similar ideas can be traced back to earlier works, including medieval and classical sources, which emphasized the dignity and worth of all human beings. Jefferson applied the concept in his original draft of the declaration. The phrase was subsequently quoted and incorporated into the speeches and writings of prominent figures throughout American political and social history. It has been called an "immortal declaration", and "perhaps [the] single phrase" of the American Revolutionary period with the greatest "continuing importance."

== Origins ==
The phrase is attested as early as pope Gregory the Great in book XXI of his Moralia in Job (c. 578 – c. 595). and was picked up by Thomas Aquinas, Azo, Hervaeus Natalis, and other medieval thinkers.

Thomas Jefferson, a key figure in drafting the Declaration of Independence, was heavily influenced by French Enlightenment philosophers such as Voltaire, Rousseau and Montesquieu, largely through his friendship with the Marquis de Lafayette. These philosophers, whose writings were often censored, advocated that men were born free and equal. Their ideas profoundly impacted the French Revolution of 1789 and the development of the concept of human rights (droits de l'homme). At the age of 33, Jefferson may also have drawn inspiration from his Italian friend and neighbor Filippo Mazzei, as claimed by John F. Kennedy in A Nation of Immigrants and by Joint Resolution 175 of the 103rd Congress. Additionally, Jefferson might have been influenced by Thomas Paine's Common Sense, which was published in early 1776.

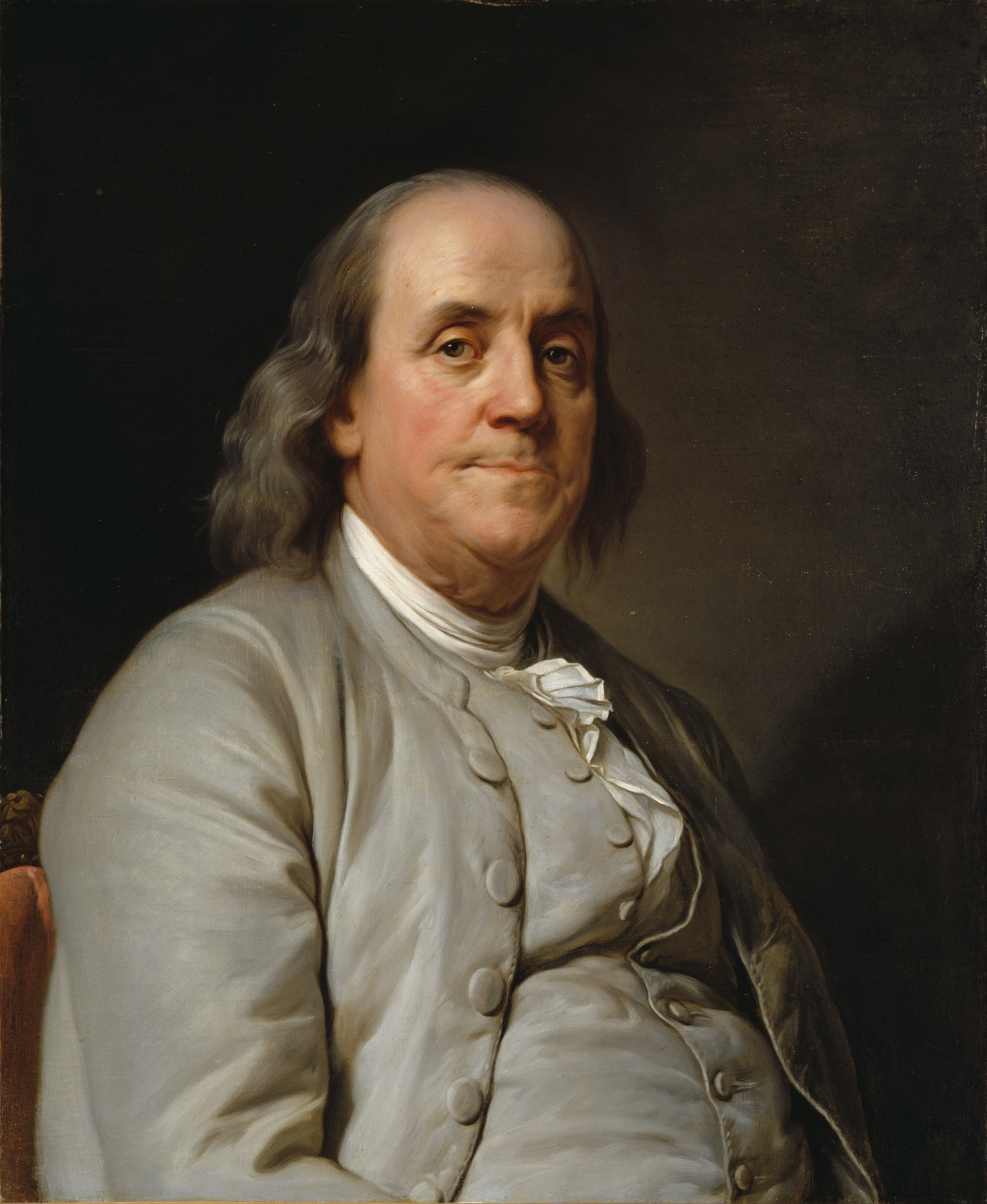
Benjamin Franklin by Joseph Duplessis, 1778. He is credited with stylizing the final form of the quote.

In English history there exist earlier uses of nearly the same phrase. First by the medieval priest John Ball who at the outbreak of the 1381 Peasants Revolt in his famous sermon posited the question "When Adam delved and Eve span, Who was then the gentleman?" and proclaimed "From the beginning all men by nature were created alike". In his 1690 work Second Treatise of Government the philosopher John Locke argues that in the "state of nature" that existed before the formation of governments all men were created equal. Another example is in John Milton's 1649 book called The Tenure of Kings and Magistrates, written after the First English Civil War to defend the actions and rights of the Parliamentary cause, in the wake of the execution of king Charles I. The English poet says: "No man who knows ought, can be so stupid to deny that all men naturally were borne free, being the image and resemblance of God himself ... born to command and not to obey: and that they liv'd so".

In 1776, the Second Continental Congress asked Benjamin Franklin, Thomas Jefferson, John Adams, Robert Livingston, and Roger Sherman to write the Declaration of Independence. This Committee of Five voted to have Thomas Jefferson write the document. After Jefferson finished he gave the document to Franklin to proof. Franklin suggested minor changes, one of which stands out far more than the others: "We hold these truths to be sacred and un-deniable..." became "We hold these truths to be self-evident."

The second paragraph of the United States Declaration of Independence starts: "We hold these truths to be self-evident, that all men are created equal, that they are endowed by their Creator with certain unalienable Rights, that among these are Life, Liberty and the Pursuit of Happiness.-- That to secure these rights, Governments are instituted among Men, deriving their just powers from the consent of the governed."

The Virginia Declaration of Rights, chiefly authored by George Mason and approved by the Virginia Convention on June 12, 1776, contains the wording: "all men are by nature equally free and independent, and have certain inherent rights of which . . . they cannot deprive or divest their posterity; namely, the enjoyment of life and liberty, with the means of acquiring and possessing property, and pursuing and obtaining happiness and safety." George Mason was an elder-planter who had originally stated John Locke's theory of natural rights: "All men are born equally free and independent and have certain inherent natural rights of which they cannot, by any compact, deprive or divest their posterity; among which are the enjoyment of life and liberty, with the means of acquiring and possessing property, and pursuing and obtaining happiness and safety." Mason's draft was accepted by a small committee and then rejected by the Virginia Convention. Thomas Jefferson, a competent Virginia lawyer, saw this as a problem in legal writing and chose words that were more acceptable to the Second Continental Congress.

The Massachusetts Constitution, chiefly authored by John Adams in 1780, contains in its Declaration of Rights the wording: "All men are born free and equal, and have certain natural, essential, and unalienable rights; among which may be reckoned the right of enjoying and defending their lives and liberties; that of acquiring, possessing, and protecting property; in fine, that of seeking and obtaining their safety and happiness."

The plaintiffs in the cases of Brom and Bett v. John Ashley and Commonwealth v. Nathaniel Jennison argued that this provision abolished slavery in Massachusetts. The latter case resulted in a "sweeping declaration . . . that the institution of slavery was incompatible with the principles of liberty and legal equality articulated in the new Massachusetts Constitution".

The phrase has since been considered a hallmark statement in democratic constitutions and similar human rights instruments, many of which have adopted the phrase or variants thereof. (Note: UN Universal Declaration of Human Rights, Preamble: Whereas recognition of the inherent dignity, and of the equal and inalienable rights of all members of the human family is the foundation of freedom, justice and peace in the world & Article 1: All human beings are born free and equal in dignity and rights. They are endowed with reason and conscience and should act towards one another in a spirit of brotherhood.)

== Criticism ==
=== Early ===
In the August 1776 issue of The Scots Magazine criticized the quotation, saying "In what are they created equal? Is it in size, strength, understanding, figure, moral or civil accomplishments, or situation of life? Every ploughman knows that they are not created equal in any of these."

In the early 19th century, the phrase attracted criticism from proslavery politicians. Virginia Senator John Randolph of Roanoke criticized the phrase, stating that it was "a falsehood, and a most pernicious falsehood, even though I find it in the Declaration of Independence". John C. Calhoun concurred with this view, saying that there was "not a word of truth" in the phrase. In 1853, speaking in regard to the Kansas–Nebraska Act, Indiana Senator John Pettit said that the phrase was not a "self-evident truth" but a "self-evident lie".

Confederate Vice President Alexander H. Stephens also criticized the sentence in 1861 in his Cornerstone Speech, calling it a "false idea" and noting that the Confederate States of America was founded "upon exactly the opposite idea; its foundations are laid, its corner-stone rests, upon the great truth that the negro is not equal to the white man; that slavery subordination to the superior race is his natural and normal condition." Benjamin Tillman, a South Carolina Democrat who served as the state's governor from 1890 to 1894 and as a Senator from 1895 to 1918, once stated that "We deny, without regard to color, that 'all men are created equal'; it is not true now, and was not true when Jefferson wrote it."

=== Contemporary ===
Howard Zinn and others have written that the phrase is sexist. Zinn says that the use of the word men, to the exclusion of women, indicated the women were "beyond consideration as worthy of inclusion" and "they were simply overlooked in any consideration of political rights, any notions of civic equality". However, others argue that in the 1700s, the word men was sometimes used to denote both genders. According to the Library of Congress, most people have interpreted "all men" to mean humanity and, within the context of the times, it is clear that "all men" meant "humanity".

It has also been criticized on grounds of racism. Nikole Hannah-Jones wrote in The New York Times that "the white men who drafted those words did not believe them to be true for the hundreds of thousands of black people in their midst." Historian Nicholas Guyatt has criticized the "long exile of blacks and Indians from 'all men are created equal'" and historian John Hope Franklin also states that "Jefferson didn't mean it when he wrote that all men are created equal. We've never meant it. The truth is we're a bigoted people and always have been".

Richard M. Weaver, in one of the cornerstone works of traditional conservatism, Ideas Have Consequences (1948), paraphrased a 19th-century writer, stating that "no man was ever created free and no two men [were] ever created equal". He continued: "The comity of peoples in groups large or small rests not upon this chimerical notion of equality but upon fraternity, a concept which long antedates it in history because it goes immeasurably deeper in human sentiment. The ancient feeling of brotherhood carries obligations of which equality knows nothing. It calls for respect and protection, for brotherhood is status in family, and family is by nature hierarchical."

=== Slavery ===
The contradiction between the claim that "all men are created equal" and the existence of American slavery, including Jefferson himself owning hundreds of slaves, attracted comment when the Declaration of Independence was first published. Before final approval, Congress, having made a few alterations to some of the wording, also deleted nearly a fourth of the draft, including a passage criticizing the slave trade. At that time many other members of Congress also owned slaves, which clearly factored into their decision to delete the controversial "anti-slavery" passage. In 1776, abolitionist Thomas Day wrote: "If there be an object truly ridiculous in nature, it is an American patriot, signing resolutions of independency with the one hand, and with the other brandishing a whip over his affrighted slaves." In January 1788, Charles Cotesworth Pinckney delivered a speech to the South Carolina House of Representatives in which he argued against adopting a planned bill of rights: "Bills of rights generally begin with declaring that all men are by nature born free. Now, we should make that declaration with a very bad grace, when a large part of our property consists in men who are actually born slaves."

=== Indigenous people ===
Jefferson also dehumanized the Natives as "merciless Indian savages" in the Declaration. In response, Simon Moya-Smith, culture editor at Indian Country Today, wrote, "Any holiday that would refer to my people in such a repugnant, racist manner is certainly not worth celebrating. [July Fourth] is a day when we celebrate our resiliency, our culture, our languages, our children and we mourn the millions – literally millions – of indigenous people who have died as a consequence of American imperialism."

=== Black people ===
Jefferson explicitly addressed Black people in his Notes on the State of Virginia in 1785, writing "Blacks are inferior to the whites in the endowments of body and mind", and on being mixed with white people, "The improvement of the blacks in body and mind, in the first instance of their mixture with the whites, has been observed by every one, and proves that their inferiority is not the effect merely of their condition of life".

=== Responses to criticism ===
==== Early ====
Senator Benjamin Wade defended the phrase in 1854, stating that all men are created equal in the sense that they are "equal in point of right" so "no man has a right to trample upon another". According to Abraham Lincoln, the founders did not mean that "all were equal in color, size, intellect, moral developments, or social capacity" but rather that everyone was equal in having "certain inalienable rights, among which are life, liberty and the pursuit of happiness".

==== Contemporary ====
Also in defense of the phrase, Stanford University historian Jack Rakove said that the founders were not referring to the equality of individuals but to the right to self-government enjoyed by all peoples. It was only later, in the decades following the Revolution, said Rakove, that the statement came to be interpreted in reference to personal liberties.

== Legacy ==
The Proclamation of Independence of the Democratic Republic of Vietnam, written in 1945, uses the phrase "all men are created equal" and also mentions the United States Declaration of Independence in it.

The Rhodesia's Unilateral Declaration of Independence, ratified in November 1965, is based on the American one, however, it omits the phrase "all men are created equal", along with "the consent of the governed".

The sentiment of the phrase, although not the exact wording, is echoed in numerous subsequent declarations of rights, including the Universal Declaration of Human Rights, the Canadian Charter of Rights and Freedoms, Germany's Basic Laws, the Constitution of Algeria, and many other constitutions.

The phrase often serves as the first, or one of the first, rights listed in enumerations of rights, as a framing for all subsequent rights. Since Declarations of rights are often applied to all people, as natural human rights, the phrase emphasizes that all rights listed after it apply equally to every person.

== See also ==
- Equality before the law
- French Declaration of the Rights of Man and of the Citizen (1789), article 1: "Men are born and remain free and equal in rights. Social distinctions may be founded only upon the general good."
- Political equality
- Second-class citizen
- Universal Declaration of Human Rights (1948), article 1: "All human beings are born free and equal in dignity and rights..."
- "The Schuyler Sisters", a song from Hamilton referencing the line

== Bibliography ==
- Armitage, David (2007). The Declaration of Independence: A Global History. Cambridge, MA: Harvard University Press. ISBN 978-0-674-02282-9.
- Bearn, Gordon C.F. Life Drawing: A Deleuzean Aesthetics of Existence. Fordham University Press.
- Gowlland-Debbas, Vera (1990). Collective Responses to Illegal Acts in International Law: United Nations action in the question of Southern Rhodesia (First ed.). Leiden and New York: Martinus Nijhoff Publishers. ISBN 0-7923-0811-5.
- Oberle, Lora Polack (2002). The Declaration of Independence. Capstone Publishers. ISBN 978-0-7368-1095-1.
- Palley, Claire (1966). The Constitutional History and Law of Southern Rhodesia 1888–1965, with Special Reference to Imperial Control (First ed.). Oxford: Clarendon Press. OCLC 406157.
- Tierney, Brian (1982). Religion, Law, and the Growth of Constitutional Thought, 1150-1650. Cambridge University Press.
- Zinn, Howard (2015). A People's History of the United States. Harper Collins. ISBN 9780062466679.
- Bearn, Gordon C.F. Life Drawing: A Deleuzean Aesthetics of Existence. Fordham University Press.
