= Dwight Morrow Jr. =

American educator and cofounder of the Monterey Institute (1908–1976)

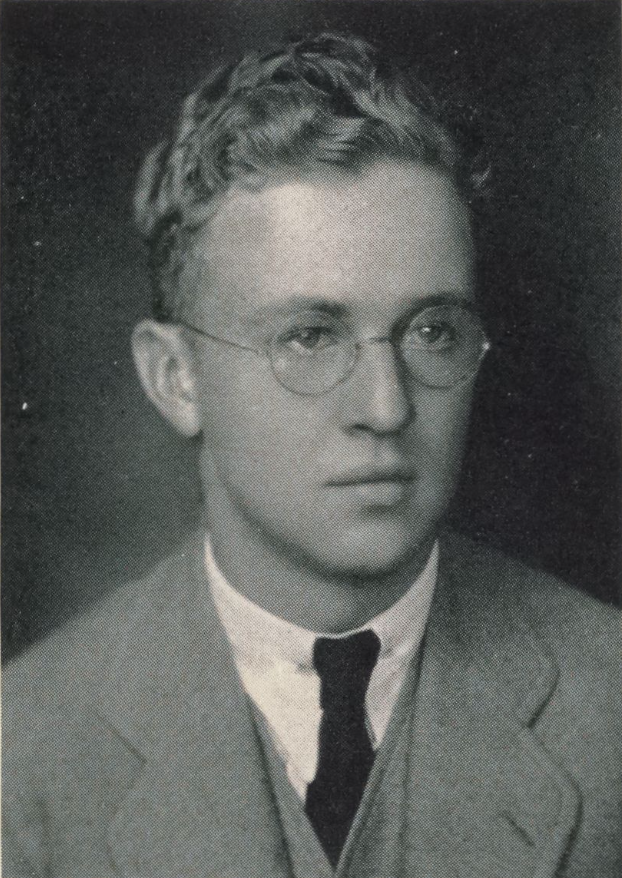
- Amherst Olio photo, 1932
- Born: Dwight Whitney Morrow Jr. November 28, 1908; Englewood, New Jersey
- Died: September 4, 1976 (Aged 67); Monterey, California
- Resting place: Ashes spread along Rocky Creek, Monterey County, CA
- Education: Groton School
- Alma mater: Amherst College; Harvard University; Yale Law School
- Spouse(s): Margot Loines Wilkie (m. 1937 – 1946 or 1948); Nancy Schallert Lofton Morrow (m. 1970)
- Relatives: Dwight Morrow (father); Elizabeth Cutter Morrow (mother); Anne Morrow Lindbergh (sister); Charles Lindbergh (brother in law)

Dwight Whitney Morrow Jr., November 28, 1908 – September 4, 1976 was a cofounder and served on the board of directors for the Monterey Institute of Foreign Studies (MIFS), where he was also a professor and researcher in the field of economics.

== Early life and education ==
He was the only son of Dwight Morrow, the former US Ambassador to Mexico and Senator from the state of New Jersey. In 1928, at the age of 20, Morrow suffered from his first episode of mental illness, and had to withdraw from school. Morrow's parents were wealthy enough to send him to a private institution in Newfoundland, where he was diagnosed with paranoid schizophrenia. Morrow, however, recovered from his episodes and went on to thrive in the field of pedagogy.

As a senior at Amherst College, where he was a member of Beta Theta Pi, he was voted "most likely to succeed." After graduating from Amherst, he worked as an instructor and an assistant to the President of Amherst College at the time, Stanley King. In 1933, he was enrolled in Harvard University.

== Lindbergh kidnapping ==
Morrow's sister was Anne Morrow Lindbergh, and his brother-in-law was Charles Lindbergh. In the book A Talent to Deceive: Who Really Killed the Lindberg Baby, the author William Norris heavily suggests that Morrow is directly responsible for the kidnapping of the Lindbergh baby. However, Morrow was never questioned by police, and was seen at least 200 miles away from the Lindbergh house at the time.

On March 1, 1936, Morrow's dorm room on the Harvard campus was broken into. The rooms were located at 220 Prescott Street, in Cambridge, Massachusetts. He shared his rooms with another student, Richard MacMeekin. However, the only thing stolen in this burglary were letters sent from his mother, Elizabeth Cutter Morrow, and his sister, Anne Morrow Lindbergh. Morrow immediately informed Norman Schwarzkopf and Henry Skillman Breckinridge of the burglary. Schwarzkopf then immediately informed Paul G. Kirk Sr., who was in charge of The Staties at the time. A newspaper in Boston suggested later that evening that the burglary might have contained evidence regarding the case of the Lindbergh baby, and the trial for the conviction of Richard Hauptmann. In 1936, Morrow had to flee from the Harvard campus to avoid questions from reporters and police about the letters.

Shortly afterward, in 1936, he enrolled at Yale Law School.

== Marriage and move to California ==
In 1937, Morrow married Margaret Loines at her family's farm, Seven Gates Farm in Martha's Vineyard. They lived for some time in New York City, where they had their first off three children.

In 1939, Morrow and his wife both joined the Harvard Columbus Expedition, which was organized by Harvard to retrace the historical sailing routes of Christopher Columbus.

Primarily for reasons due to his health, Morrow moved to Carmel Valley in 1941, where the family bought a 140-acre dairy farm. Morrow oversaw one heard of Jersey cattle and another heard of Guernsey cattle on the farm. Morrow actually managed two farms: the Marble Ranch in Monterey, and the farm in Carmel Valley, which was called at that time the Carmel Valley Dairy Farm. The Lindbergh family would often visit the farm for vacations when traveling to California. Morrow and Loines divorced in 1946 or 1948, and she moved back to the East Coast, while Morrow stayed in California, having become involved in the local education and golfing communities.

In 1951, he convinced his friend Gaspard Weiss to move to Monterey. In 1955, Weiss convinced Morrow to become a cofounder of the Monterey Institute of Foreign Studies (MIFS), and Morrow served on the board of the institute for several years.

Beginning in 1952, Morrow delegated the management of his dairy to a business partner while spending much of his time on the East Coast. He took up a teaching position in international relations at Lincoln University in Pennsylvania. Following the death of his mother in 1955, managed her estate. In 1956, he completed his doctorate at Harvard University. For the remainder of his life, until his death in 1976, he divided his residence between Carmel Valley and Pennsylvania.

In 1960, recalling a prior discussion with Ed Haber, who worked with Robert Muir Graves to turn it into the Carmel Valley Golf and Country Club, which officially opened in the summer of 1964. Today the golf course is known as the Quail Lodge and Golf Club.

In 1970, he remarried to Nancy Lofton. He died 6 years later.
