= USNS Lynn =

Ship built in 1945

History

United States
- Name: Lynn Victory MCV-847
- Builder: Bethlehem-Fairfield Shipyards, Inc., Baltimore, Maryland
- Laid down: 25 June 1945
- Launched: 15 August 1945
- Acquired: 20 September 1945
- Stricken: Sold, 1967
- Identification: IMO number: 5215351
- Fate: Scrapped, 1970

General characteristics
- Class & type: Victory ship
- Length: 455 ft (138.7 m)
- Beam: 62 ft (18.9 m)

Lynn Victory MCV-847 was one of 12 ships scheduled to be acquired by the Navy in February 1966 and converted into Forward Depot Ships, the forerunners of the Fast Deployment Logistics Ships (FDL). She was scheduled to be renamed Lynn and placed in service with the Military Sea Transport Service as USNS Lynn T-AG-182. The program, however, was canceled and the ships were not acquired by the Navy. Five companies competed for the Contract Definition Phase of the FDL program: Lockheed Shipbuilding and Construction Co., General Dynamics Corporation, Litton Industries Inc., Todd Shipyards Corporation, Bethlehem Steel Corporation.

Lynn Victory was a Victory ship built by Bethlehem-Fairfield Shipyards, Inc. in Baltimore, Maryland in 1945.

== See also ==
- List of Victory ships
- List of auxiliaries of the United States Navy
- Sprague Steamship Company
