= Sprague Energy =

US Energy company

Sprague Resources (Sprague Energy) (Charles H. Sprague Company) (C. H. Sprague and Son)
- Company type: Shareholder
- Industry: Energy
- Founded: 1870 in Boston
- Founder: Charles H. Sprague
- Headquarters: Portsmouth, New Hampshire, United States
- Products: natural gas, Fuel Oil, Gasoline, Kerosene, Diesel, Bio Fuel, Aviation Fuel
- Owner: Hartree Partners
- Website: spragueenergy.com

Sprague Energy, formerly Charles H. Sprague Company, C. H. Sprague and Son, is a Northeastern United States energy supplier. Charles H. Sprague Company was founded in 1870 in Boston by Charles H. Sprague. Charles H. Sprague Company delivered coal to New England cities from Newport News, Virginia. In 1905 Sprague expanded and opened the Penobscot Coal and Wharf Company in Searsport, Maine. This became the main supplier of US coal to Europe, particularly during World War II.

Post World War II Sprague added residual fuel oil products. In 1959 Sprague opened a refinery. In the 1960s Sprague sold coal operations to Westmoreland Coal Company. In 1970 the Sprague family sold the company to Royal Dutch Shell's Asiatic Petroleum Company, who sold it two years later to the Axel Johnson Group of Stockholm, Sweden.

Sprague entered in a partnership with Westmoreland Coal Company in 1982. Starting in 1990s and today Sprague Energy is active in natural gas delivery system in Northeastern. Sprague moved its headquarters from Boston to Portsmouth, New Hampshire. In 2005 Sprague purchased the Merrill Marine Terminal Services in Portland, Maine. In 2007 Sprague Kildair Service Ltd, Montreal export cargo company. In 2013 Sprague went public as Sprague Resources LP (SRLP). In 2017, Sprague purchased Coen Energy, an Energy company in Pennsylvania, Ohio and West Virginia.

In May 2021 Axel Johnson sold their controlling stake in Sprague for a total of $290m to Hartree Partners, LP, a privately held energy and commodities firm founded in 1997. In June 2022 Hartree bought out the remaining shareholders at $19/share.

== Sprague Steamship Company ==
Sprague Steamship Company was founded by Charles H. Sprague Company as the Boston shipping company to support World War I. During World War II Sprague Steamship Company operated coal ships to supply coal to United States Armed Forces and the allied nations of the United States. Sprague Steamship Company ship crossed the Atlantic Ocean during the Battle of the Atlantic with a fleet of 27 ships. The Sprague Steamship Company operated out of eleven US terminals. In 1942 Sprague was selected to manage the World War II coal shipment program. Sprague Steamship Company also chartered ships from the Maritime Commission and War Shipping Administration to meet the demand. In 1913 Sprague purchased schooners from the bankrupt C. S. Glidden & Company. During World War I, Sprague Steamship Company was a major supplier of coal to America's European allies. Post World War I Sprague Steamship Company continued service to South America.

== Sprague Steamship Company ships ==
- SS Celestial
- SS Wideawake
- SS Black Point sank May 5, 1945 by U-853 off Point Judith, Rhode Island, the last U-boat victim of the War.

== World War II ships ==
Liberty ship of World War II

Liberty ships and Victory ships operated by Sprague Steamship Company:

- SS Augustine Heard
- SS Lynn Victory
- SS Daniel Webster
- SS Bon Air Seam
- SS Benjamin Schlesinger
- SS Charles W. Eliot
- SS John Trumbull
- SS Filipp Mazzei
- SS Dwight W. Morrow

== See also ==
- World War II United States Merchant Navy
- American Export Lines
