= Vertumnus and Pomona (Pontormo) =

Fresco painting by Pontormo

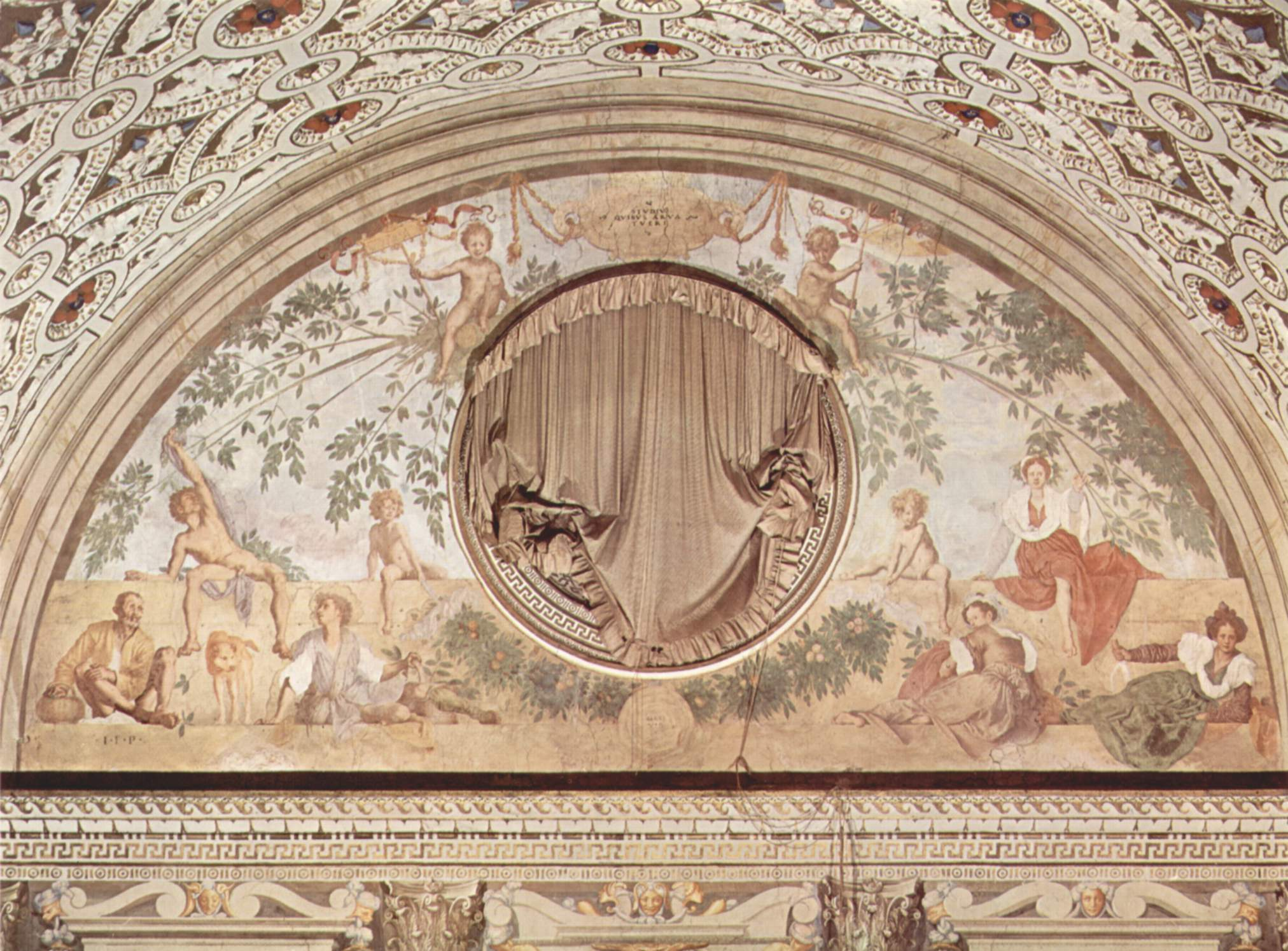
Jacopo Pontormo, Vertumnus and Pomona, 1520–21

Vertumnus and Pomona is a fresco decoration in the Medici country villa at Poggio a Caiano (near Montalbano), executed c. 1519–1521 by Jacopo Pontormo. The villa is set among orchards and gardens, and in summer, served as a retreat from the heat in Florence.

The fresco is contained within a lunette high in a barrel-vaulted central hall. The allegorical figures over the doors and the facing fresco depicting Julius Caesar, begun by Pontormo’s mentor, Andrea del Sarto, were completed decades later by Alessandro Allori. Pontormo initially received the commission from Ottaviano de' Medici and Cardinal Giulio de' Medici, the future Clement VII, and Giovanni de’ Medici (later pope as Leo X).

The painting depicts peasants, including a naked youth, picking fruit or lounging beneath trees in a walled framework. Putti garland the window. The stated theme is the classical myth of Vertumnus and Pomona taken from a story in Ovid's Metamorphoses. The myth is that of Pomona, a beautiful but aloof wood-nymph, shown with a sickle at right lower corner, who sheltered herself inside her orchard, dedicating herself to its cultivation while spurning all suitors. Vertumnus, either a demigod of seasons or a satyr, becomes taken with the nymph's beauty, but she ignores and rebuffs all his advances to enter her realm and remains a maiden. The mutable Vertumnus gains access to the orchard disguised or transformed into an old woman (depicted as an old man with a basket, however, in this fresco). Once inside, the myth relates that the disguised Vertumnus convinces Pomona, by means of allusive stories, to "carpe diem" and choose the handsome youth Vertumnus, who finally reveals his true form.

One interpretation of this fresco is that the allegory delicately counterposes the turns in the myth using a mirror fashion in each hemi-lunette by depicting a contrast of the elder-faced Vertumnus with the rapt Pomona, the youth with a basket and a turning maiden, and finally, the naked man aloft on the fence picking fruit from the same tree from which, at a distance, the maiden trims a branch while clothed in a red dress that suggests arousal. This is an elaborately seductive interpretation for this fresco that was created for a family closely associated with the papacy.

The imagery is an apt choice for this rural farm, however. It lacks the usual melancholy of Pontormo's religious canvases, and thus, is unique among his works. In some ways, this painting is aberrant in the prevailing current of Florentine painting of its time. Florentine painting, if not portraiture, often was intellectual, academic, and focused on allegory, mythology, or religious themes. Genre topics and still life studies were rare for the high-minded Florentines. In addition, nearly all Italian painting until that time depicted indoor settings or included urban landscapes, and if not, the landscape was unmemorable sfumato dissipating in the distance.

The summer season evoked by the fruit and the reposing figures in the fresco is powerful as well as soothing. The theme of the relaxed near-genre scene gently suggests fertility.
