= Poggio a Caiano =

Municipality in Tuscany, Italy

- Comune
- Comune di Poggio a Caiano
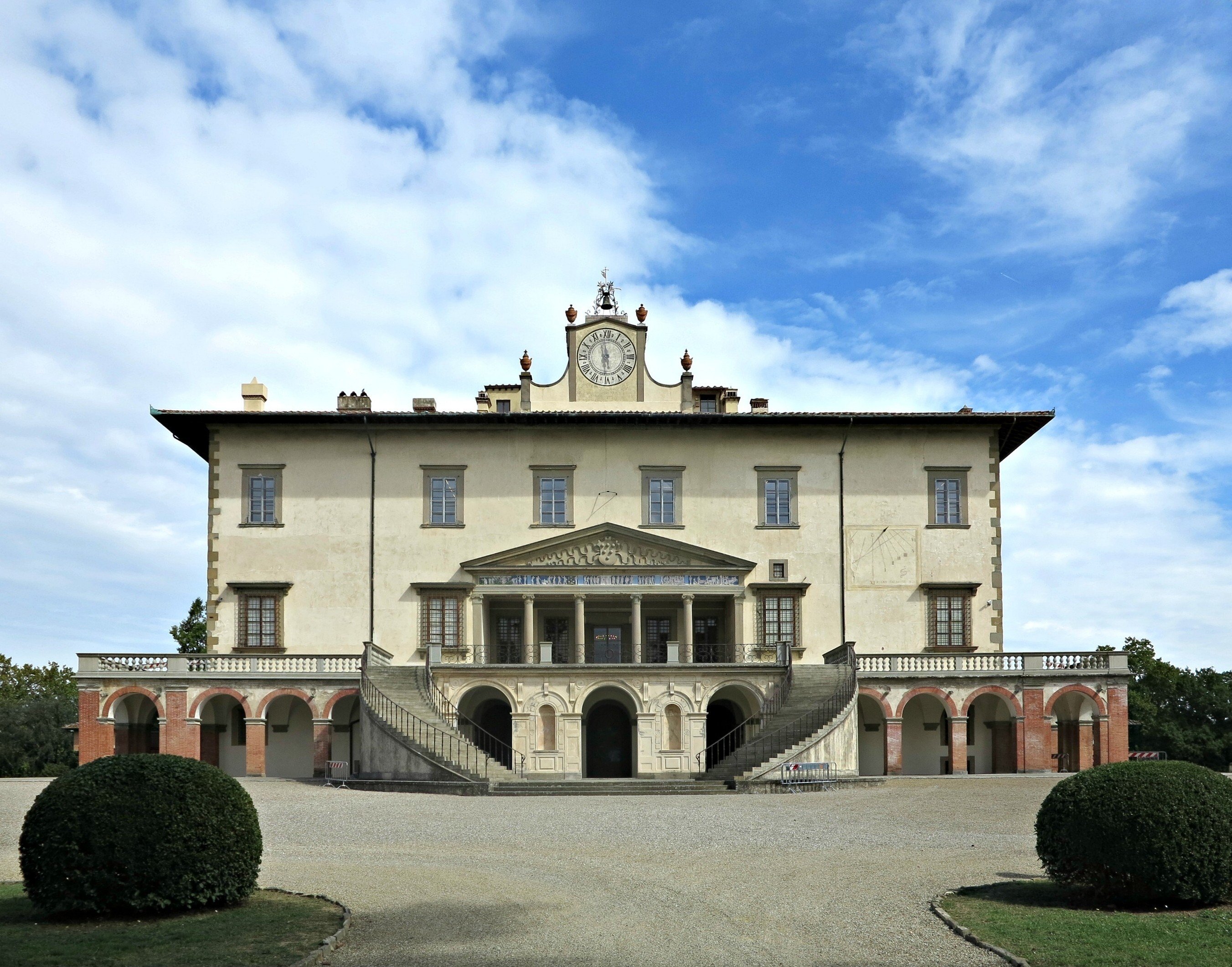
- Medici villa in Poggio a Caiano

- Coat of arms

- Location within Italy Location within Tuscany
- Coordinates: 43°49′N 11°04′E
- Country: Italy
- Region: Tuscany
- Province: Prato (PO)
- Frazioni: Bonistallo, Poggetto

Government
  - Mayor: Riccardo Palandri (centre-right oriented civic list)

Area
  - Total: 6.00 km^{2} (2.32 sq mi)
- Elevation: 45 m (148 ft)

Population (2025)
  - Total: 9,944
  - Density: 1,660/km^{2} (4,290/sq mi)
- Demonym: Poggesi
- Time zone: UTC+1 (CET)
  - Summer (DST): UTC+2 (CEST)
- Postal code: 59016
- Dialing code: 055
- Patron saint: Santa Maria
- Saint day: First Sunday of August
- Website: Official website

Poggio a Caiano is a town and comune (municipality) in the province of Prato in the region of Tuscany in Italy, located 9 kilometres (6 mi) south of the provincial capital of Prato. It has 9,944 inhabitants. The town is the birthplace of Filippo Mazzei.

== Demographics ==
Historical population

Year	Pop.	±%
1861	2,078	—
1871	2,314	+11.4%
1881	2,434	+5.2%
1901	2,784	+14.4%
1911	3,007	+8.0%
1921	2,908	−3.3%
1931	2,961	+1.8%
1936	3,067	+3.6%

Year	Pop.	±%
1951	3,392	+10.6%
1961	3,598	+6.1%
1971	4,539	+26.2%
1981	6,286	+38.5%
1991	7,941	+26.3%
2001	8,622	+8.6%
2011	9,626	+11.6%
2021	9,956	+3.4%

Source: ISTAT

== Main sights ==
=== The Medici villa ===
In 1473, a ruined fortified house at Poggio a Caiano called the Ambra, and land and a mill owned by Giovanni di Paolo Rucellai, was bought by Lorenzo de' Medici. Initially, only agricultural improvements were carried out; then in 1485, work began on the villa itself, to designs by Giuliano da Sangallo, who created a large fortified, quadrangular country house built around a central courtyard. A large central hall gave access to rooms with windows overlooking the surrounding countryside; at the time, the design was innovative.

On Lorenzo’s death in 1492, the villa was still largely unfinished; however, work resumed under Lorenzo’s second son, Giovanni, who became pope Leo X. The central hall is named after this first Medici pope.

In the following century, the Villa di Poggio a Caiano was used by successive Medici Grand Dukes of Tuscany. In 1587, Bianca Cappello and Francesco I de' Medici, Grand Duke of Tuscany died there within a day of one another after short illnesses; raising the still unsolved question of their poisoning by Francesco’s brother Ferdinand, who succeeded Francesco as Ferdinando I de' Medici, Grand Duke of Tuscany. In the 17th and 18th centuries, the architects Giuseppe and Giovan Battista Ruggeri and Antonio Maria Ferri extended the villa. Major improvements to the gardens were also carried out after it came into the ownership of Maria Luisa, Queen of Etruria.

Following the Italian unification, the villa was refurbished and used by Victor Emmanuel II of Italy. The villa was donated to the Italian state in 1919. After a long period of neglect it became a national museum in 1984 and since that date has undergone restoration. It is now open to the public.

The main attractions of the villa are the Pontormo frescoes depicting Vertumnus and Pomona in the main salon. Most of the interior has lost its original furnishings, but these are being recreated to return the villa to the state described in a 1911 inventory, when it was a residence of the Savoyard. The formal gardens, now somewhat wild, slope down to the Ombrone at the rear of the villa. Poggio also contains in the North East corner of the formal garden Cosimo I's tennis court (1543) intact but no longer in use. The palatoia (as the court was referred to in Tuscany – elsewhere known as "pallacorda") was built for Cosimo I at the same time as his court at Palazzo Pitti. The "tennis" of the Italian Renaissance was hugely popular at court and in the streets as in France where the sport is known as "jeu de paume". "Real tennis" (as it is called today), which requires a customised court with elaborate interior playing surfaces, is the model for modern tennis although the sport played in the Renaissance continues to be played today with 46 active courts in France, Australia, the UK and USA.

The villa was featured in the 1965 John Schlesinger film Darling.

=== Churches ===
- Santa Maria del Rosario in Poggio a Caiano
- Church at the Institute of Minim Sisters in Poggio a Caiano
- Parish church in Poggetto
- Chapel at Villa Castellaccio
- San Francesco in Bonistallo
- Santa Maria in Bonistallo
- Santa Cristina in Santa Cristina in Pilli
- Diana's temple at Medici Villa in Poggio a Caiano

=== Villas ===
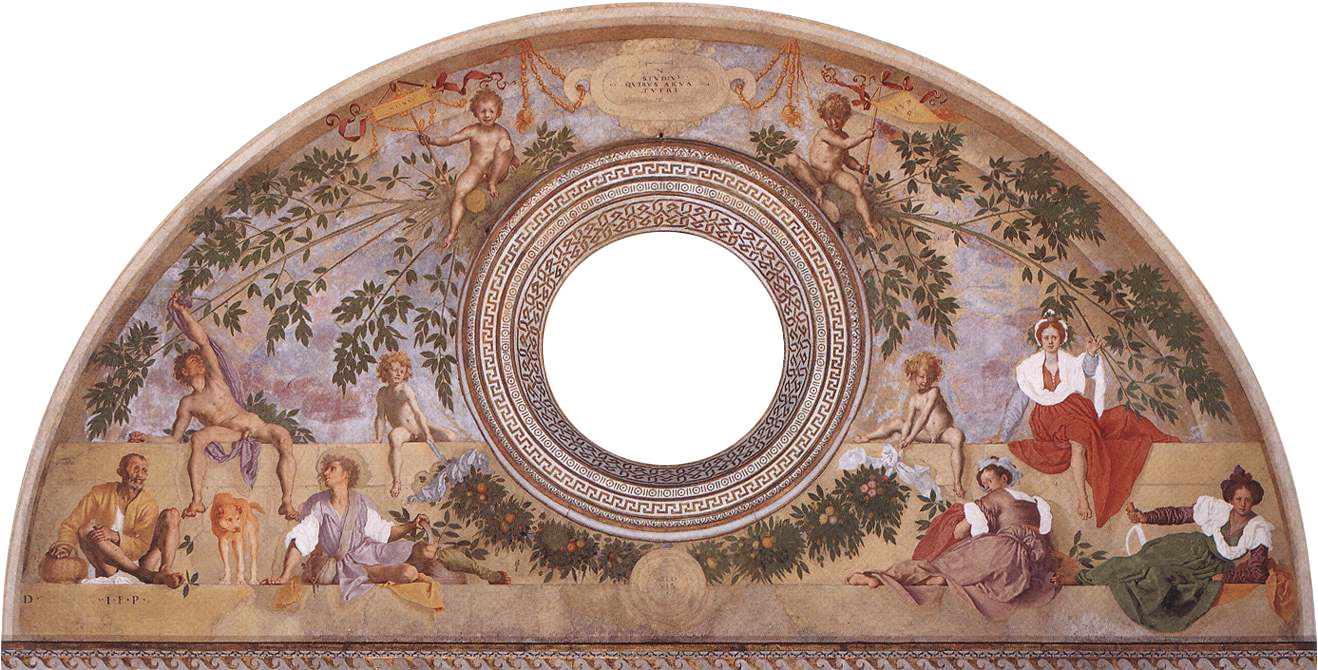
Vertumnus and Pomona: lunette frescoed by Jacopo Pontormo, in the Medici Villa.

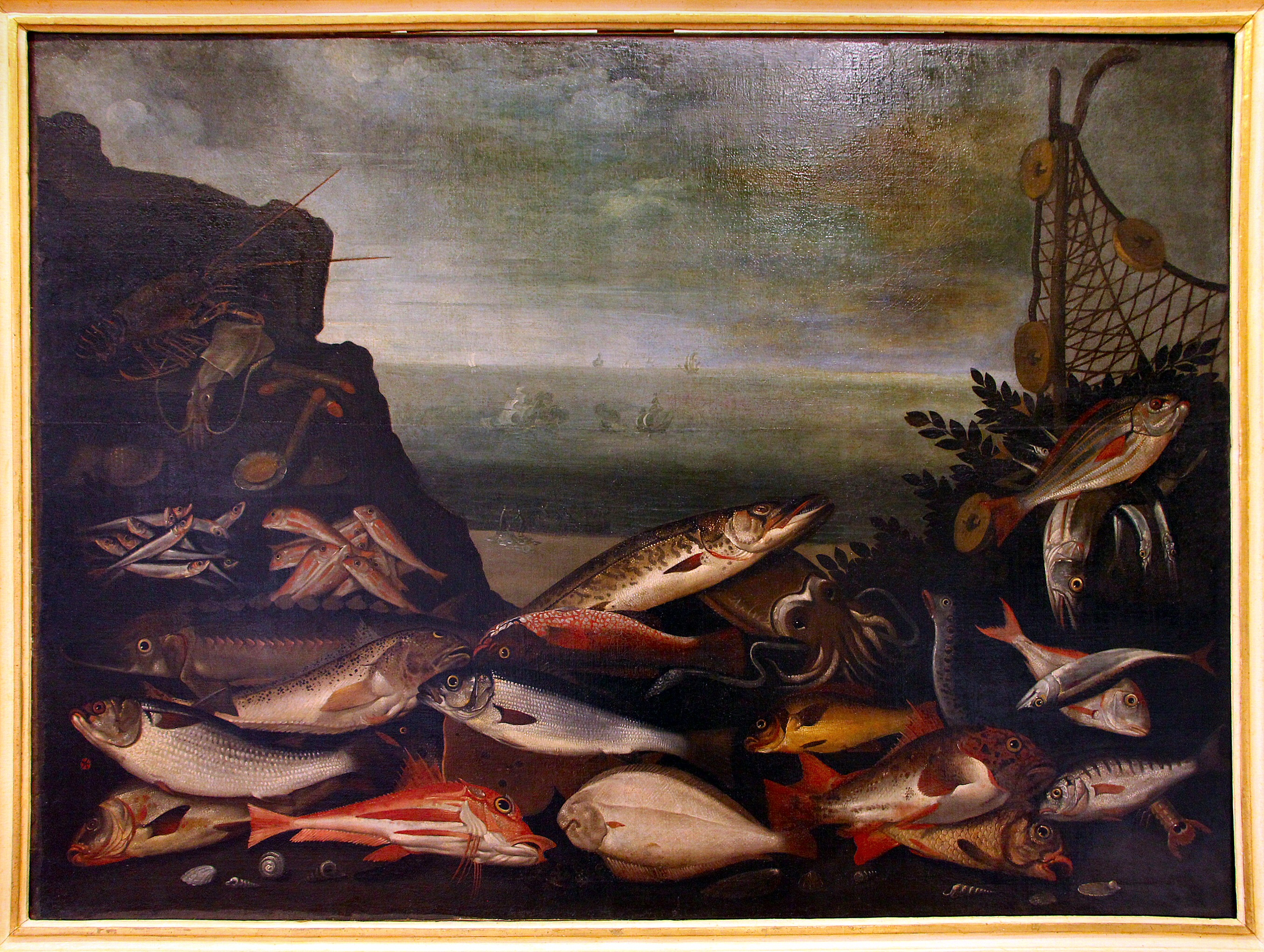
Painting of fish by Antonio Tanari, c. 1610–1630, in the Medici Villa.

- Medici Villa in Poggio a Caiano
- Villa Cirri in Poggio a Caiano
- Villa Pacetti in Poggio a Caiano
- Villa Il Cerretino in Il Cerretino
- Villa Il Poggiale in Il Poggiale
- Villa Il Castellaccio in Madonna del Violo
- Villa Magra in Madonna del Violo
- Villa Mastringalla in Poggetto

=== Other sights ===
- Medici Park in Poggetto
- Old palace with tower in Santa Cristina in Pilli
- Birthplace of Filippo Mazzei in Poggio a Caiano
- Bacco's fountain in Poggio a Caiano
- Town hall in Poggio a Caiano
- Medici Stables in Poggio a Caiano

== Feasts ==
- Siege at the Villa in Poggio a Caiano, held in September
- Antique fair in Poggio a Caiano
- Festival delle Colline, held in the whole province of Prato

== Sister towns ==
Poggio a Caiano has two sister cities:

- (United States) Charlottesville, Virginia
- Agounit, Sahrawi Arab Democratic Republic
