= SS Daniel Webster =

World War II Liberty ship of the United States

History

United States
- Name: Daniel Webster
- Namesake: Daniel Webster
- Builder: South Portland Shipbuilding Corporation, South Portland, Maine
- Yard number: 211
- Way number: 3
- Laid down: 1 November 1942
- Launched: 28 January 1943
- Identification: Official number: 242815
- Fate: Torpedoed and beached 10 January 1944; Scrapped, 1948

General characteristics
- Type: Liberty ship
- Tonnage: 7,000 long tons deadweight (DWT)
- Length: 441 ft 6 in (134.57 m)
- Beam: 56 ft 11 in (17.35 m)
- Draft: 27 ft 9 in (8.46 m)
- Propulsion: Two oil-fired boilers; Triple-expansion steam engine; Single screw; 2,500 hp (1,864 kW)
- Speed: 11 knots (20 km/h; 13 mph)
- Capacity: 9,140 tons cargo
- Complement: 41
- Armament: 1 × Stern-mounted 4 in (100 mm) deck gun; AA guns

SS Daniel Webster (MC contract 211) was a Liberty ship built in the United States during World War II.

Named after Daniel Webster, an American statesman, the ship was laid down by South Portland Shipbuilding Corporation in South Portland, Maine, at their West Yard on 1 November 1942, then launched on 28 January 1943. The ship was completed 10 February 1943 and delivered to the War Shipping Administration (WSA) for operation by Sprague Steamship Company under a WSA agreement the same day.

On 10 January 1944, she was torpedoed in the Mediterranean Sea off Oran, French Algeria in an air attack on convoy KMS 37 while en route from Gibraltar to Augusta and Naples. The ship was beached and declared a total constructive loss. The ship was sold for scrapping in a group of forty hulks on 19 December 1947 to Venturi Salvattigi Recuperi e Impresse Marrittime Societta per Azione of Genoa.
