= SS Filipp Mazzei =

Liberty ship of WWII

History

United States
- Name: Filipp Mazzei
- Namesake: Filippo Mazzei
- Owner: War Shipping Administration (WSA)
- Operator: Sprague Steamship Co., Inc.
- Ordered: as type (EC2-S-C1) hull, MC hull 2488
- Awarded: 23 April 1943
- Builder: St. Johns River Shipbuilding Company, Jacksonville, Florida
- Cost: $966,714
- Yard number: 52
- Way number: 4
- Laid down: 15 June 1944
- Launched: 31 July 1944
- Completed: 15 August 1944
- Identification: Call sign: WRRO
- Fate: Laid up in the James River Reserve Fleet, Lee Hall, Virginia, 3 September 1948; Laid up in the National Defense Reserve Fleet, Wilmington, North Carolina, 26 April 1952; Laid up in the James River Reserve Fleet, Lee Hall, Virginia, 28 March 1958; Sold for scrapping, 19 February 1960, withdrawn from fleet, 1 March 1960

General characteristics
- Class & type: Liberty ship; type EC2-S-C1, standard
- Tonnage: 10,865 LT DWT; 7,176 GRT
- Displacement: 3,380 long tons (3,434 t) (light); 14,245 long tons (14,474 t) (max)
- Length: 441 feet 6 inches (135 m) oa; 416 feet (127 m) pp; 427 feet (130 m) lwl
- Beam: 57 feet (17 m)
- Draft: 27 ft 9.25 in (8.4646 m)
- Installed power: 2 × Oil fired 450 °F (232 °C) boilers, operating at 220 psi (1,500 kPa); 2,500 hp (1,900 kW)
- Propulsion: 1 × triple-expansion steam engine, (manufactured by Filer and Stowell, Milwaukee, Wisconsin); 1 × screw propeller
- Speed: 11.5 knots (21.3 km/h; 13.2 mph)
- Capacity: 562,608 cubic feet (15,931 m^{3}) (grain); 499,573 cubic feet (14,146 m^{3}) (bale)
- Complement: 38–62 USMM; 21–40 USNAG
- Armament: Varied by ship; Bow-mounted 3-inch (76 mm)/50-caliber gun; Stern-mounted 4-inch (102 mm)/50-caliber gun; 2–8 × single 20-millimeter (0.79 in) Oerlikon anti-aircraft (AA) cannons and/or, 2–8 × 37-millimeter (1.46 in) M1 AA guns

SS Filipp Mazzei was a Liberty ship built in the United States during World War II. She was named after Filippo Mazzei, an Italian physician and close friend of Thomas Jefferson, Mazzei acted as an agent to purchase arms for Virginia during the American Revolutionary War.

== Construction ==
Filipp Mazzei was laid down on 15 June 1944, under a Maritime Commission (MARCOM) contract, MC hull 2488, by the St. Johns River Shipbuilding Company, Jacksonville, Florida; and was launched on 31 July 1944.

== History ==
She was allocated to the Sprague Steamship Co., Inc., on 9 August 1944. On 3 September 1948, she was laid up in the James River Reserve Fleet, Lee Hall, Virginia. On 26 April 1952, she was laid up in the National Defense Reserve Fleet, Wilmington, North Carolina. On 28 March 1958, she was laid up in the James River Reserve Fleet, Lee Hall, Virginia. She was sold for scrapping on 19 February 1960, to Bethlehem Steel Co., for $70,701. She was removed from the fleet on 1 March 1960.

== Bibliography ==
- "St. John's River Shipbuilding, Jacksonville FL". www.ShipbuildingHistory.com. 16 October 2010.
- Maritime Administration. "Filipp Mazzei". Ship History Database Vessel Status Card. U.S. Department of Transportation, Maritime Administration.
- Davies, James (May 2004). "Specifications (As-Built)" (PDF). p. 23.
- "SS Filipp Mazzei".
