= Constance Morrow Morgan =

American educator and trustee of Smith College (1913–1995)

- Born: Constance Cutter Morrow; 27 June 1913; Englewood, New Jersey, U.S.
- Died: 25 March 1995 (aged 81); Portland, Oregon, U.S.
- Occupations: Educator, philanthropist
- Known for: Chairman of the Board of Trustees of Smith College
- Spouse: Aubrey Niel Morgan (m. 1937; died 1985)
- Children: 4

Constance Cutter Morrow Morgan (27 June 1913 – 25 March 1995) was an American educator and former chairman of the Board of Trustees of Smith College. She also worked for the British Information Services in New York City during the Second World War and later at the British Embassy in Washington, D.C..

== Early life ==
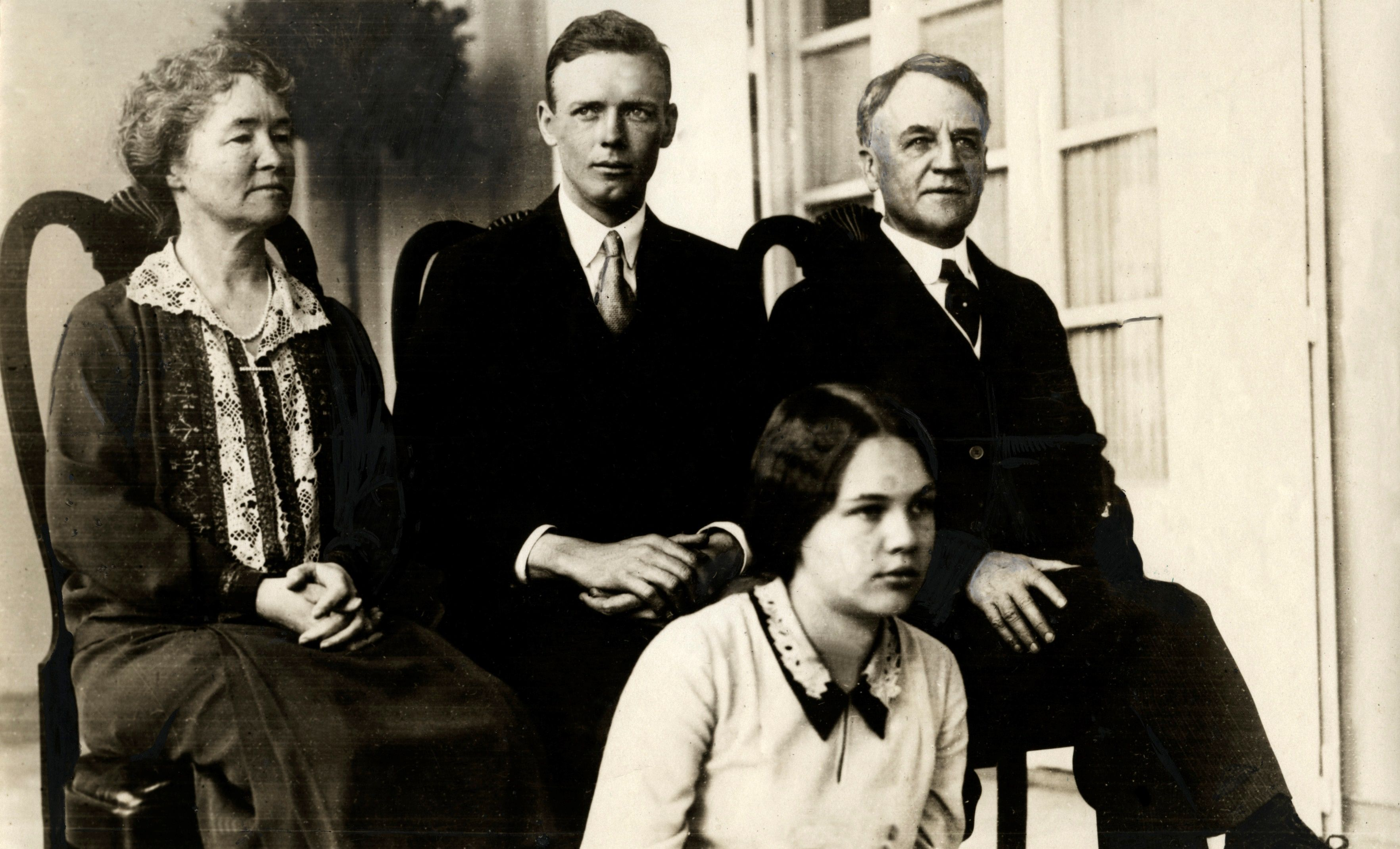
Constance Morrow with her parents and Charles Lindbergh

Morgan was born in Englewood, New Jersey, the youngest of four children. Her father was Senator Dwight Morrow, a J.P. Morgan senior partner and United States Ambassador to Mexico from 1927 to 1930. Her mother was writer and poet Elizabeth Cutter Morrow. Morgan's sister, Anne Morrow Lindbergh, married the aviator Charles Lindbergh in 1929.

In 1935 she graduated summa cum laude from Smith College, America's leading female university, and was elected to the Phi Beta Kappa honor society. She married Aubrey Niel Morgan in 1937. He had been married to Morgan's sister Elizabeth until her 1934 death. The couple had one son and three daughters.

== Career ==
During the Second World War, Morgan joined her husband in organizing a press and information service in New York, later the British Information Services. She led a team responsible for analysing American media for use by British government officials. Thus, she contributed to wartime communication between the U.S. and the United Kingdom.

After the war, the Morgans settled in Ridgefield, Washington, where they managed a dairy and timber farm. At the request of Sir Oliver Franks, the British Ambassador to the United States, they later returned to Washington, D.C., where Constance Morgan played an active social and diplomatic role at the British Embassy.

== Later life and death ==
Morgan returned to the Pacific Northwest in 1953 and became active in education and philanthropy. She served as a trustee of Smith College from 1956 to 1971, acting as chair from 1967 to 1971. She acted as a trustee of the Marshall Fellows Program as well. In 1970 she published A Distant Moment. The book is a biography of her mother who had also been chairman of the Smith board.

Morgan died of a stroke in Portland, Oregon, on 25 March 1995, aged 81.
