= Dwight Morrow =

American politician and diplomat (1873–1931)

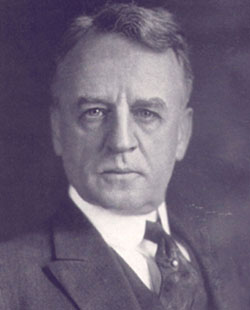

United States Senator from New Jersey
- In office December 3, 1930 – October 5, 1931
- Preceded by: David Baird, Jr.
- Succeeded by: William W. Barbour

United States Ambassador to Mexico
- In office October 29, 1927 – September 17, 1930
- President: Calvin Coolidge; Herbert Hoover
- Preceded by: James R. Sheffield
- Succeeded by: J. Reuben Clark

Personal details
- Born: Dwight Whitney Morrow; January 11, 1873 Huntington, West Virginia, U.S.
- Died: October 5, 1931 (aged 58) Englewood, New Jersey, U.S.
- Party: Republican
- Spouse: Elizabeth Cutter Morrow (m. 1903)
- Children: Dwight Whitney Morrow Jr., Constance Morrow Morgan, Anne Morrow Lindbergh, Elizabeth Reeve Morrow Morgan

Military service
- Battles/wars: World War I

Dwight Whitney Morrow (January 11, 1873 – October 5, 1931) was an American businessman, diplomat, and politician, best known as the U.S. ambassador to Mexico from 1927 to 1930, who improved bilateral relations, mediating the religious conflict in Mexico known as the Cristero War (1926–29), but also contributing to an easing of conflict between the two countries over oil. The Morrow Mission to Mexico was an "important step in the 'retreat from imperialism." A member of the Republican Party, he also served as the United States senator from New Jersey from 1930 to 1931.

He was the father of Anne Morrow and father-in-law of Charles A. Lindbergh.

== Life ==
Of Scotch-Irish descent, Morrow was born in Huntington, West Virginia. He moved with his parents, James Elmore and Clara (Johnson) Morrow, to Allegheny, Pennsylvania in 1875. His father, James, was principal of Marshall College, which is now Marshall University. Morrow's great-great-grandfather Alexander Morrow had immigrated to America from Ireland around the year 1803. Before this, Alexander's ancestors had come from Scotland. After graduating from Amherst College in 1895, Morrow studied law at Columbia Law School and began practicing at the law firm Simpson Thacher & Bartlett in New York City. In 1903, he married Elizabeth Reeve Cutter, his college sweetheart, with whom he had four children. Anne Morrow, his daughter, later married Charles A. Lindbergh, whom she met while her father was Ambassador to Mexico. In 1913, he became a partner at J.P. Morgan & Co., one of the largest and most powerful commercial and investment banks in the United States during this era, financially backing industrial giants such as General Motors and 3M. As a partner at Morgan, he served as a director on many corporate and financial boards.

With the onset of World War I in Europe, the bank lent Britain and France large sums of money with which they purchased war materials in the U.S. When the United States entered the war, Morrow became the director of the National War Savings Committee for the State of New Jersey. He also served abroad as an adviser to the Allied Maritime Transport Council and as a civilian member of the Military Board of Allied Supply. With his proven logistical and intellectual talents, Morrow was sent to France by President Woodrow Wilson to serve as chief civilian aide to General John J. Pershing.

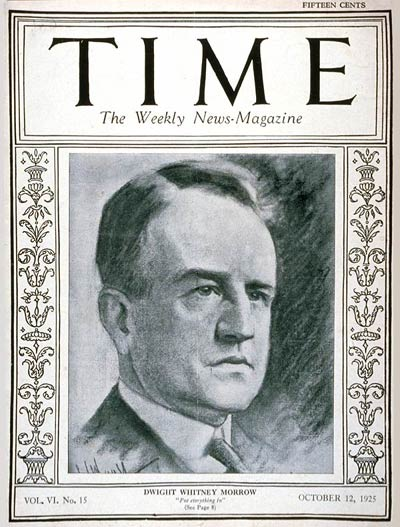
Time cover, October 12, 1925

In 1925, Morrow was summoned by his old Amherst College classmate and friend, President Calvin Coolidge, to lead a board of inquiry into aviation in the U.S. In September of that year, Coolidge ordered the court-martial of Colonel Billy Mitchell of the Army Air Service for "conduct prejudicial to good order and military discipline." The trial was scheduled for November. Anticipating adverse political reaction to the trial and seeking to shape aviation policy in accordance with his own economic views, Coolidge asked Morrow to head a board of military and civilian aviation experts to inquire into all aspects of aviation. The board's report, published before Mitchell's conviction, recommended the creation of an Air Corps within the Army equivalent to the Signal Corps or Quartermaster Corps, which resulted in the establishment of the U.S. Army Air Corps in July 1926.

== Ambassador to Mexico ==
Morrow was appointed United States Ambassador to Mexico by Coolidge from 1927 to 1930. Upon learning the news, the Mexican press had expected that the appointment of a partner of the financial firm J.P. Morgan was "a return to Dollar Diplomacy." However, the Coolidge administration planned on changing relations between Mexico and the U.S., which Morrow was to implement. One of Morrow's first acts in Mexico was to change the sign identifying the embassy from "American Embassy" to "United States Embassy"; the appropriation of the words "America" and "American" to refer solely to the United States had long rankled other countries in the hemisphere, including Mexico.

Morrow was widely hailed as a brilliant ambassador, mixing popular appeal with sound economic and financial advice to the Mexican government. In 1927, he invited popular humorist-actor Will Rogers and famed aviator Charles Lindbergh for a goodwill tour of Mexico. His daughter, Anne Morrow, was introduced to Lindbergh, and the two were soon engaged. To thank the town of Cuernavaca, where Morrow owned a vacation home, Morrow hired the Mexican artist Diego Rivera to paint murals in the Palace of Cortez, which are a chronicle of Mexican history from a post-Mexican Revolution point of view.

Morrow initiated a series of breakfast meetings with President Plutarco Elías Calles (1924–1928), at which the two would discuss a range of issues, from oil and irrigation to a religious uprising in Mexico. This earned Morrow the nickname "ham and eggs diplomat" in U.S. newspapers. Morrow also invited Rogers to accompany him and Calles on a tour of Mexico, with Rogers sending favorable human-interest stories about Mexico and Mexicans back to U.S. newspapers, helping to change U.S. perceptions of Mexico.

In a dispute about Mexican petroleum, with U.S. and other foreign oil companies demanding protection of their interests in Mexico, Morrow reaffirmed the rights of American oil companies through the Calles-Morrow Agreement and helped prevent Mexican nationalization of the oilfields. The nationalization did, however, occur ten years later in 1938.

Morrow's best known accomplishment was his mediation of the conflict between the Mexican government and the Catholic Church in Mexico which had escalated into a violent armed revolt, known as the Cristero rebellion. It was not in the security interests of the United States for such internal disorder to be occurring in its neighbor to the south, not least because of the flight of Mexican refugees to the U.S. from the regions of conflict. Morrow's efforts at mediation were successful, and he was aided by Father John J. Burke of the National Catholic Welfare Conference. The Vatican was also actively seeking peace in Mexico.

After the assassination in 1928 of the newly re-elected President Álvaro Obregón, former president Calles was ineligible to serve again due to term limits, and the Mexican Congress named Emilio Portes Gil as president. In practice, Calles remained in power during a period known as the Maximato. As interim president in December 1928, Portes Gil permitted Morrow and Burke to revitalize their peace initiative. Portes Gil told a foreign correspondent on May 1 that "the Catholic clergy, when they wish, may renew the exercise of their rites with only one obligation, that they respect the laws of the land."

Morrow managed to bring the war parties to agreement on June 21, 1929. His office drafted a pact called the arreglos (agreement) that permitted worship to resume in Mexico and granted three concessions to the Catholics: only priests who were named by hierarchical superiors would be required to register; religious instruction in the churches (but not in the schools) would be permitted; and all citizens, including the clergy, would be allowed to make petitions to reform the laws. The anticlerical articles of the Constitution of 1917 remained in place but were not systematically enforced.

== Later career ==
In 1930 Morrow was elected as a Republican to the United States Senate to fill the vacancy caused by the resignation of Walter Evans Edge. At the same time, he was elected for the full term commencing on March 4, 1931. He was elected to the American Philosophical Society that same year. He served in the Senate from December 3, 1930, until his death in Englewood, New Jersey, on October 5, 1931.

== Death ==
Following a speaking engagement in New York City, Morrow suffered a stroke in his sleep at his home in Englewood, New Jersey, and died the next afternoon on October 5, 1931.

A partner at J.P. Morgan, Morrow was one of the richest men in New Jersey. Morrow's death occurred within 30 days of the next election, allowing the Republican Governor Morgan Foster Larson to appoint William Warren Barbour as Morrow's successor in the U.S. Senate.

Morrow was interred at Brookside Cemetery in Englewood.

Morrow's will was dated January 24, 1927, and made over $1 million in specific bequests, including $200,000 to Amherst College, $200,000 to Smith College, $100,000 to the Smithsonian Institution, and several other bequests to family and friends. The estate was valued at about $10 million (equivalent to $185 million in 2025). The large $1,000,000 in estate taxes paid to the state of New Jersey enabled the state to balance their books. In addition, a $1 million trust fund had been set up for Anne Morrow Lindbergh in 1929.

Morrow's personal papers are held by the Archives & Special Collections in the Robert Frost Library at Amherst College. In 1934, Betty Morrow requested that the British diplomat and writer Harold Nicolson write the definitive biography of her late husband. Nicolson stayed with the family at Englewood and in Maine for several months, drawing on interviews with them, Morrow's partners at J.P. Morgan, and with former Mexican president Plutarco Elias Calles for his book. It was published as Dwight Morrow in October 1935.

=== Legacy ===
Dwight Morrow High School, founded in 1932, was named in his honor. It is a public school serving students in Englewood and Englewood Cliffs, New Jersey.

The World War II Liberty Ship SS Dwight W. Morrow was named in his honor.

== In popular culture ==
He was portrayed by Bruce Greenwood in the 2012 film For Greater Glory set during the Cristero War.

== See also ==
- List of covers of Time magazine (1920s)
- List of members of the United States Congress who died in office (1900–1949)
- List of people from Morelos

== Sources ==
- Nicolson, Harold (1975) Dwight Morrow. Ayer Publishing ISBN 0405069820 (originally published 1935)

U.S. Senate
Preceded by David Baird, Jr.	United States Senator from New Jersey; 1930–1931	Succeeded by W. Warren Barbour
Party political offices
Preceded by Walter E. Edge	Republican Nominee for the U.S. Senate (Class 2) from New Jersey; 1930	Succeeded by W. Warren Barbour
Diplomatic posts
Preceded by James R. Sheffield	U.S. Ambassador to Mexico; 1927–1930	Succeeded by J. Reuben Clark
