= Calles-Morrow Agreement =

The Calles-Morrow Agreement was brokered on the cusp of Mexican oil expropriation. Political actors from Mexico and the United States negotiated the settlement over the course of 1927 and 1928, after “a decade of wrangling” between the two countries that followed the creation of the Mexican Constitution of 1917. Calles-Morrow affirmed the legitimacy of oil-land titles obtained, and maintained, by foreign industries prior to the ratification of the 1917 Constitution. The political statement conveyed by the accord remains a topic of interpretive debate. Some historians argue that Calles-Morrow revealed a delicate partiality on the part of Mexican president Plutarco Elías Calles toward foreign companies: concisely summarized, “where ‘positive acts’ had been performed prior to 1917, the companies received confirmatory concessions of indefinite duration.” Others more drastically assert that through this agreement, Calles “attempted completely to surrender the country to foreign imperialism.”

Upon President Calles’ entrance into office, it appeared as though his predecessor, Álvaro Obregón’s, “personal promise to ease the pressure on the oil firms” would disintegrate under the new administration. When he served as the minister of industry, then-General Calles had attempted to negotiate an interim agreement affording “provisional” oil-drilling permits to international operators, contingent on their compliance with regulations determined by the Mexican government. Foreign oil executives recoiled at the proposition, however, as they were “no more willing to comply with future legislation… than to pay royalties on land they already held under private contract.” Tensions between Calles’ administration and oil companies escalated to such an extent that in early 1927, foreign outfits began drilling illegally with the intention of prompting a governmental counter-response. Sensing the looming menace of U.S. military involvement, Calles directed Mexican troops to seal oil wells and valves, before finally commanding General Lázaro Cárdenas to execute arson, strategically, at foreign-oil sites. At the heart of the confrontation was a desire—notably shared by both sides—to resolve the fiscal and constitutional uncertainties (e.g. exactions and “pre-constitutional property rights”) surrounding oil production, following the drastic redefinitions that emerged from the Mexican Revolution.

With the financial downturn that occurred in Mexico in 1927, Calles came to view an accord with foreign oil companies as an economic exigency. However, the president remained “well aware of national [aversion toward] placing the control of natural resources in the hands of foreigners,” so he strove, in a shrewd political move, to “criticize[] the foreign oil companies while simultaneously creating a legal basis for their continued operation in Mexico.” As an agreement appeared increasingly imminent, social commentators of the day remarked that Calles’ possessed three potential directions: he could “actually confiscate oil fields held by Americans”; continue professing support for the 1917 Constitution, while avoiding any sort of concrete confiscation measures, behind the scenes; or else “admit the legality of American titles to Mexican oil lands.”

Into the scene stepped U.S. Ambassador Dwight Morrow, a former “corporate lawyer and partner in… J.P. Morgan” whose banking history linked him to a number of Mexico’s creditors. Morrow made a significant impression on Calles, who proved receptive to Morrow’s alleged “face-saving solution… [in which the] Mexican Supreme Court would declare the [existing petroleum] law to be ex post facto.” As a result of the pair’s relative rapport, the titular agreement finally took shape. Calles’ government altered the standing Petroleum Act of 1925 to permit the extension of so-called “confirmatory concessions” to oil corporations that had obtained their subsoil rights before the midway mark of 1917. These concessions were dealt to applicant oil companies “without limitation[s] of time.” Further, Calles successfully lobbied the State Department to embrace the notion of “positive acts,” in which corporations would relinquish claims to “pre-1917 oil reserves on which they had made no improvements.”

Oil companies did not receive the Calles-Morrow agreement well, as many claimed that “the new legislation did not go far enough” in securing them a lasting presence in Mexico. Finding the concept of “concessions” to be condescending, recalcitrant petroleum executives desired “an amendment to the 1917 Constitution or a comprehensive definition of what were their rights on May 1, 1917.” Nonetheless, on the whole, U.S.-Mexican relations proceeded amicably for the remainder of Calles’ tenure, largely due to the Mexican president’s increasingly conservative leanings, which advantaged U.S. commercial interests. In the end, however, Calles’ successor, Lázaro Cárdenas, effectively dismantled the Calles-Morrow agreement as he initiated an economic transition “from a phase of postrevolutionary reconstruction… to one of depression-induced industrialization and state intervention,” which manifested, finally, in the Mexican oil expropriation.
