= A Nation of Immigrants =

1958 book by John F. Kennedy

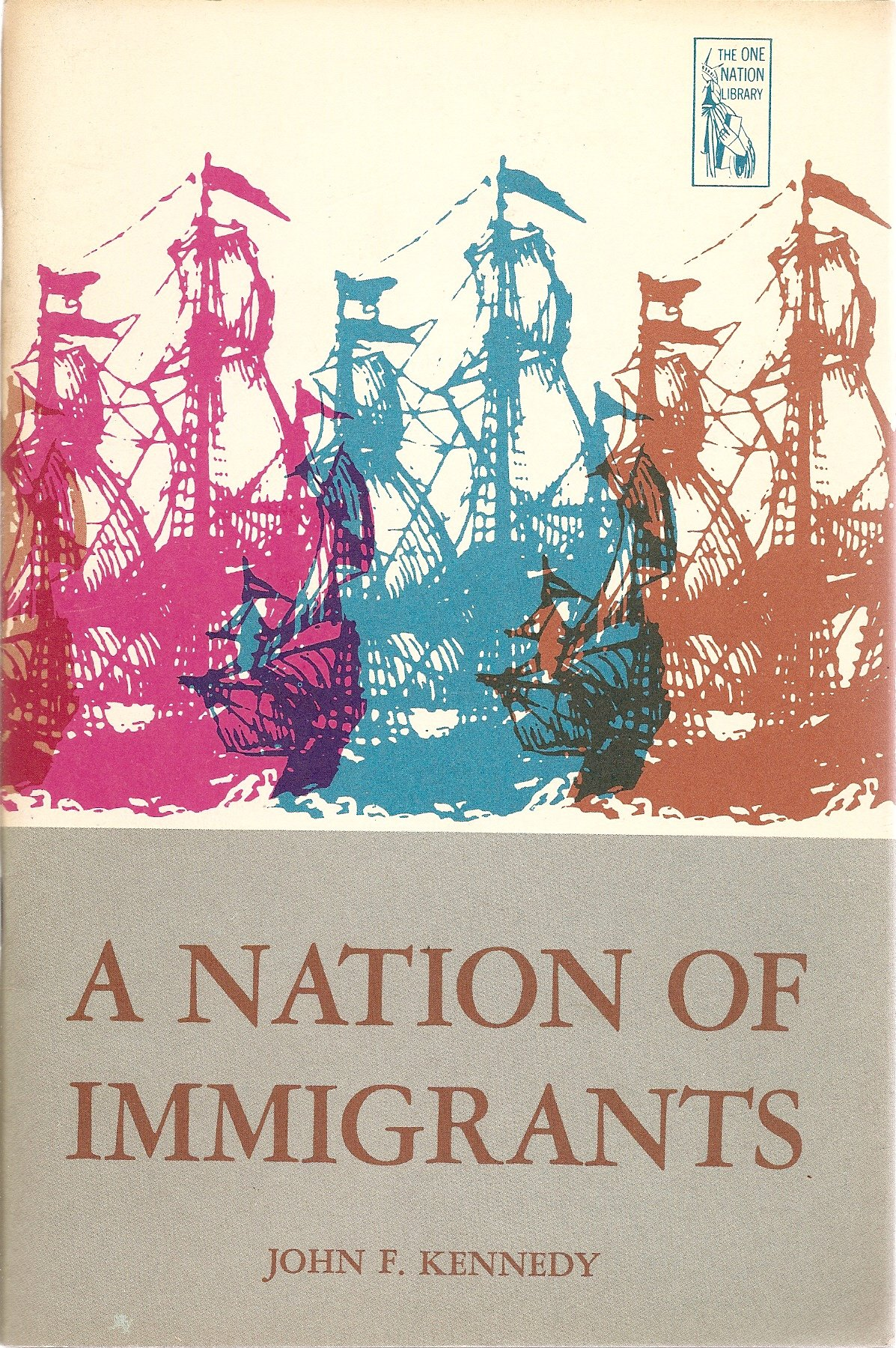
- First edition cover
- Author: John F. Kennedy
- Language: English
- Subject: United States--Emigration and immigration
- Published: 1958
- Publisher: Anti-Defamation League of B'nai B'rith
- Publication place: United States
- Pages: 40
- ISBN: 978-0-06-144754-9
- OCLC: 1016627
- Dewey Decimal: 325.73
- LC Class: JV6453 .K4 1963

A Nation of Immigrants (ISBN 978-0-06-144754-9) is a 1958 book on American immigration by then U.S. Senator John F. Kennedy of Massachusetts.

The name of the book is a reference to the fact that the United States is a country whose population is predominantly made up of immigrants and their recent descendants, who settled the country following the European colonization of the Americas and the establishment of the Thirteen Colonies.

== History ==
The book was written by Kennedy in 1958, while he was still a senator. It was written as part of the Anti-Defamation League's series entitled the One Nation Library. In the 1950s, former ADL National Director Ben Epstein was concerned by rising xenophobia and anti-immigrant rhetoric, so he reached out to then-Senator Kennedy to write a manuscript on immigration reform.

Subsequently, after gaining the presidency, Kennedy called on Congress to undertake a full reevaluation of immigration law; and he began to revise the book for further publication. In August 1963, excerpts of the 1958 pamphlet were published in The New York Times Magazine. Kennedy's assassination took place before he could complete the revision, but the book was posthumously published in 1964 with an introduction by his brother, then Attorney General Robert F. Kennedy.

The book was re-issued by the Anti-Defamation League in 2008. The 2018 edition was endorsed by former Secretary of State Madeleine K. Albright and then-U.S. Senator Marco Rubio.

== Summary ==
The book includes a map.

The book contains a short history of immigration from Colonial America onwards, an analysis of the importance of immigration in US history, and proposals to liberalize immigration law.
