= Elizabeth Cutter Morrow =

American poet

- Born: Elisabeth Reeve Cutter; May 29, 1873; Cleveland, Ohio, U.S.
- Died: January 24, 1955 (aged 81)
- Occupations: Educator, writer
- Spouse: Dwight Morrow (m. 1903; died 1931)
- Children: 4, including Anne

Elizabeth Reeve Cutter Morrow (May 29, 1873 – January 24, 1955) was an American poet, champion of women's education, and purveyor of Mexican culture. She wrote several children's books and collections of poetry. She and her husband, ambassador Dwight Morrow, collected a wide variety of art while in Mexico and helped popularize Mexican folk art in the United States.

== Early life ==
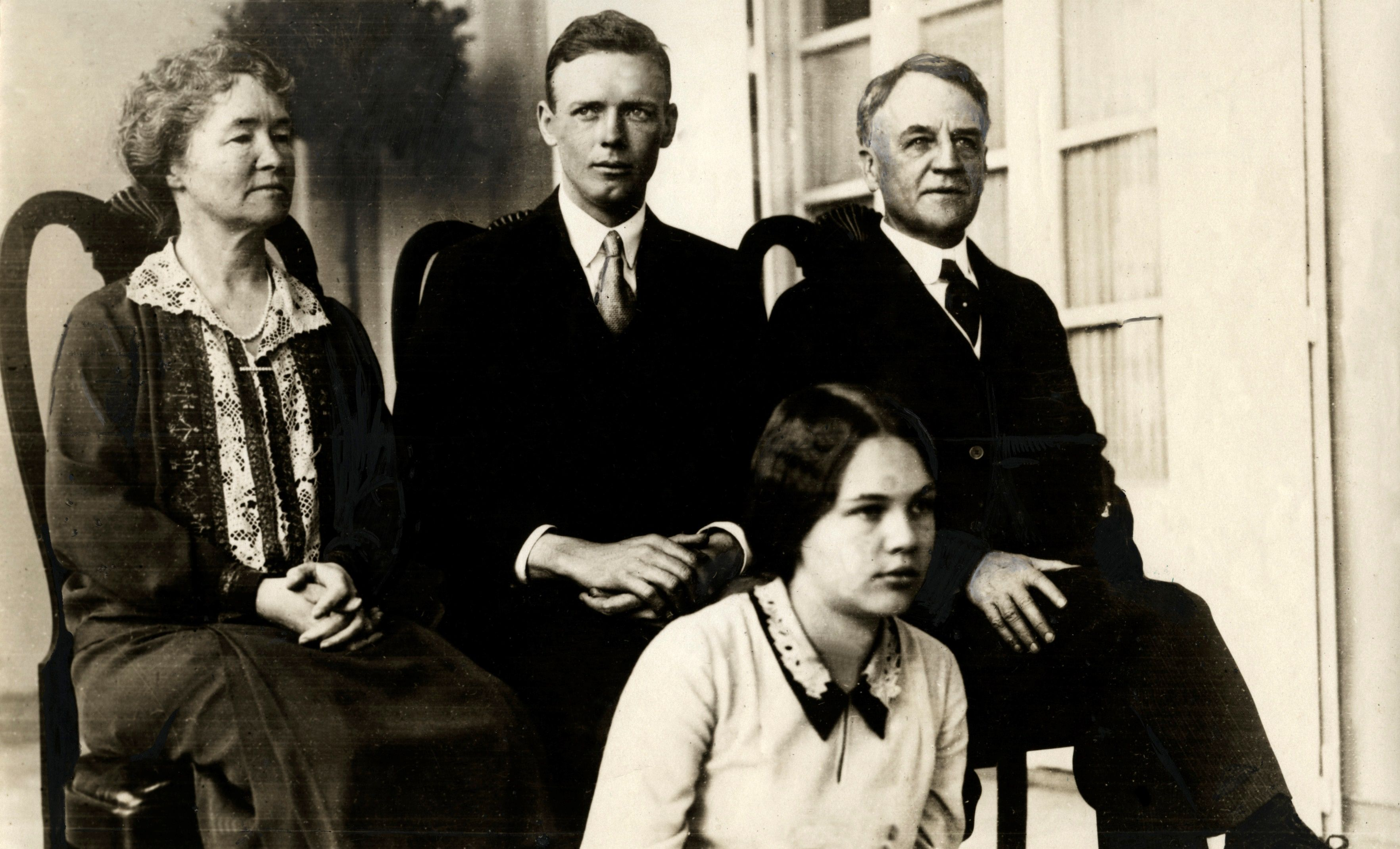
Constance Morrow and her parents with Charles Lindbergh

Elizabeth Reeve Cutter, called Betty, was born in Cleveland, Ohio, to Charles Cutter and Annie Spencer Cutter. Besides her twin sister Mary, Betty had three younger sisters. The Cutters lived in Cleveland with their extended family before moving in 1888 to a home Charles built nearby. Annie Cutter raised her children to be pious and respect etiquette, and the Bible was a regular study tool in the Cutters' home. Betty learned to love reading and writing from the Hebrew Bible and the New Testament.

Both Mary and Betty were sickly children, and, in 1879, both sisters became ill enough that the family decided to move to New Orleans, Louisiana. Supposedly, the warm weather would cure the girls' sickness. The trip South was meant to be temporary, but Mary's declining health kept the family in New Orleans. On November 22, 1882, Mary died from tuberculosis. Afterwards, Mrs. Cutter became overprotective about Betty's health. In March 1883 Betty was sent to live with her uncle John Spencer, a medical doctor in Dayton, Ohio. Betty disliked her trips to Dayton and began a lifelong habit of writing in a diary to cope with her stress. Through this exercise, she met her uncle Arthur, who encouraged her love of books and writing. Betty's health recovered, and in 1888, she went to the Republican Convention with her uncle Charles, a wealthy man. Betty yearned to live like her uncle, but this dream seemed unattainable as the family lived in modest financial circumstances.

Cutter attended Smith College from 1892 to 1896. The summer before her sophomore year, her father lost his job and was unable to pay for tuition, so her uncle Arthur paid for her remaining years at Smith. During her sophomore year, Dwight Morrow began a courting with Betty after they met at a dance.

== Life ==
After graduating from Smith, Cutter started "parlor-teaching." She gave six talks a week on Henrik Ibsen's plays from the comfort of her cousin's home.

In the summer of 1899, the Cutter family went abroad to Europe and would not return until the spring of 1901. She continued to write letters to Dwight Morrow during this time. They married on June 16, 1903. The Morrows settled in Englewood, New Jersey. They moved into a small house and over the course of seven years the family would move two more times into increasingly larger homes until they settled in their final home, named Next Day Hill estate (a verbal play on the world "tomorrow").

The Morrows had four children, including Anne Morrow Lindbergh (1906-2001), wife of Charles Lindbergh, and Elisabeth Morrow (1904-1934), founder of The Elisabeth Morrow School. Her youngest children were Dwight Whitney Jr. (1908-1976), and Constance Cutter (1913-1995). Her days were occupied by attending many clubs; she belonged to organizations such as the Community Chest, The Red Cross, The Children's Aid Society, The Presbyterian Church, and The Smith College Club.

=== Mexico ===
In 1927 Dwight Morrow was appointed by President Calvin Coolidge as the U.S. ambassador to Mexico. At first, Betty did not like her husband's assignment in Mexico, for they had to move from their home in New Jersey and she viewed this as a type of exile. However, she soon grew to love Mexican culture. She often remarked on the grandeur of the embassy and of the warm welcome they received In Mexico, the couple built a small house in Cuernavaca they named Casa Mañana. There they gathered a large collection of Mexican folk art and hired a large number of local artists to create fountains and a mural around the estate.

After leaving Mexico in 1930, the Morrow's collection of art grew in popularity among U.S. audiences, and an exhibition of the art toured the country. Their large collection of art helped to popularize Mexican folk art.

After her husband died in his sleep in 1931 Morrow would continue to visit Casa Mañana for up to a month every spring. During such trips, she would fund projects to restore the murals that she and her husband had commissioned. In her later years, Betty wrote on her time in Mexico in several books: The Painted Pig, Casa Manana, and The Mexican Years.

In widowhood, she became the first female president of Smith College, acting in the office from 1939 to 1940, but she was never officially granted the title.

== Death ==
In November 1954, Betty suffered a stroke, fell into a coma, and died on January 24, 1955.

=== Legacy ===
Elizabeth Morrow is remembered as a philanthropist and an advocate for women's education. During her later years, she donated her husband's documents to Amherst College, his alma mater, and Betty's documents from her time as acting president at Smith College are preserved in their archives.

== Selected works ==
- The Painted Pig (1930) (Illustrated by Rene D'Harnoncourt)
- Quatrains for My Daughter (1931)
- Casa Mañana (1932) (Illustrated by William Spratling)
- The Rabbit's Nest (1940)
- Shannon (1940) (Illustrated by Helen Torrey)

== Bibliography ==
- Danly, Susan (2001). "The Morrows in Mexico". Hopscotch: A Cultural Review. 2 (4): 86–88.
- Delpar, Susan (1992). The Enormous Vogue of Things Mexican: Cultural Relations Between the United States and Mexico, 1920-1935. University of Alabama Press.
- Hertog, Susan (November 1999). Anne Morrow Lindbergh: Her Life. Random House. ISBN 0-385-46973-X.
- Lopez, Rick A. (2002). "The Morrows in Mexico". In Danly, Susan; Stavans, Ilan (eds.). Casa Manana: The Morrow Collection of Mexican Popular Arts. University of New mexico Press. pp. 47–63.
- Morgan, Constance Morrow (1977). A Distant Moment: The Youth, Education, and Courtship of Elizabeth Cutter Morrow. Smith College. ISBN 0-87391-015-X.
