= George Hay =

George Hay may refer to:

- George Hay, 7th Earl of Erroll (1508–1573), Scottish nobleman and politician
- George Hay (Virginia judge) (1765–1830), United States politician and judge
- George Hay (politician) (1715–1778), Member of Parliament and Dean of the Arches
- George Hay (bishop) (1729–1811), Vicar Apostolic of Lowland Scotland
- George Hay (ice hockey) (1898–1975), Canadian hockey forward
- George Hay (minister) (c.1530–1588), Church of Scotland minister
- George D. Hay (1895–1968), country music pioneer
- George Hay (writer), British science fiction author, founder of the Science Fiction Foundation
- George Hay, 1st Earl of Kinnoull (1570–1634), Lord Chancellor of Scotland
- George Hay, 2nd Earl of Kinnoull (1596–1644), Scottish peer, military officer, and political official
- George Hay, 3rd Earl of Kinnoull (died 1650), Scottish peer and military officer
- George Hay, 5th Earl of Kinnoull (died 1687), Scottish peer and soldier
- George Hay, 8th Earl of Kinnoull (1689–1758)
- George Hay, 7th Marquess of Tweeddale (1753–1804), Scottish peer
- George Hay, 16th Earl of Erroll (1767–1798), Scottish peer and soldier
- George Hay, 12th Earl of Kinnoull (1827–1897)
- George Hay, 14th Earl of Kinnoull (1902–1938), Scottish peer
- George Hay, 8th Marquess of Tweeddale (1787–1876), British field marshal
- George Hay, fictional character in the play Moon Over Buffalo
- George Hay (cricketer) (1851–1913), English cricketer who played for Derbyshire, 1875–1886
- George Hay (footballer) fl. 1930s, Scottish footballer for Third Lanark and Queen of the South
- George Campbell Hay (1915–1984), Scottish poet
- George Hay, Earl of Gifford (1822–1862), British Liberal Party politician
- George Hay (artist) (1831–1912), Scottish artist

== See also ==
- George Hays (disambiguation)
- George Hayes (disambiguation)
