= Charles Hay, 16th Earl of Kinnoull =

Scottish hereditary peer

The Right Honourable The Earl of Kinnoull DL
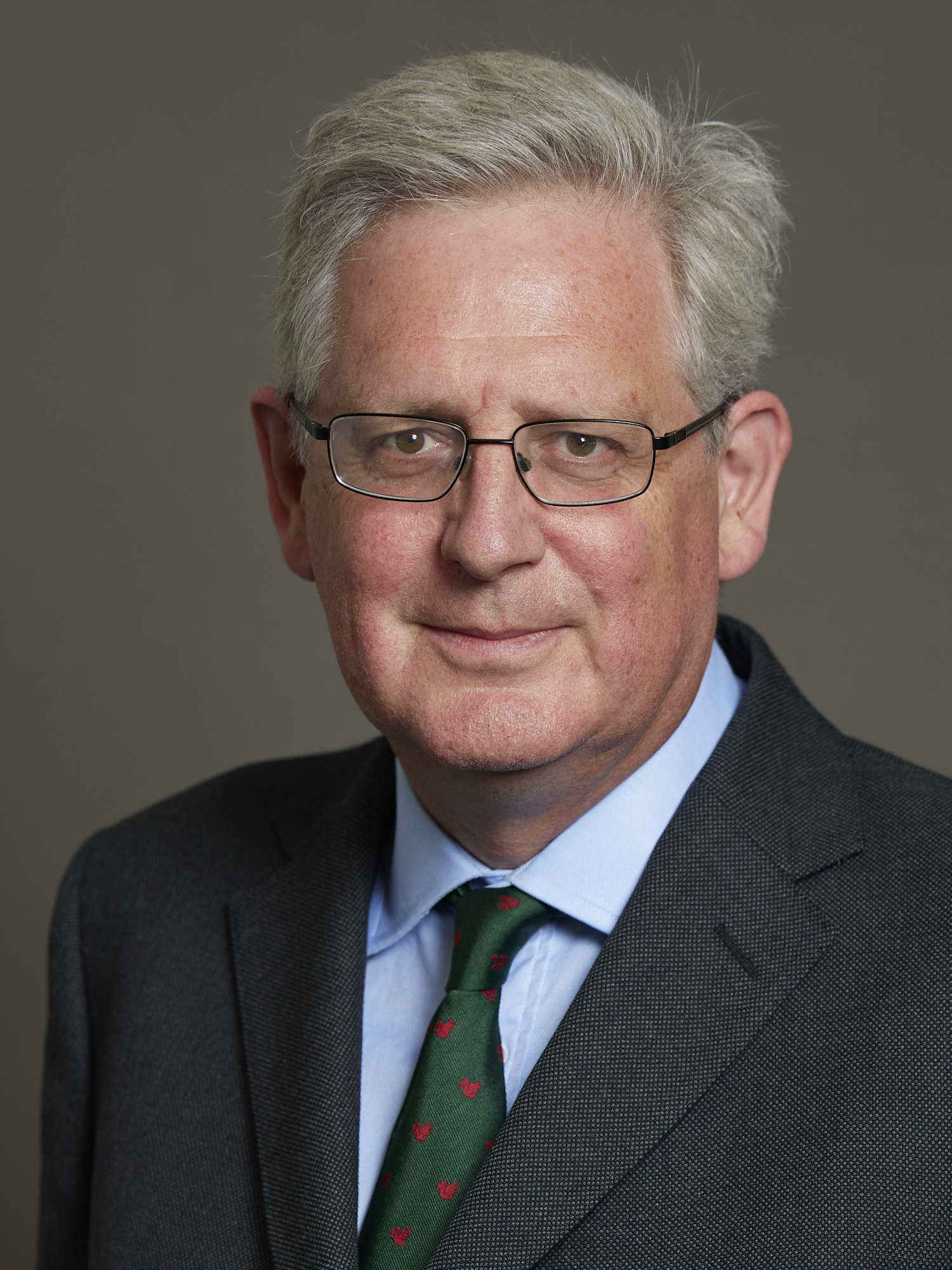
- Official portrait, 2023

Convenor of the Crossbench Peers
- Incumbent
- Assumed office 28 April 2023
- Preceded by: The Lord Judge

Member of the House of Lords Lord Temporal
- Incumbent
- Life peerage 6 February 2026
- Elected hereditary peer 6 February 2015 – 29 April 2026
- By-election: 2015
- Preceded by: The 21st Lady Saltoun
- Succeeded by: Seat abolished

Personal details
- Born: Charles William Harley Hay; 20 December 1962 (age 63)
- Spouse: Clare Crawford (m. 2002)
- Children: Lady Alice Hay; Lady Catriona Hay; Lady Auriol Hay; William Hay, Viscount Dupplin
- Parents: William Hay, 15th Earl of Kinnoull; Ann Gay Lowson
- Education: Christ Church, Oxford
- Occupation: Barrister

Charles William Harley Hay, 16th Earl of Kinnoull, Baron Kinnoull of the Ochils (born 20 December 1962), styled Viscount Dupplin until 2013, is a Scottish politician and hereditary peer who serves as a Crossbench member of the House of Lords and as Convenor of the Crossbench Peers. He was created a life peer in 2026 to allow him to remain in the House of Lords.

== Biography ==
Viscount Dupplin was educated at Eton College and studied chemistry at Christ Church, Oxford. where he was an open scholar. A qualified barrister, called to the Bar in 1990 (Middle Temple) he worked for insurance provider Hiscox for 25 years. He also farms in Perthshire.

He has been a member of The Queen's Bodyguard for Scotland (Royal Company of Archers) since 2000.

He succeeded his father as Earl of Kinnoull following the latter's death on 7 June 2013.

The Earl was elected to sit in the House of Lords at a crossbench hereditary peers' by-election on 4 February 2015, following the resignation of Lady Saltoun of Abernethy.

On 19 March 2015, he made his maiden speech in the House of Lords on a report of the Science & Technology Committee. In June 2015 he was appointed to the Select Committee on Social Mobility. In 2016, he served on the Select Committee on the Trade Union Bill.

In May 2016, he was appointed to the Select Committee on the European Union and also the Justice Sub-Committee. In September 2019 he became Chair of the European Union Committee, and Principal Deputy Chairman of Committees of the House of Lords;. He has served as a Deputy Speaker since becoming Principal Deputy Chairman of Committees. In January 2022 he was appointed Vice Chair of the UK delegation to the Parliamentary Partnership Assembly, the new joint body between the European and UK Parliaments. As such he was the leader of the House of Lords delegation.

In June 2017, he was promoted to Lt Col and became commanding officer of the Atholl Highlanders.

In January 2018, he was appointed a deputy lieutenant of Perth and Kinross.

In April 2023, he became Convenor of the Crossbench Peers and as a consequence in June 2023 stepped down as Chair of the European Affairs Committee and as Vice Chair of the UK delegation to the Parliamentary Partnership Assembly. At the same time he was appointed to the House of Lords Commission.

On 10 December 2025, it was announced that a life peerage would be conferred on him as part of the 2025 Political Peerages. On 6 February 2026, he was created Baron Kinnoull of the Ochils, of Abernyte in the County of Perthshire.

== Family ==
He is the son of William Hay, 15th Earl of Kinnoull, and Ann (née Lowson), daughter of Sir Denys Lowson, 1st Baronet.

In 2002, he married Clare, daughter of the circuit judge William Hamilton Crawford, QC, and his wife, Marilyn Jean Colville. The couple has four children:

- Lady Alice Hay (b. 25 Sep 2003)
- Lady Catriona Hay (b. 25 Sep 2003)
- Lady Auriol Hay (b. 15 Mar 2007)
- William Hay, Viscount Dupplin (b. 24 Jun 2011)

== Charity ==
Hay serves as president of the Royal Caledonian Ball Trust, which organises an annual ball to benefit Scottish charities. He is the chairman of the Red Squirrel Survival Trust, a wildlife conservation trust. He is also the chair of Culture Perth & Kinross, which is a Trust running museums and libraries.

Peerage of Scotland
Preceded by William Hay	Earl of Kinnoull; 2013–present	Incumbent; Heir apparent: William Hay, Viscount Dupplin
Peerage of Great Britain
Preceded by William Hay	Baron Hay of Pedwardine; 2013–present	Incumbent; Heir apparent: William Hay, Viscount Dupplin
Parliament of the United Kingdom
Preceded by The Lady Saltoun	Elected hereditary peer to the House of Lords under the House of Lords Act 1999; 2015–2026	Position abolished under the House of Lords (Hereditary Peers) Act 2026
Other offices
Preceded by The Lord Judge	Convenor of the Crossbench Peers; 2023–present	Incumbent
