= George Hay, 3rd Earl of Kinnoull =

Scottish peer

The Right Honourable The Earl of Kinnoull
- Coat of arms of the Earls of Kinnoull

Personal details
- Died: c. 1650 Kirkland, Orkney
- Parents: George Hay, 2nd Earl of Kinnoull; Ann Douglas

George Hay, 3rd Earl of Kinnoull (died 1650) was a Scottish peer and military officer. He was an active supporter of King Charles I during the English Civil War.

== Biography ==
He was the eldest son of George Hay, 2nd Earl of Kinnoull and Ann Douglas, daughter of William Douglas, 7th Earl of Morton. His date of birth is not recorded, but his parents married in 1622 and his youngest brother, Peter, was baptized 11 June 1632. He succeeded to the earldom in 1644.

He followed the brilliant strategist James Graham, 1st Marquess of Montrose to the north, and was with him at Crathes Castle in his Aberdeen expedition after the Battle of Tippermuir in 1644. Kinnoull apparently then went to France, on his mother's petition, to be "bred and brocht up as his ain son," by his cousin the Earl of Carlisle. At some point he traveled further north, as a letter from Elizabeth Stuart, Queen of Bohemia, sent from Rhenen dated 14 August [O.S. 4 August] 1649 to Montrose at The Hague, mentions him, "We have nothing to do but to walk and shoot. I am grown a good archer, to shoot with my Lord Kinnoul."

== Return to Scotland ==
Kinnoull likely return to Scotland soon after, as he arrived in Orkney in September with a force of about 100 Danish soldiers and 80 officers, who were going to train the islanders for Montrose. In September 1649, Kinnoull sent an enthusiastic letter to Montrose telling him that he "is gapt after with that expectation that the Jeus look after their Messia."

Kinnoull stayed with his uncle, Robert Douglas, 8th Earl of Morton, who had considerable property in Orkney. On the day after his landing, a Captain Hall arrived with a ship full of arms and ammunition, sent by Archibald Campbell, 9th Earl of Argyll to his own clansmen in the Highlands.

Historian Samuel Rawson Gardiner writes:

In October, indeed, David Leslie hurried northwards, but the Committee of Estates had no navy, and being unable to cross the Pentland Firth, Leslie contented himself with leaving a few garrisons behind him, and retired into winter quarters in the south. Beyond the reach of attack by an enemy without a fleet, the Orkneys formed an impregnable fortress for the Royalists, within reach of that Celtic part of Scotland where Montrose's earlier victories had been won.

Unluckily for Montrose, on 12 November 1649, the Earl of Morton died "of a displeasure conceived at his nephew George, Earl of Kinnoull," writes Sir James Balfour. Balfour wrote that Morton felt slighted because commissions had been conferred on his nephew that he thought he himself deserved, although other historians feel they may have been on good terms. Gardiner writes that Kinnoull was "well received by his uncle, the Earl of Morton, who encouraged the islanders to enlist in the Royal cause." In his letter to Montrose, Kinnoull writes that he gave the commissions to his uncle:

"My uncle, my Lord of Morton, was pleased to think he was neglected, in that the commissions for stating the country were not immediately conferred on him by your Lordship. Wherefore, having all assurance of his reality, I waived my own interest so much that I resigned all power of my commissions to him, which he was pleased to accept of before the gentlemen of this country, who were convocated for the receiving of his commands and your Excellencie's."

== Death ==
The earl died shortly after his uncle; although there is no clear date of his death, there are several independent chronicles. Captain John Gwynne wrote, "About two months after the Earle of Kynoole fell sick at Bursay, the Earl of Morton's house, and there died of a pleurisy; whose loss was very much lamented, as he was truly honourable and perfectly loyal." Charles Gordon, 1st Earl of Aboyne, wrote that Kinnoull's death occurred soon after his uncle: "Presentlie thereafter the Earl of Morton dyed, and within a fewe dayes Kinnoul dyed also at Kirkwall in Orkney, unto whom his brother succeeded." Diarist John Lamont of Fife records Kinnoull's death in his journal in March 1650, but it is not clear whether this is the actual date of his death, or the date when Lamont heard of it.

However, though Kinnoull is said to have died shortly after his uncle, the General Assembly of the Church of Scotland believed him to be alive on 21 February 1650, as on that day George, Earl of Kinnoull; Henry Stewart, son to the Laird of Maynes; George Drummond, son to the Laird of Balloch; and Captain Hall were all excommunicated for the invasion of Orkney and for "horrid and perfidious conspiracies against the Solemn League and Covenant."

He died unmarried, and was succeeded in the earldom by his younger brother William.

Peerage of Scotland
Preceded by George Hay	Earl of Kinnoull; 1644–1650	Succeeded by William Hay
