= Thomas Hay, 7th Earl of Kinnoull =

Scottish peer (1660–1719)

The Earl of Kinnoull
- Coat of arms of the Earls of Kinnoull

Shire Commissioner for Perthshire
- In office 1693–1697

Scottish representative peer
- In office 10 November 1710 – 5 January 1715

Personal details
- Born: 1660
- Died: 5 January 1719 (age 58-59) London, United Kingdom
- Party: Conservative
- Spouse: Elizabeth Drummond (m. 1683)
- Children: Lady Margaret Hay; Lady Elizabeth Hay; George Henry Hay, 8th Earl of Kinnoull
- Parents: Peter Hay; Margaret Boyd

Thomas Hay, 7th Earl of Kinnoull (1660 – 5 January 1719), styled as Viscount Dupplin from 1697 to 1709, was a Scottish peer and Conservative politician.

== Biography ==
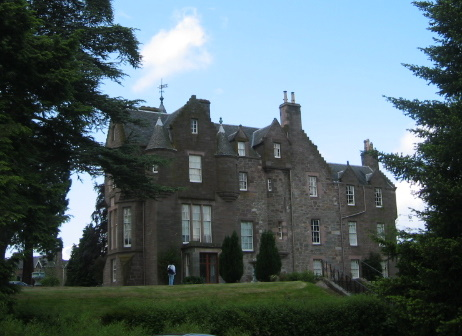
Balhousie Castle

He was a descendant of Peter Hay of Rattray, Perthshire (younger brother of George Hay, 1st Earl of Kinnoull) and Margaret Boyd. Thomas Hay was a Tory member of the Scottish parliament for Perthshire between 1693 and 1697. He was created Viscount Dupplin on 31 December 1697. He resided at the family seat of Balhousie Castle.

William Hay, 6th Earl of Kinnoull, a supporter of King James II and VII, resigned his titles after the king's abdication. William was given a life peerage by Queen Anne and upon his death on 10 May 1709, the titles passed to Thomas.

He was a commissioner for the Union of English and Scottish Parliaments in 1707. He sat in the First Parliament of Great Britain as one of 16 representative peers between 1710 and 1714.

The earl and his heir were briefly imprisoned in Edinburgh Castle on suspicion of Jacobite sympathies during the 1715 uprising.

== Marriage and issue ==
He married Elizabeth, daughter of William Drummond, 1st Viscount Strathallan, on 20 December 1683. They had five children:

1. Lady Margaret Hay (30 September 1686 – 26 April 1707), married John Erskine, 6th Earl of Mar on 6 April 1703
2. Lady Elizabeth Hay (d. 1723), married James Ogilvy, 5th Earl of Findlater
3. George Henry Hay (23 June 1689 – 28 July 1758), married Lady Abigail Harley, daughter of Robert Harley, 1st Earl of Oxford and Earl Mortimer.
4. William Hay, died before 1711
5. John Hay of Cromlix (1691–1740) created the Earl of Inverness, married Marjorie Murray, sister to William Murray, 1st Earl of Mansfield.

Political offices
Parliament of Scotland
Preceded by	Member of Parliament for Perthshire; 1693–1697	Succeeded by
Peerage of Scotland
Preceded by William Hay	Earl of Kinnoull; 1709–1718	Succeeded by George Hay
