= William Hay, 4th Earl of Kinnoull =

Scottish peer and soldier

The Right Honourable The Earl of Kinnoull
- Coat of arms of the Earls of Kinnoull

Personal details
- Died: 28 March 1677
- Spouses: Lady Mary Brudenell (died 1665); Lady Catherine Cecil
- Children: George Hay, 5th Earl of Kinnoull; William Hay, 6th Earl of Kinnoull
- Parents: George Hay, 2nd Earl of Kinnoull; Ann Douglas

William Hay, 4th Earl of Kinnoull (died 28 March 1677) was a Scottish peer and soldier, loyal to King Charles I. He escaped twice from Edinburgh Castle.

== Biography ==
He was the second son of George Hay, 2nd Earl of Kinnoull and Ann Douglas, daughter of William Douglas, 7th Earl of Morton. His date of birth is not recorded, but his parents married in 1622 and his youngest brother, Peter, was baptized 11 June 1632. His older brother, George, became the third earl in 1644 after the death of their father.

Like his brother, William was a supporter of Charles I and joined forces with James Graham, 1st Marquess of Montrose. Montrose's nephew, Archibald Napier, 2nd Lord Napier, wrote his uncle from Brussels, 14 June 1648, "At my parting from France there went in my company above fifty men that did belong to my Lord Montrose; amongst which was Monsieur Hay, Kinnoull's brother, and severall others of good quality."

He inherited the earldom after his older brother died without issue in late 1649 or early 1650. The third earl's date of death is uncertain, but writings referring to the Earl of Kinnoull in early 1650 are believed to be about William. He is mentioned in March 1650 as having arrived in Orkney with a fresh supply of continental troops for the Royalist cause.

Charles Gordon, 1st Earl of Aboyne writes that Kinnoull accompanied Montrose after his defeat at the Battle of Carbisdale in April 1650, when he was ultimately captured. Gordon writes that Kinnoull "being faint for lack of meat, and not able to go any further, was left there among the mountains, where it was supposed he perished."

Kinnoull in fact escaped death and continued to fight Montrose's cause after the latter's execution in May 1650. In December 1653, he was captured near Glamis and taken prisoner in Edinburgh Castle. Along with some others, the earl succeeded in escaping in May 1654.

He joined forces with James Graham, 2nd Marquess of Montrose, being with him in battle at the Wood of Methven in June 1654. On 23 November, Kinnoull was again captured and taken prisoner in Edinburgh Castle, from which he again escaped.

Upon the death of his cousin James Hay, 2nd Earl of Carlisle in 1660, Kinnoull succeeded him in the proprietorship of Barbados, but sold it to the Crown in 1661 for a pension.

He married first Lady Mary Brudenell, daughter of Robert Brudenell, 2nd Earl of Cardigan. She was born 7 January 1636, in Northampton, and died in 1665. He married secondly, Lady Catherine Cecil, daughter of Charles Cecil, Viscount Cranborne. They had two sons, both of whom succeeded in the earldom:

1. George Hay, 5th Earl of Kinnoull (died 1687)
2. William Hay, 6th Earl of Kinnoull (d. 10 May 1709)

He died 28 March 1677 and was buried in May in Waltham Abbey Church, Essex.

== Bibliography ==
- Paul, James Balfour (1908). The Scots Peerage : founded on Wood's edition of Sir Robert Douglas's Peerage of Scotland; containing an historical and enealogical account of the nobility of that kingdom. Vol. 5. Edinburgh: David Douglas.

Peerage of Scotland
Preceded by George Hay	Earl of Kinnoull; 1650– 1677	Succeeded by George Hay
