= Rosa Judge =

Rosa Judge MQR (née Micallef; 1919 – 6 September 2017) was a Maltese musician. She was educated at St Catherine's School in Sliema, Malta.

== Career ==
In 1934 she was awarded the Gold Medal from the Associated Board of the Royal Schools of Music for the highest distinction marks in the final grade. She was awarded an exhibition to the Royal Academy of Music, London. She was an Associate of Royal Academy of Music and an Honorary Member of the Royal College of Music.

== Awards ==
In 1982 she was created "Cavaliere del Umanita" from the International Society of Cavalleria Cristiana and in 1993 she was invested a Marchesa of the Holy Roman Empire. In 1996 the Republic of France named her a Chevalier dans L'Ordre des Arts et des Lettres. In 1996 she was named as a Dame of the Military Hospitaller of Jerusalem. In 2011 she was awarded the Midalja għall-Qadi tar-Repubblika (Medal for Service to the Republic).

== Personal life ==
Judge was born in Sliema, Malta, the eldest daughter of Anthony Micallef and Olga (née Bartolo). As of 2008 she resided in Malta.

In 1938 she married Raymond Judge. They had two children: Igor Judge, Baron Judge (b. 1941), Privy Counsellor; Lord Chief Justice of England and Wales; and Tanya Theresa Judge (b. 1946); has issue from first marriage, currently married to Sir Ian Patrick Lowson, 2nd Bt, and has issue
