= William Hay, 6th Earl of Kinnoull =

Scottish peer

The Earl of Kinnoull
- Coat of arms of the Earls of Kinnoull

Personal details
- Died: 10 May 1709
- Parents: William Hay, 4th Earl of Kinnoull; Lady Catherine Cecil

William Thomas Hay, 6th Earl of Kinnoull (died 10 May 1709) was a Scottish peer. His titles were Earl of Kinnoull, Viscount Dupplin and Lord Hay of Kinfauns in the Peerage of Scotland.

== Biography ==
He was the second son of the William Hay, 4th Earl of Kinnoull and his second wife, Catherine, eldest daughter and heir of Charles Cecil, Viscount Cranborne, son of William Cecil, 2nd Earl of Salisbury.

He entered Scottish College, Douai on 3 June 1685 and inherited the earldom in 1687 after the death of his older brother, George Hay. The earl was a supporter of King James II and VII, and followed him to exile in Saint-Germain-en-Laye. He resigned his titles but they were restored on 29 February 1704, by Queen Anne, with remainder to his cousin, Viscount Dupplin.

Upon his death on 10 May 1709, unmarried, the titles passed to his cousin Thomas Hay, 7th Earl of Kinnoull.

Peerage of Scotland
Preceded by George Hay	Earl of Kinnoull; 1687–1709	Succeeded by Thomas Hay
