= George Hays =

George Hays may refer to:

- George P. Hays (college president) (1838–1897), president of Washington & Jefferson College
- George Washington Hays (1863–1927), Governor of the U.S. state of Arkansas
- George Price Hays (1892–1978), United States Army general
- George Hays (American football) (1924–2007), former defensive end in the National Football League
- George B. Hays, director of the New York bank Consolidated National Bank in 1902

== See also ==
- George Hayes (disambiguation)
- George Hay (disambiguation)
- Hays (surname)
