= Enid Hamilton-Fellows =

English adventurer and photographer (1904–1985)

Claude Kinnoull, Countess of Kinnoull Enid Hamilton-Fellows
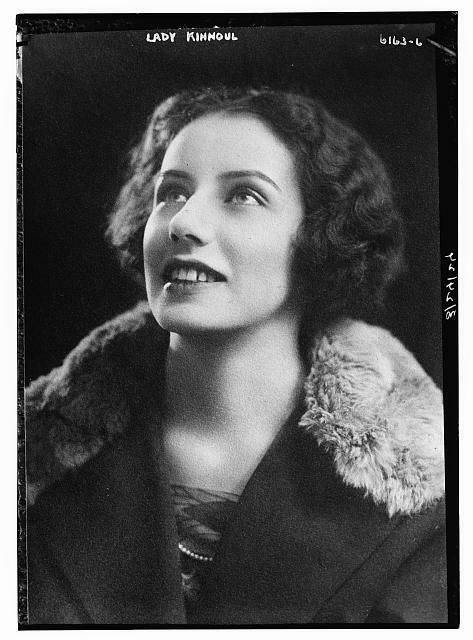

Personal details
- Born: 26 October 1904 St George Hanover Square, London, England
- Died: 21 July 1985 (aged 80) Monterey Peninsula, California, U.S.
- Spouse: George Hay, 14th Earl of Kinnoull (m. 1923; div. 1927)
- Holy Orders and Awards: Grand Dame d'Honneur, Order of the Holy Sepulchre; Officer, Order of Leopold II; Chevalier of the Legion of Honour; Order of Isabella the Catholic

Military service
- Branch/service: British Secret Services; Deuxième Bureau; Spanish Nationalists
- Battles/wars: Spanish Civil War; World War II

Enid Margaret Hamlyn Hamilton-Fellows, Claude Kinnoull, Countess of Kinnoull (1904–1985) was an English philanthropist, converted Catholic nun, photojournalist and artist. Born in London into a prominent and wealthy family, she married George Hay, 14th Earl of Kinnoull in 1923. She led an adventurous life in high society, racing cars and flying airplanes, before Hay's bankruptcy led her to leave him in 1925. After the divorce became official in 1927, Hamilton-Fellows left England and settled in Paris, where she converted to Catholicism. She travelled as a missionary through Africa in the early 1930s.

After the outbreak of the Spanish Civil War, Hamilton-Fellows travelled to Spain and worked under the pseudonym Claudek as a photographer for the Nationalists, capturing over 800 photographs of the war and its aftermath. In a return to Paris, she worked briefly with the British Secret Services and the Deuxième Bureau to resist the Nazi invasion of France and expose Communist agents, but was soon forced to flee to the United States. She settled in Carmel, California, where she was friends with Langston Hughes, Una Jeffers, Robinson Jeffers and other Californian social elites.

In Carmel, Hamilton-Fellows was a cofounder of the Monterey Institute of Foreign Studies. She was named a Grand Dame d'Honneur of the Order of the Holy Sepulchre, an officer of the Order of Leopold II, a Chevalier of the Legion of Honour and a member of the Order of Isabella the Catholic, among others.

== Early life ==
Hamilton-Fellows was born in London, in 1904. She was a member of a prominent family who owned the Imperial Tobacco Company, the daughter of Margaret Wills Hamilton-Fellowes and Ernest Gadesden Fellows. She was the granddaughter of Sir Frederick Wills, 1st Baronet. Her grandfather was the first director of Imperial Tobacco, and had amassed enormous wealth during his life, passing the fortune down to her mother.

Her mother's famous friends gathered often at the family home and Hamilton-Fellows learned much from them, including Naomi Royde-Smith, who taught Hamilton-Fellows many lessons in writing and painting.

== Marriage to George Hay, the Earl of Kinnoull (1923–1927) ==
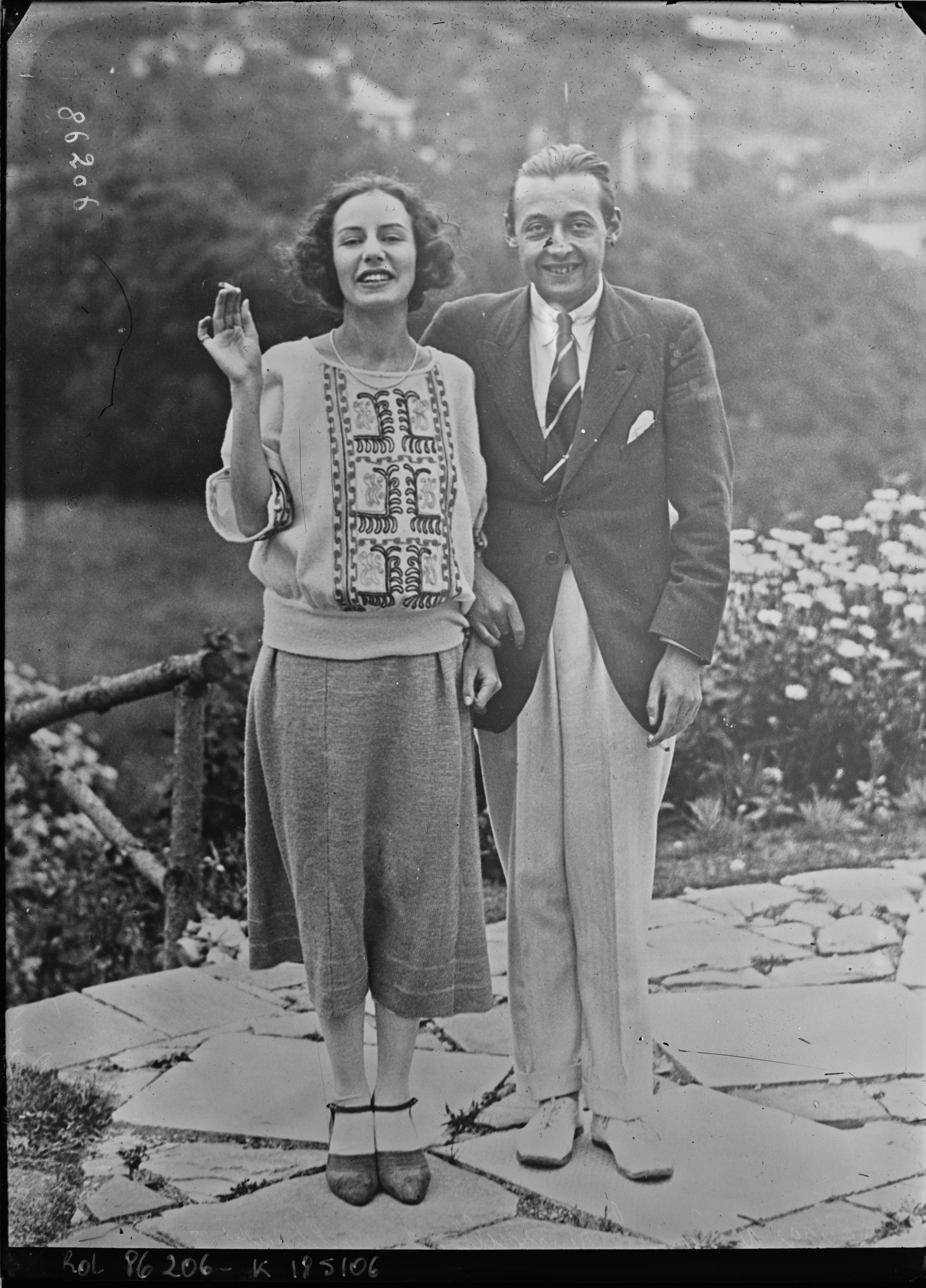
The Earl and Countess of Kinnoull at their marriage ceremony in 1923.

She obtained the title of the Countess of Kinnoull in the Scottish courts and the Scottish heraldry when she and George Hay were married on 15 December 1923. Her married name became Enid Margaret Hamlyn Hay-Drummond. When they were first married, the British called her "the baby countess". She was 18 and he was 21 – not far apart in age, but she was younger than the previously deceased Countess, and her peeresses, which earned her the name. The couple had shared interests in sports, fast cars, flying airplanes, dancing and golfing. They were able to do much of these activities on the grounds of Dupplin Castle, which they had access through the Earl's family.

She became a notable figure in high society during her early married life. She gained attention in the press for her adventurous character and diverse abilities, which were unusual for women of her time. She learned to fly airplanes, drive and repair automobiles, and participated in motor racing, often even receiving fines for speeding outside of the racecourse. One account has her flying her own aircraft to see the judge after such a speeding infraction. In addition to her technical skills, she cultivated artistic interests, including painting and writing. Her family's tobacco wealth facilitated some of these pursuits, but her willingness to take risks and develop skills in traditionally male domains contributed to her reputation as both an adventurer and an artist.

Hamilton-Fellows took flying lessons at the De Havilland School of Flying, a program run by De Havilland at the original De Havilland Aerodrome in Hendon (the Aerodrome later moved to Hatfield in 1930).

They had a son, Henry George Adam Hay, the Viscount Dupplin, born on 23 November 1924, but he died at only four months old, on 7 March 1925. Their marriage soon faced difficulties, in part due to financial pressures on the Kinnoull family estate, Balhousie Castle in Perthshire. The estate, heavily encumbered by debt, was eventually sold and the furnishings were auctioned to meet creditors' demands. In the several years of their marriage, the Earl's gambling addiction and poor investments led her to enter into a trial separation.

Later in 1925, "Lady Enid" returned to live with her mother, Margaret Hamilton-Fellowes at Tangley Park.

The Earl, meanwhile, was declared bankrupt, which prevented him from taking his seat in the House of Lords. His reputation for financial mismanagement and earlier involvement in an attempted marriage to the wealthy South African widow, Esther Trewartha Surle, had already drawn public attention. Despite their initial public image as a fashionable young couple, the marriage between the Earl and Lady Enid ultimately broke down and she pursued an independent life with her inheritance.

In 1926, the reporter Sandown Strachey wrote:

"Kinnoull's a good chap, but foolish when it comes to money. He can't hold on to the stuff, none of the Kinnoulls ever could. It wasn't altogether his fault that he lost Balhousie House, the place was heavily encumbered when it came to him. It's true he left the Countess and came to London, but he, too, had no place to go when the roof was sold over their heads."

In 1927, she officially filed for a divorce. She managed to leave the marriage with the entire sum of her mother's estate – between £5 million and $10 million – in her own hands. Although some in society expected her to use her inheritance to restore the Kinnoull estate and reconcile with her husband, she declined to do so and announced plans to live abroad. She expressed little interest in retaining her aristocratic title and considered settling either in continental Europe or the United States. She told the press that she didn't care for her title, calling it "empty and uninteresting," and later told reporters: "I don't care a rap for my title–and I'm NOT going to stay in England!" (The newspaper where this quote originates used all-caps on the word "not".)

Less than 24 hours after the divorce was finalized, the Earl announced his engagement to Mary Meyrick, the daughter of Kate Meyrick, the woman that the press called the "Night Club Queen" of the London speakeasy.

Despite her desire to renounce the title, Hamilton-Fellows was nevertheless retained her title by the Peerage of Scotland, remaining the Countess of Kinnoull, and for decades afterwards there were two women who simultaneously held the title.

== Conversion to Catholicism and Catholic activities (1927–1936) ==
After leaving Britain in 1927, the Countess settled in Paris, choosing to live near the Church of Saint-Augustin. The area was a prosperous and solidly bourgeois neighborhood, and here she managed a comfortable, elite Parisian lifestyle. Around this time, she began to attend Parisian café gatherings, spaces where intellectual and political discussions were common. It was in this environment that she came into contact with Léon de Poncins, a French writer noted for his strong ideological positions. Poncins was recognized for his militant anti-communism, as well as for espousing antisemitic views and hostility toward a range of political and religious currents.

Around this time, she met Vincent de Moor, a Belgian named Robert Ghislain de Moor, known in the Church as Vincent de Moor. At the time of their meeting, the countess was not Catholic. She had been raised in a Protestant denomination related to English Congregationalism, itself a secessionist current from the Anglican Church. This background, more closely linked to Puritan traditions, was relatively uncommon among the English aristocracy.

Vincent de Moor was a Catholic priest attached to the Church of Saint-Augustin, but he had more of a militant past. De Moor had served as a parish priest but was also known for his activities during the First World War, when he acted as a spy within Catholic resistance networks operating across Belgium, northern France and England. In addition to his own work, he was involved in the training of others engaged in clandestine operations.

In Paris, she became increasingly drawn to Catholicism, influenced by the religious atmosphere she encountered and by Vincent de Moor himself. She converted to Catholicism in 1928, with de Moor serving as her godfather.

Hamilton-Fellows completed her conversion in 1928. During her Catholic confirmation, she took the Catholic name "Claude Kinnoull", after the Catholic saint Claude La Colombière. The countess became a principal supporter and collaborator in de Moor's missionary initiatives, providing financial backing for his projects.

This spiritual connection deepened into a close personal association that became the subject of speculation, with some contemporary references presenting them as "uncle and niece" or "godfather and goddaughter" to describe the unusual nature of their relationship. By 1929, Vincent de Moor was accompanying her on religious travels, including audiences at the Vatican and a pilgrimage to Jerusalem, where she spent time with a Catholic congregation. These experiences consolidated both her new religious identity and her enduring partnership with de Moor, which later extended into their joint ventures abroad.

=== Mission of the Croisière Bleue (1931–1932) ===
Approximate route of the Croisière bleue

The two of them then met with Pope Pius XI, who advised them to travel on a mission through Africa.

On Easter Day 1931, they departed from Marseille on an expedition to Africa, traveling in a Citroën C6 nicknamed Croisière Bleue (a pun, combining "Blue Cross" with "Blue Cruise") in honor of the Virgin Mary. Their route extended through Egypt, Sudan, the Belgian Congo, Rhodesia, Tanganyika, Burundi, Rwanda, French Equatorial Africa, Cameroon, French Sudan and across the Sahara to Algeria.

Simultaneously to their mission, another mission, not related to the Church, had embarked to Asia, going by the name of La Croisére Jaune.

The journey, completed on 24 January 1932, covered 37,526 kilometers, then considered a world record for distance travelled by automobile. Their vehicle was specially equipped with six low-pressure tires, a six-cylinder engine, and additional tanks carrying 300 litres of fuel and 100 litres of water. The expedition had a missionary character, with visits to 126 centres and the establishment of six new missions. De Moor also produced a feature-length film of the journey, titled Le Croisière bleue.

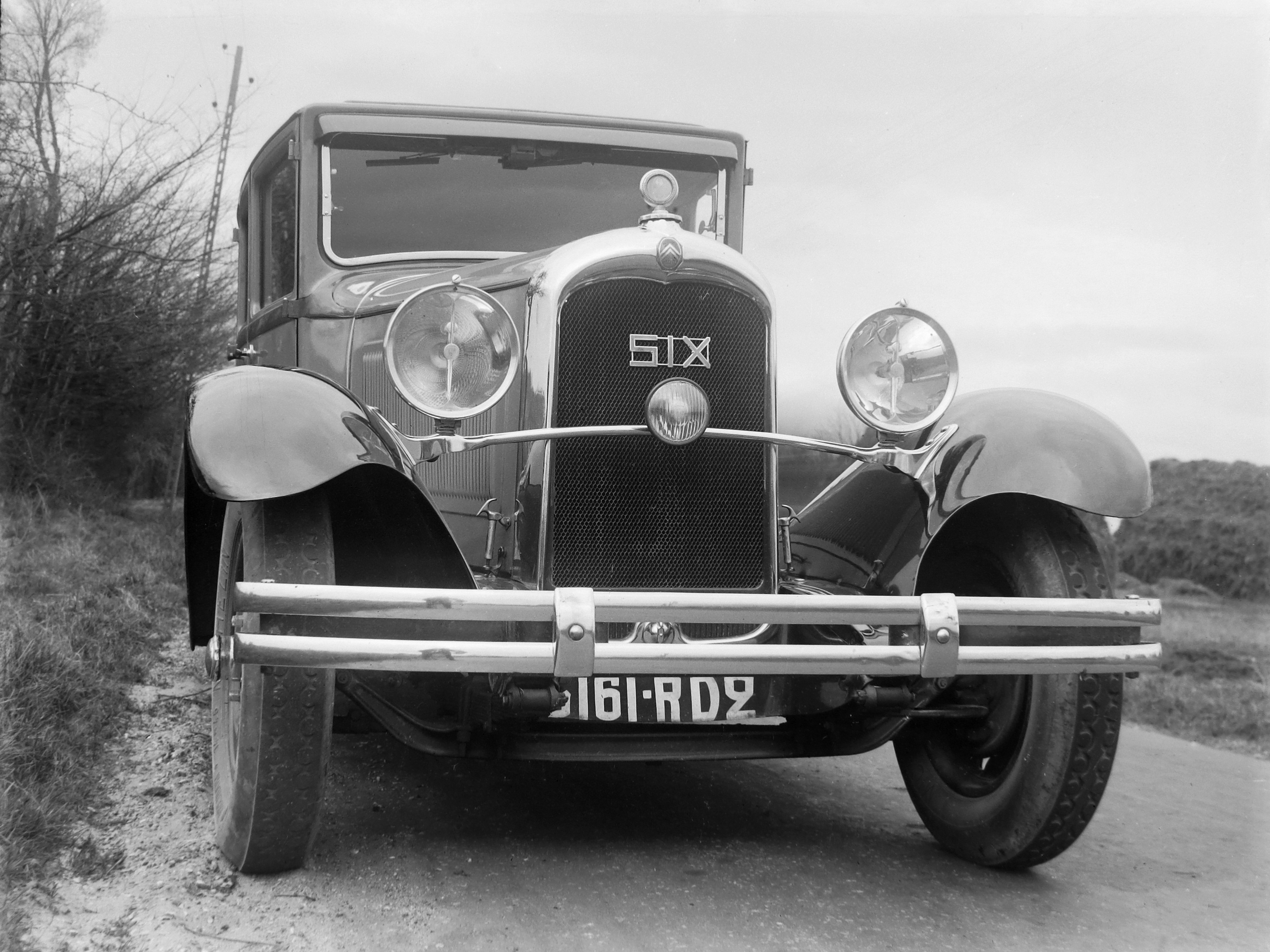
Citroën C6, similar to the one the two missionaries took through the length of Africa between 1931 and 1932.

Due to the technical knowledge she had acquired years earlier, she served as the primary driver of the vehicle, handled mechanical repairs and ensured the journey could continue despite the challenges of terrain and climate. At the time, her capacity to manage such a technically demanding role was considered exceptional, particularly for a woman of her social background.

The stated objective of the Croisière Bleue was to visit Catholic missions scattered across the continent. At each stop, the travelers provided assistance by transporting missionaries, facilitating transfers between posts and delivering supplies, food, medicine and religious materials, especially Bibles and copies of the Catechism of the Catholic Church. In total, they visited over a hundred mission centres and supported the establishment of new ones. The mission-oriented nature of the expedition underscored the deepening of the countess's commitment to Catholicism, linking her more closely to networks of European clergy and religious workers stationed in Africa.

In 1933, Vincent de Moor was appointed head of the International Bureau of Missionary Propaganda for Cinema, a position made possible through the continued financial and personal support of the Countess of Kinnoull.

After completing the African mission, Hamilton-Fellows returned to Paris. There, she joined the Third Order of Our Lady of Mount Carmel and established a hospice for terminally ill women on Rue de la Bienfaisance. She also frequented the Café Le Select, a meeting place for writers and intellectuals, where she often entertained her close friend Léon de Poncins. During this period, she also formed a friendship with the Basque painter Ignacio Zuloaga, who offered her painting instructions in his Montparnasse studio. Later, she continued her studies on painting with Zuloaga in Spain.

== Press photographer during the Spanish Civil War ==
With the outbreak of the Spanish Civil War in 1936, Vincent de Moor traveled to Spain, in support of the Francoist side.

On 24 August 1936, Hamilton-Fellows prepared to travel to Spain, informing acquaintances of her plans in correspondences. She travelled to Spain, accompanying Vincent de Moor. She appeared on a list of accredited foreign journalists compiled by Gonzalo de Aguilera, press officer for General Emilio Mola and Francisco Franco. She was listed as representing the Catholic press, with authorization to operate a vehicle registered under license plate 3348-X1. The names of Vincent de Moor and Léon de Poncins also appear on the same list.

She spent approximately the next six months with Vincent de Moor in various war zones, during which she worked under the pseudonym "Claudek" as a photographer. The photographs later published under this name, including images of the Claretian martyrs of Barbastro, were eventually attributed to her.

She photographed the conflict officially for the Catholic Herald in Britain and for the French daily newspaper La Croix. Her presence alongside Francoist forces was noted in political discussions abroad; in December 1936, French deputy Édouard Frédéric-Dupont referred in the Chamber of Deputies to a photograph taken during the siege of the Alcázar of Toledo, which he attributed to "an English photographer" and which showed inscriptions reportedly written in blood on the wall of a Marist convent, those words stating: "This is how the Cheka kills".

During 1937, she travelled to various fronts, recording the effects of the conflict. After the bombardment of Durango on 31 March, she photographed damage to a Jesuit chapel. Although she attributed the destruction in her published account to Republican forces, her captions also acknowledged it as an instance of damage caused by Nationalist air raids, which she described as "rare". In April 1937, she visited Eibar shortly after the bombing of the town, photographing ruined streets and damaged buildings while reporting that fires were still burning. Her articles described destruction by Republican and anarchist groups, though her photographs have been recently interpreted by historians as broader evidence of the impact of aerial bombardments by Nationalist forces on civilian areas.

In total, Hamilton-Fellows captured over 800 photographs during the course of the war. Most of her photographs have been archived in the Museum of the Claretians.

Following the conflict, the countess returned briefly to Paris, where she connected with the British Secret Services and the Deuxième Bureau, attempting to resist the Nazi invasion of France and also expose Communist agents operating in France. However, nearly immediately, she was placed on a list of highly valued targets by the Germans and she used her connections to obtain an asylum visa to the United States. However, she continued to financially support the French Resistance from exile.

== Move to California ==
In 1940, Hamilton-Fellows moved to the town of Carmel, California.

In 1948, she purchased a large home, today known as The Hess Home, on the hilltop corner of Torres Street and 11th Avenue. This was a Spanish eclectic style stucco house that was built in 1925 for Colonel Henry L. Watson. She resided there for the remainder of her life.

Throughout the years, she maintained close contact with Vincent de Moor, who after the war was again engaged in intelligence activities focused on German operations along the French coast. In California, she arranged a base of support for him in Carmel, which he used to travel between Europe and the United States. Vincent de Moor died in New York in 1961, at the age of 73.

In addition to her philanthropic endeavours while living in California, she became known locally as a prolific painter, photographer and sculptor. Her primary works were paintings in oil, gold leaf and enamel. But she also worked in the nascent field of art in plastics, experimenting also with combining plastics with traditional sculpture. She often showed her artworks in local galleries in Carmel and in Monterey, as well as in Santa Clara, Santa Cruz and San Francisco.

In 1955, she became involved with Gaspard Weiss, Remsen Bird, Dwight Morrow Jr., Noël Sullivan, and others in establishing the Monterey Institute of Foreign Studies (MIFS). She served on the Board of Trustees for the Institute and was involved in financially supporting the institute until she died. In the 1960s, she established a scholarship at the institute for graduating high school students to attend MIFS called the Countess of Kinnoull Scholarship.

In 1956, her gallery exhibit The Mysteries of the Rosary was shown at the Legion of Honor Museum in San Francisco, and later was shown at the De Saisset Gallery at the Santa Clara University.

In 1960, she donated her entire 200-acre estate to the Carmel chapter of the Society for the Prevention of Cruelty to Animals (SPCA) so that their animals, and especially their dogs, would have a place of security and would not be disturbed by their neighbors. Her own dog at the time was named Reme, but she had earlier owned a poodle named Ali Baba.

== Written works ==
- Come Home Traveller, written under the name Claude Kinnoull, was published by John Miles Ltd.
