= Anne Douglas, Countess of Morton =

English noblewoman (1610–1654)

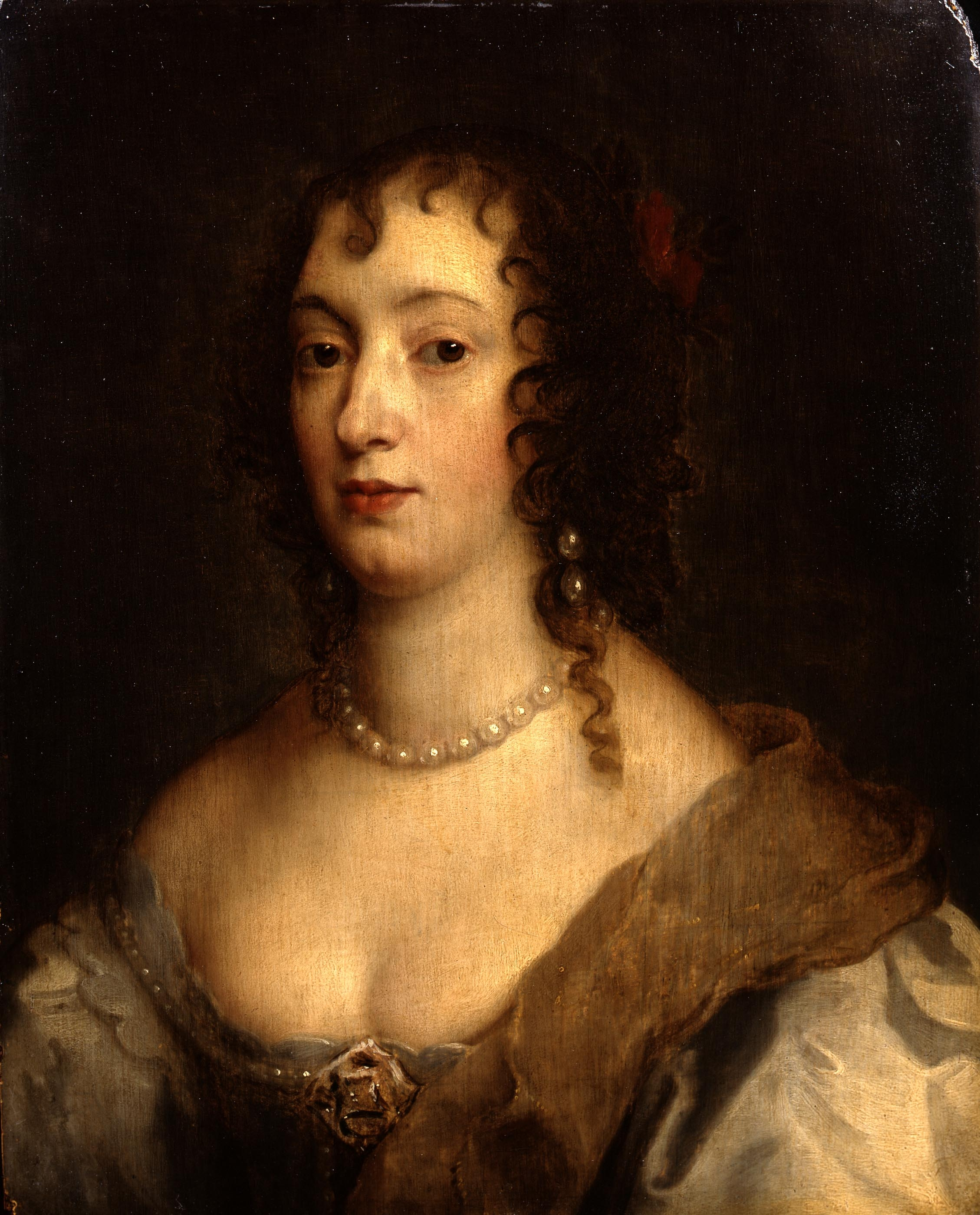
Portrait of Anne, Countess of Morton, by Theodore Russel, c. 1640s

Anne Douglas, Countess of Morton (c. 1610 – 15 December 1654), born Anne Villiers, was an English noblewoman, famed for her beauty, bravery and loyalty to the throne. The first half of the 17th-century closet drama Cicilia and Clorinda was dedicated to her.

== Origins ==
Anne was the daughter of Sir Edward Villiers (c. 1585 – 7 September 1626) and his wife, Barbara St. John, a daughter of Sir John St. John. She was a half-niece of the Duke of Buckingham, who was one of her father's younger half-brothers. Anne Villiers's nieces included Elizabeth Villiers, mistress to William III, and Barbara Villiers, who was the mistress of Charles II and would be made Duchess of Cleveland in her own right.

== Marriage and family ==
In April 1627, Anne Villiers married Robert Douglas, Lord Dalkeith, later Earl of Morton. The Duke of Buckingham promised to pay his father, William Douglas, 7th Earl of Morton, £5,000 and settle a landed income of £3,000 yearly on Lord Dalkeith of which £1,000 would be Anne's jointure and £1,000 used for the couple's expenses.

Anne Douglas, Countess of Morton and the Earl of Morton had at least three children who lived to adulthood:

1. William Douglas, 9th Earl of Morton (died 1681), married Lady Grizel Middleton, daughter of the 1st Earl of Middleton and had issue;
2. Lady Anne Douglas, married in 1654 to William Keith, 6th Earl Marischal (after 1927 nomenclature changed to identify him as the 7th Earl Marischal) and had issue;
3. Lady Mary Douglas, married on 24 July 1662 to Sir Donald Macdonald, 10th Laird of Sleat, 3rd Baronet and had issue.

== Royalist heroine ==
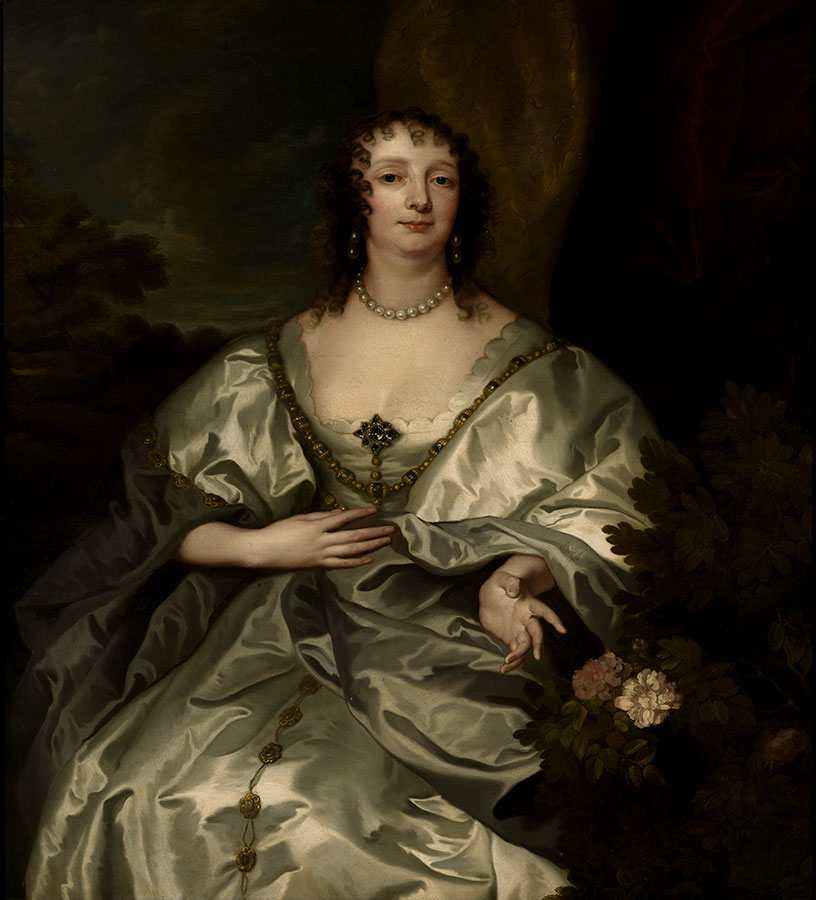
Anne Villiers, Lady Dalkeith, by Anthony van Dyck

Lady Dalkeith, as she was styled at the time, was a godmother of Princess Henrietta. During the Civil War, the infant princess, less than one-month-old, was left in Lady Dalkeith's care. After being besieged in Exeter by Parliamentary forces in April 1646, she was forced to expend her own funds to care for the princess. She refused to take the child to St James's Palace, endeavouring instead to convey her to France to be united with her mother, Queen Henrietta Maria. She disguised herself and the princess as peasants and fled to Dover and then France. Apparently, during the journey, the princess nearly revealed their identity by innocently informing the townspeople that she was not accustomed to dressing in such a shabby fashion. Nevertheless, they arrived safely. Lady Dalkeith's actions were well-received and highly praised upon her arrival. Shortly after, her father-in-law died, making her Countess of Morton.

Despite efforts of conversion to Catholicism by the princess's mother and the child herself, Lady Morton remained a staunch Protestant throughout her time as Princess Henrietta's governess. Lady Morton lived in France as the princess's governess until 1651, when her husband, the Earl, died. She herself died in Scotland on 15 December 1654, of a sudden bout of fever.

== Anne and Lord Clarendon ==
For many years an exceptionally close friendship existed between Lady Morton and Edward Hyde, 1st Earl of Clarendon, a cousin by marriage, whose letters to her sometimes suggest feelings warmer than friendship. Eventually they quarrelled, in slightly obscure circumstances, when she accused him of interfering with her marriage plans for her daughter Anne, and she broke off friendly relations, much to Clarendon's distress. A long projected second marriage between Lady Morton and John Berkeley, 1st Baron Berkeley of Stratton, never took place, possibly due to opposition from Clarendon, who had quarrelled with Berkeley. Clarendon's regard for Anne's memory is thought to have been one of the reasons for his hatred of her niece Barbara Villiers, mistress of Charles II: he thought it intolerable that so close a relative of his old friend should disgrace her family in this fashion. This eventually contributed to his downfall, since Barbara returned his hatred, and worked constantly to destroy him.
