= Igor Judge, Baron Judge =

English judge (1941–2023)

The Right Honourable The Lord Judge PC KC
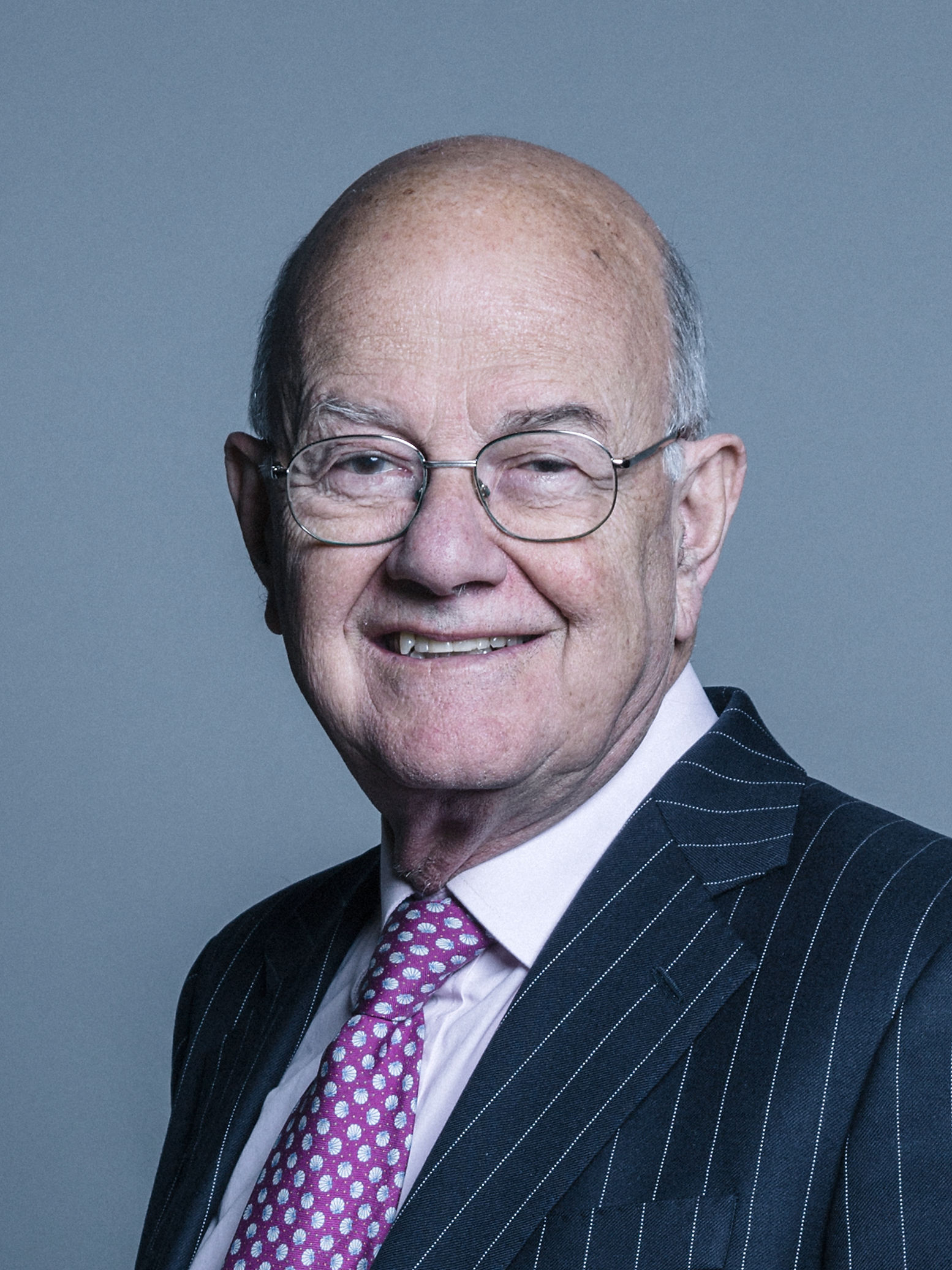
- Judge in 2018

Member of the House of Lords
- Lord Temporal
- Life peerage 1 October 2008 – 7 November 2023

Convenor of the Crossbench Peers
- In office 1 October 2019 – 27 April 2023
- Preceded by: The Lord Hope of Craighead
- Succeeded by: The Earl of Kinnoull

Lord Chief Justice of England and Wales
- In office 1 October 2008 – 30 September 2013
- Nominated by: Jack Straw
- Appointed by: Elizabeth II
- Preceded by: The Lord Phillips of Worth Matravers
- Succeeded by: The Lord Thomas of Cwmgiedd

President of the Queen's Bench Division
- In office 3 October 2005 – 1 October 2008
- Deputy: Sir Anthony May
- Preceded by: The Lord Woolf (as Lord Chief Justice)
- Succeeded by: Sir Anthony May

Deputy Chief Justice of England and Wales
- In office 2003–2005
- Lord Chief Justice: The Lord Woolf
- Preceded by: Sir Tasker Watkins^{[a]}
- Succeeded by: None^{[a]}

Personal details
- Born: Igor Judge; 19 May 1941 Valletta, British Malta
- Died: 7 November 2023 (aged 82) London, England
- Party: Crossbencher
- Parent: Rosa Judge (mother)
- Education: Magdalene College, Cambridge
- Occupation: Barrister; jurist; judge; life peer; professor of law
- a. Office vacant from 1993 to 2003. Non-statutory position.

Igor Judge, Baron Judge (19 May 1941 – 7 November 2023), was an English judge who served as Lord Chief Justice of England and Wales, the head of the judiciary, from 2008 to 2013. He was previously President of the Queen's Bench Division, at the time a newly created post assuming responsibilities transferred from the office of lord chief justice. From 2019 to 2023, he served as Convenor of the Crossbench Peers in the House of Lords.

== Early life and education ==
Judge was born in Malta on 19 May 1941, to Raymond and Rosa Judge (née Micallef). Judge was educated at St. Edward's College, Malta, from 1947 to 1954 and The Oratory School in Woodcote in Oxfordshire from 1954 to 1959, where he was Captain of School and Captain of Cricket. He was awarded an Open Exhibition to study History and Law at Magdalene College, Cambridge, in 1959, and he graduated BA in 1962.

== Legal career ==
Judge was called to the bar (Middle Temple) in 1963, became a Recorder in 1976 and Queen's Counsel in 1979. From 1980 to 1986, he served on the Professional Conduct Committee of the Bar Council. In 1987, he was elected Leader of the Midland Circuit. On 10 October 1988, Judge was appointed a Justice of the High Court, assigned to the Queen's Bench Division, and awarded the customary knighthood. He was appointed a Lord Justice of Appeal, a judge of the Court of Appeal, on 4 June 1996, becoming a privy counsellor.

Judge was the Senior Presiding Judge from 1998 to 2003, when he became Deputy Chief Justice. He was not appointed Lord Chief Justice following the retirement of Lord Woolf in 2005 despite having served as his deputy; Lord Phillips of Worth Matravers, then Master of the Rolls, was appointed instead.

On 3 October 2005, he was appointed the first President of the Queen's Bench Division, when that post was split from that of Lord Chief Justice. In addition to that role, Judge was appointed Head of Criminal Justice in January 2007.

Judge replaced Lord Phillips as Lord Chief Justice on 1 October 2008. The same day, he was created a life peer as Baron Judge, of Draycote in the County of Warwickshire, and he was introduced to the House of Lords five days later, where he sat as a crossbencher.

In 2007 Lord Judge was awarded an honorary doctorate from Nottingham Trent University, and in 2010 was made an Honorary Fellow of Aberystwyth University as well as Kingston University. On 20 June 2012 he received an honorary doctorate from Cambridge.

Judge retired as Lord Chief Justice at the end of September 2013. He was Treasurer of the Middle Temple for the year 2014.

From November 2013 until his death in November 2023, Judge served as a distinguished visitor to The Dickson Poon School of Law at King's College London.

Contrary to popular belief, he was never referred to as "Judge Judge" throughout his career. This was despite several media reports listing him by that title, especially when discussing nominative determinism.

== Parliament ==
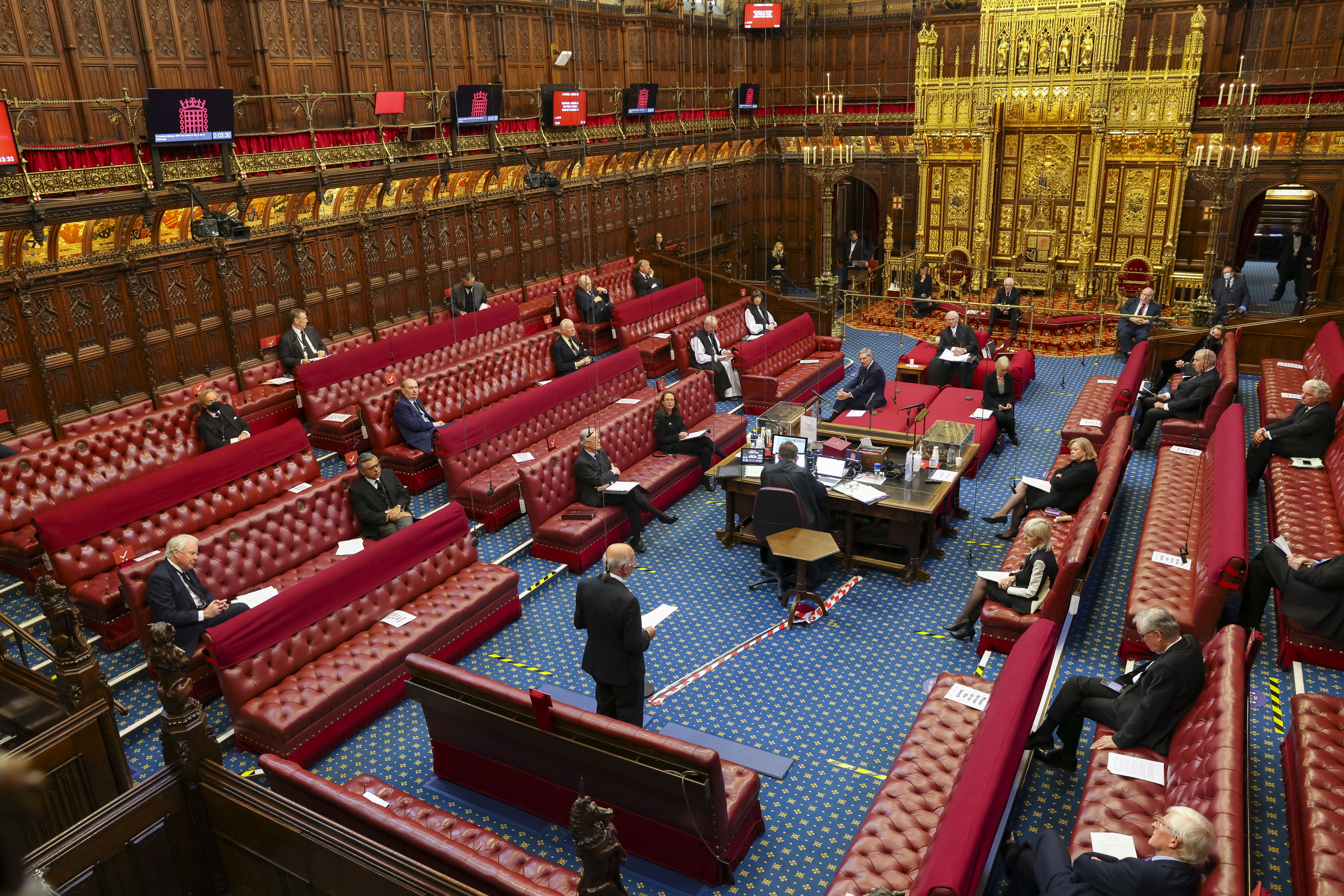
Judge speaks from the crossbenches in 2021.

Judge succeeded Lord Hope of Craighead as Convenor of the Crossbench Peers in 2019.

== Personal life and death ==
Judge had a son and two daughters.

Judge died on 7 November 2023, at the age of 82.

== Arms ==
Coat of arms of Igor Judge, Baron Judge

Crest
A bear sejant erect Gules grasping with both forepaws a sword erect Argent hilt pommel and quillons Or.
Escutcheon
Quarterly Argent and Gules a cross couped nowy round pierced and parted counterchanged and enclosing a roundel Or.
Supporters
On either side a heraldic dolphin Argent finned Or and holding in the beak a scroll Argent tied and sealed Gules.
Motto
Sine Amore Nihil
Badge
Two heraldic dolphins erect and addorsed Argent finned and crowned with an ancient crown Or.

== See also ==
- Nominative determinism

Legal offices
Preceded by The Lord Phillips of Worth Matravers	Lord Chief Justice of England and Wales; 2008–2013	Succeeded by The Lord Thomas of Cwmgiedd
Academic offices
Preceded by The Lord Mackay of Clashfern	Commissary of the University of Cambridge; 2016–2023	Vacant
Other offices
Preceded by The Lord Hope of Craighead	Convenor of the Crossbench Peers; 2019–2023	Succeeded by The Earl of Kinnoull
