= Earl of Kinnoull =

Scottish Peerage title

Earldom of Kinnoull
- The Hay-Drummond coat of arms
- Creation date: 25 May 1633
- Peerage: Peerage of Scotland
- First holder: George Hay, 1st Earl of Kinnoull
- Present holder: Charles Hay, 16th Earl of Kinnoull
- Heir apparent: William Hay, Viscount Dupplin (b. 2011)
- Subsidiary titles: Viscount Dupplin, Lord Hay of Kinfauns, Baron Hay of Pedwardine
- Seat: Dupplin Castle
- Former seat: Balhousie Castle
- Motto: Renovate animos ("Renew your courage")

Earl of Kinnoull (sometimes spelled Earl of Kinnoul) is a title in the Peerage of Scotland. It was created in 1633 for George Hay, 1st Viscount of Dupplin. Other associated titles are: Viscount Dupplin and Lord Hay of Kinfauns (1627) and Baron Hay of Pedwardine (1711). The former two are in the Peerage of Scotland, while the third is in the Peerage of Great Britain. The title of Viscount Dupplin is the courtesy title for the Earl's eldest son and heir.

== History ==
The Hay clan descends from Norman-born knight Guillaume de la Haye, who was pincerna (cup bearer or butler) to Malcolm IV and William the Lion. Charles I advanced Sir George Hay to the peerage on 4 May 1627 under the titles of Lord Hay of Kinfauns and Viscount Dupplin. On 25 May 1633, Hay was created the Earl of Kinnoull by King Charles I.

The Hay family share a common ancestor with the Earls of Erroll. Gilbert de la Hay (died April 1333), ancestor of the Earls of Erroll, was the older brother of William de la Hay, ancestor of the Earls of Kinnoull. In 1251, William received a charter of two carucates of land from his brother, which was confirmed by King Alexander III.

In 1711, the unofficial prime minister Robert Harley, 1st Earl of Oxford and Earl Mortimer, made his son-in-law Viscount Dupplin Baron Hay of Pedwardine in the Peerage of Great Britain. This gave him and his successors an automatic seat in the House of Lords, which the earldom did not entitle them to until the Peerage Act 1963 extended that right to all holders of Scottish peerages.

In 2026, the 16th earl was created Baron Kinnoull of the Ochils for life. This will allow him to continue to sit in the House of Lords after the House of Lords (Hereditary Peers) Act 2026 comes into force.

The family seat is Dupplin Castle, just outside Perth, Scotland, and Kinnoull is a neighbourhood of Perth.

== Earls of Kinnoull (1633) ==
- George Hay, 1st Earl of Kinnoull (d. 1634)
- George Hay, 2nd Earl of Kinnoull (d. 1644), son of the first earl
- George Hay, 3rd Earl of Kinnoull (d. 1650), son of the second earl
- William Hay, 4th Earl of Kinnoull (d. 1677), son of the second earl
- George Hay, 5th Earl of Kinnoull (d. 1687), son of fourth earl
- William Hay, 6th Earl of Kinnoull (d. 1709), second son of the fourth earl
- Thomas Hay, 7th Earl of Kinnoull (d. 1719), great-grandson of younger brother of the first earl
- George Hay, 8th Earl of Kinnoull (1689–1758), son of the seventh earl
- Thomas Hay, 9th Earl of Kinnoull (1710–1787), son of the eighth earl
- Robert Hay-Drummond, 10th Earl of Kinnoull (1751–1804), nephew of the ninth earl
- Thomas Hay-Drummond, 11th Earl of Kinnoull (1785–1866), son of the 10th earl
- George Hay-Drummond, 12th Earl of Kinnoull (1827–1897), son of the 11th earl
- Archibald Hay, 13th Earl of Kinnoull (1855–1916), third son of the 12th earl
- George Harley Hay, 14th Earl of Kinnoull (1902–1938), grandson of the 13th earl
- Arthur William George Patrick Hay, 15th Earl of Kinnoull (1935–2013), son of the 14th earl
- Charles William Harley Hay, 16th Earl of Kinnoull (b. 1962), son of the 15th earl

The heir apparent is the present holder's son, William Thomas Charles Hay, Viscount Dupplin (b. 2011).

== Arms ==
Coat of arms of Hay, Earls of Kinnoull
Adopted 1633 Crest An aged Lowland Scots countryman, couped at the knees, vested in grey, waistcoat gules, bonnet azure, bearing on his shoulder an ox-yoke proper. Escutcheon Quarterly: 1st and 4th azure, a unicorn saliant argent, armed, maned and unguled or, within a bordure of the last, charged with eight demi-thistles vert impaled with as many demi-roses gules, for augmentation; 2nd and 3rd argent, three escutcheons gules, for Hay Motto Renovate animos ("Rejuvenate your soul")

Coat of arms of Hay-Drummond Earls of Kinnoull
Adopted 1787 Crest An aged Lowland Scots countryman, couped at the knees, vested in grey, waistcoat gules, bonnet azure, bearing on his shoulder an ox-yoke proper. Escutcheon Quarterly: 1st and 4th grand quarters; 1st and 4th azure, a unicorn saliant argent, armed, maned and unguled or, within a bordure of the last, charged with eight demi-thistles vert impaled with as many demi-roses gules, for augmentation; 2nd and 3rd argent, three escutcheons gules, for Hay; 2nd grand quarter, 1st and 4th or three bars wavy gules, surmounted of a scymitar in pale argent, hilted and pomelled of the field, for Drummond, 2nd and 3rd or, a lion's head erased, within a double-tressure flory-counterflory gules, a coat of augmentation likewise, for Drummond. Motto Renovate animos ("Rejuvenate your soul")

== See also ==
- Kinnoull Hill
