= Edward Hay (diplomat) =

British diplomat and Governor of Barbados

The Honourable Edward Hay (1722 – 21 October 1779) was a British diplomat.

== Biography ==
He was the fourth son of George Hay, 8th Earl of Kinnoull by his wife Abigail, second daughter of Robert Harley, 1st Earl of Oxford. In 1752 he married Mary, daughter of Peter Flower, a London merchant. In that year he was appointed consul at Cadiz, then in 1754 was consul-general in Portugal. He became envoy extraordinary to Portugal in 1757 and minister plenipotentiary in 1762. In 1772 he was appointed Governor of Barbados. His wife died on 11 October 1775, and on 24 January 1779 Hay was remarried in Barbados to Mary Harbourne Barnwell, but he died later that year on 21 October.
