= George Hayes =

George Hayes may refer to:

- Sir George Hayes (judge) (1805–1869), British jurist
- George "Gabby" Hayes (1885–1969), American actor
- George Hayes (English actor) (1888–1967), British stage and film actor
- George Hayes (ice hockey) (1914–1987), Canadian NHL linesman
- George W. Hayes (1847–1933), former slave and politician in Ohio
- George Edward Chalmer Hayes (1894–1968), American civil rights lawyer and public official
- George Hayes (footballer) (1908–1984), Welsh footballer

== See also ==
- George Hays (disambiguation)
- George Hay (disambiguation)
