= George Hay, 8th Earl of Kinnoull =

British politician (1689–1758)

The Right Honourable The Earl of Kinnoull FRS
- Coat of arms of the Earls of Kinnoull

Member of Parliament for Fowey
- In office 1710–1711

Teller of the Exchequer
- In office 1711–1715
- Preceded by: Peregrine Bertie
- Succeeded by: Sir Roger Mostyn, Bt

Personal details
- Born: 23 June 1689
- Died: 28 July 1758 (aged 69) Ashford, Surrey
- Party: Conservative
- Spouse: Abigail Harley (m. 1709)
- Children: 10, including Thomas and Robert
- Parents: Thomas Hay, 7th Earl of Kinnoull; Elizabeth Drummond

George Henry Hay, 8th Earl of Kinnoull FRS (23 June 1689 – 28 July 1758), styled as Viscount Dupplin from 1709 to 1719, was a British peer, Tory politician, and diplomat.

== Biography ==
He was the eldest son of Thomas Hay, 7th Earl of Kinnoull and Elizabeth, daughter of William Drummond, 1st Viscount Strathallan.

In 1708, he came under the wing of Robert Harley, 1st Earl of Oxford and Earl Mortimer, whose position was equal to that of prime minister. He married Oxford's daughter in 1709, and his position as his son-in-law proved advantageous. He was a member of the so-called Tory "October Club."

In 1710, George Hay became the Member of Parliament for Fowey until 1711. He was created Baron Hay of Pedwardine, Herefordshire on 1711. He was created along with eleven others, who became known as Harley's Dozen, with the aim of supporting the Tory government's peace policy in the previously Whig-dominated Lords. He then became the Teller of the Exchequer between 1711 and 1714. William Bromley wrote, on the occasion of Viscount Dupplin accepting the role in 1711, that he was "so pretty a gentleman, so generally well beloved."

He was elected a Fellow of the Royal Society in March 1712. In 1713, he bought Brodsworth Hall, Yorkshire from the Wentworth family and rebuilt the house.

During the Jacobite rising of 1715, he was imprisoned in the Tower of London for suspected Jacobite sympathies from 21 September of that year to 24 June 1716. He was accused of conspiracy in the Atterbury Plot of 1722 but a motion for an inquiry failed in the House of Lords, 64 to 29, even though the earl himself voted in favor of the inquiry. He succeeded to the title of 8th Viscount of Dupplin on 5 January 1718/19. On 5 January 1718 he succeeded to the title of 8th Lord Hay of Kinfauns. In 1720, he lost heavily in the South Sea Bubble. The earl was appointed British ambassador to the Ottoman Empire on 16 May 1729. He arrived at Constantinople on 15 April 1730. Recalled on 19 August 1735, he left Turkey in the autumn of 1736.

He died in Ashford, Surrey, on 28 July 1758.

== Marriage and issue ==
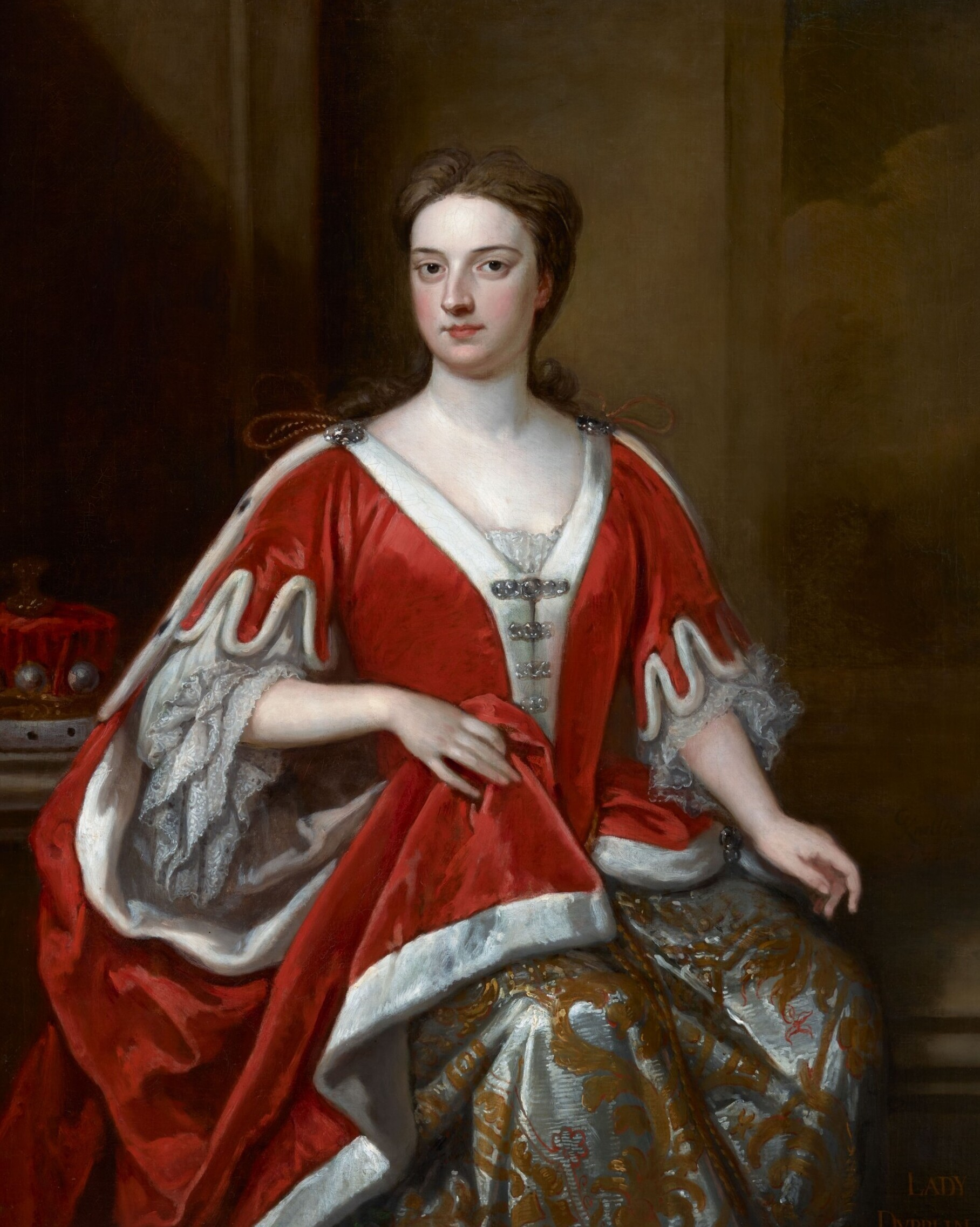
Portrait of Kinnoull's wife Abigail by Sir Godfrey Kneller

He married Harley's elder daughter Abigail around 1 September 1709. They had four sons and six daughters:

1. Thomas Hay, 9th Earl of Kinnoull
2. Robert Hay Drummond, who took on the name and arms of Drummond, as heir of entail of his great-grandfather William Drummond, 1st Viscount Strathallan and became Archbishop of York
3. John Hay (1719–1751), rector of Epworth
4. Edward, British diplomat and Governor of Barbados
5. Lady Margaret, died unmarried
6. Lady Elizabeth, died unmarried in Edinburgh on 15 September 1791
7. Lady Anne, died unmarried
8. Lady Abigail, died unmarried in London on 7 July 1785, aged 69
9. Lady Henrietta, married on 30 July 1754, to Robert Roper, Chancellor of the diocese of York, and died without issue, at Oxford on 9 October 1798, aged 81
10. Lady Mary, married on 5 August 1758, to bishop John Hume, Bishop of Oxford and Salisbury. Died 26 August 1805, aged 82

Diplomatic posts
| Preceded by Abraham Stanyan | British Ambassador to the Ottoman Empire; 1729–1737 | Succeeded by Everard Fawkener |
Parliament of Great Britain
| Preceded by George Granville; Henry Vincent | Member of Parliament for Fowey with Henry Vincent; 1710–1711 | Succeeded by Henry Vincent; Bernard Granville |
Political offices
| Preceded by Peregrine Bertie | Teller of the Exchequer; 1711–1715 | Succeeded by Sir Roger Mostyn, Bt |
Peerage of Scotland
| Preceded by Thomas Hay | Earl of Kinnoull; 1719–1758 | Succeeded by Thomas Hay |
Peerage of Great Britain
| New creation | Baron Hay of Pedwardine; 1711–1758 | Succeeded by Thomas Hay |
