= William Hay, 15th Earl of Kinnoull =

Scottish hereditary peer, surveyor and farmer

The Right Honourable The Earl of Kinnoull FRICS
- The 15th Earl of Kinnoull

Personal details
- Born: Arthur William George Patrick Hay; 26 May 1935 Marylebone, London
- Died: 7 June 2013 (aged 78) Perth, Scotland
- Party: Conservative
- Spouse: Ann Gay Lowson (m. 1961)
- Children: Charles Hay, 16th Earl of Kinnoull; Lady Melissa Hay; Lady Iona Hay; Lady Atalanta Hay
- Parents: George Hay, 14th Earl of Kinnoull; Mary Meyrick
- Occupation: Farmer, politician

Arthur William George Patrick Hay, 15th Earl of Kinnoull FRICS (26 May 1935 – 7 June 2013), styled Viscount Dupplin until 1938, was a Scottish hereditary peer, surveyor, farmer, and member of the House of Lords. His titles were Earl of Kinnoull, Viscount Dupplin and Lord Hay of Kinfauns in the Peerage of Scotland; and Baron Hay of Pedwardine in the Peerage of Great Britain.

== Biography ==
Known as William, the 15th Earl was born in 1935, the third born but first surviving son of the 14th Earl and his second wife, Mary Ethel Isobel Meyrick, daughter of Dr. Ferdinand Richard Holmes Meyrick and Kate Meyrick. At age 3, he succeeded his father in the earldom upon the latter's death at aged 35, of an unspecified illness.

He was educated at Eton College and Royal Agricultural University in Cirencester. At age 22, he took his place in the House of Lords.

He was the junior conservative whip in the House of Lords in 1966–1968 and opposition party spokesman on aviation. He was also an assembly member of the Council of Europe, working at cooperation on fishing and agriculture; president of the National Council on Inland Transport, and vice-president of the National Association of Local Councils.

He worked for Langley Taylor Surveyors in London, where he was a senior partner for more than 30 years, and was a Fellow of the Royal Institution of Chartered Surveyors. He was also an active sportsman, playing squash and tennis, and was a member of the Royal Company of Archers.

He married Ann Gay Lowson, daughter of Sir Denys Lowson, 1st Baronet, on 1 June 1961. They had four children: Charles, Melissa, Iona and Atalanta. Lady Kinnoull died in 2016.

Peerage of Scotland
Preceded by George Hay	Earl of Kinnoull; 1938–2013	Succeeded by Charles Hay
Peerage of Great Britain
Preceded by George Hay	Baron Hay of Pedwardine; 1938–2013; Member of the House of Lords (1957–1999)	Succeeded by Charles Hay
