= William Douglas, 9th Earl of Morton =

William Douglas, Earl of Morton (died before 1 November 1681) was a Scottish nobleman and Earl of Morton.

He was the son of Robert Douglas, 8th Earl of Morton, and Anne Villiers. He succeeded as the 9th Earl of Morton on 12 November 1649.

William tried to preserve the grant of the Islands of Orkney and Zetland which had been given to his grandfather, Sir William, 7th Earl of Morton. The wadset (a loan masked as a sale of land under right of reversion) of the Lordship had been set aside, and annexed to the Commonwealth in 1657. On the Restoration, he obtained a new grant, which confirmation was ratified by Parliament in 1661. However, this too was pronounced null and void, and the islands were vested in the Crown by the Orkney and Shetland Act 1669 on 17 December 1669. Thenceforward the Earls of Morton held these islands under a form of mortgage from the Crown.

On 9 September 1672 he resigned the Barony of Dalkeith in favour of James Scott, 1st Duke of Monmouth. The estate of Dalkeith and other lands, to the total value of £100,000 Scots yearly rental, had been sold circa 1643 to Buccleuch to enable the 7th Earl meet his expenses supporting the King.

William married Lady Grizel Middleton, daughter of John Middleton, 1st Earl of Middleton, in 1662. Their only son, Charles, Lord Dalkeith, died in infancy in 1663. William died in 1681 leaving no heir, passing the Earldom to his uncle, James Douglas, 10th Earl of Morton, who was the son of William Douglas, 7th Earl of Morton and Lady Anne Keith.

== Notes ==
Peerage of Scotland
Preceded by Robert Douglas	Earl of Morton; 1649–1681	Succeeded by James Douglas
