= George Hay, 2nd Earl of Kinnoull =

Scottish peer

The Right Honourable The Earl of Kinnoull
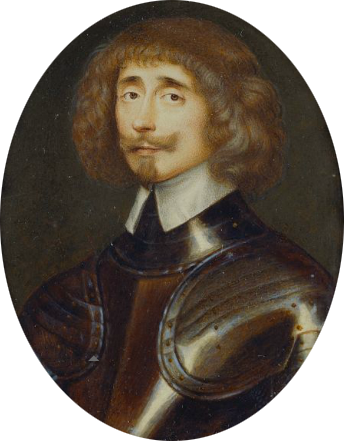
- The Earl of Kinnoull, by David des Granges

Captain of the Yeomen of the Guard

2n Earl of Kinnoull, 2nd Viscount of Dupplin, 2nd Lord Hay of Kinfauns and 7th Baron of Kinfauns, in Scotland
- In office 1632–1635

Member of the Parliament of Scotland
- In office 15 May 1639 – 17 November 1641

Personal details
- Born: 1596
- Died: 5 October 1644 (aged 47–48) Whitehall, London
- Spouse: Ann Douglas
- Children: 12, including George and William
- Parents: George Hay, 1st Earl of Kinnoull; Margaret Halyburton

Sir George Hay, 2nd Earl of Kinnoull, PC (1596 – 5 October 1644), styled Lord Kinfauns between 1621 and 1634, was a Scottish peer, military officer, and political official.

== Biography ==
He was the son of George Hay, 1st Earl of Kinnoull, who was created the Earl of Kinnoull by King Charles in 1633, and Margaret, daughter of Sir James Halyburton.

He was a member of the Privy Council, and served as Captain of the Yeomen of the Guard from 1632 to 1635. He was fiercely loyal to as a loyalist to King Charles; he fought in the English Civil War, when he distinguished himself "by unshaken fidelity to his unfortunate sovereign, and gallant and active services as a soldier in his cause."

On the death of his father he inherited the lands and Lordship of Kinfauns succeeding as Lord Kinfauns with ratification of his infeftment by parliament in 1641.

In 1643, the earl refused to sign the Solemn League and Covenant.

The earl died in Whitehall, 5 October 1644. He was buried at Waltham Abbey Church in Essex.

== Family ==
His older brother, Sir Peter Hay, died unmarried in 1621, leaving George to succeed to the earldom. In 1622, he married Ann, eldest daughter of William Douglas, 7th Earl of Morton. They had six sons and six daughters:

1. George Hay, 3rd Earl of Kinnoull
2. William Hay, 4th Earl of Kinnoull
3. James
4. Robert
5. Peter, baptized 11 June 1632
6. Charles
7. Anna
8. Margaret
9. Mary, married 6 February 1662, George Keith, 8th Earl Marischal
10. Elizabeth
11. Jean
12. Catherine (11 September 1641 – 11 January 1733)

Military offices
Preceded by The Earl of Holland	Captain of the Yeomen of the Guard; 1632–1635	Succeeded by The Earl of Morton
Peerage of Scotland
Preceded by George Hay	Earl of Kinnoull; 1634–1644	Succeeded by George Hay
Preceded by George Hay	Lord Kinfauns; 1634–1644	Succeeded by Sir Alexander Blair
