= Robert Douglas, 8th Earl of Morton =

Scottish nobleman

Robert Douglas, Earl of Morton (died 12 November 1649) was a Scottish nobleman and Earl of Morton. He was the son of William Douglas, 7th Earl of Morton and Lady Anne Keith, daughter of George Keith, 5th Earl Marischal.

== Life ==
In April 1627, Robert Douglas, then known as Lord Dalkeith, married Anne Villiers, a daughter of Sir Edward Villiers. George Villiers, 1st Duke of Buckingham, promised to pay his father, William Douglas, 7th Earl of Morton, £5,000 and settle a landed income of £3,000 yearly on Lord Dalkeith of which £1,000 would be Anne's jointure and £1,000 used for the couple's expenses.

After his father's death, Robert acted in a high-handed way in Orkney, overriding udal law, to raise money for the royalist cause. The Morton interest in Orkney was a royal grant of Charles I, to compensate the 7th Earl for his subsidies and losses in the royal cause. At this point of the War of the Three Kingdoms the Morton control of Orkney assumed importance, because the forces of James Graham, 1st Marquess of Montrose intended in 1649 to land there and re-open the fighting in Scotland.

Robert Douglas died on 12 November 1649, in Kirkwall.

== Family ==
He was succeeded by his son, William Douglas, 9th Earl of Morton. He also had two daughters by his wife: Lady Anne Douglas, who married the Earl Marischal, and Lady Mary Douglas, who married Sir Donald Macdonald.

== Notes ==
Peerage of Scotland
Preceded by William Douglas	Earl of Morton; 1648–1649	Succeeded by William Douglas
