= William Douglas, 7th Earl of Morton =

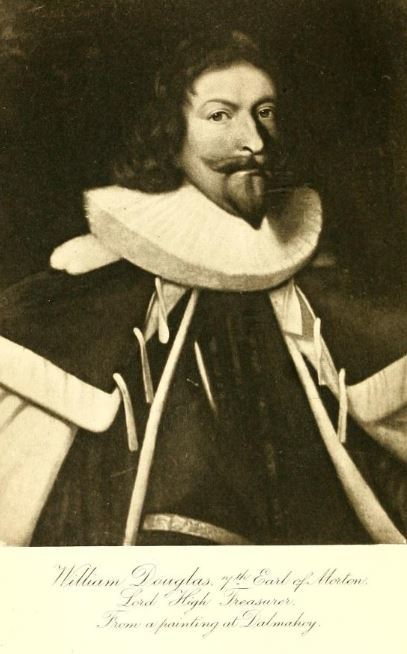
William Douglas, 7th Earl of Morton, KG

William Douglas, 7th Earl of Morton (1582 – 7 August 1648) was a grandson of the 6th Earl of Morton. He was Treasurer of Scotland, and a zealous Royalist.

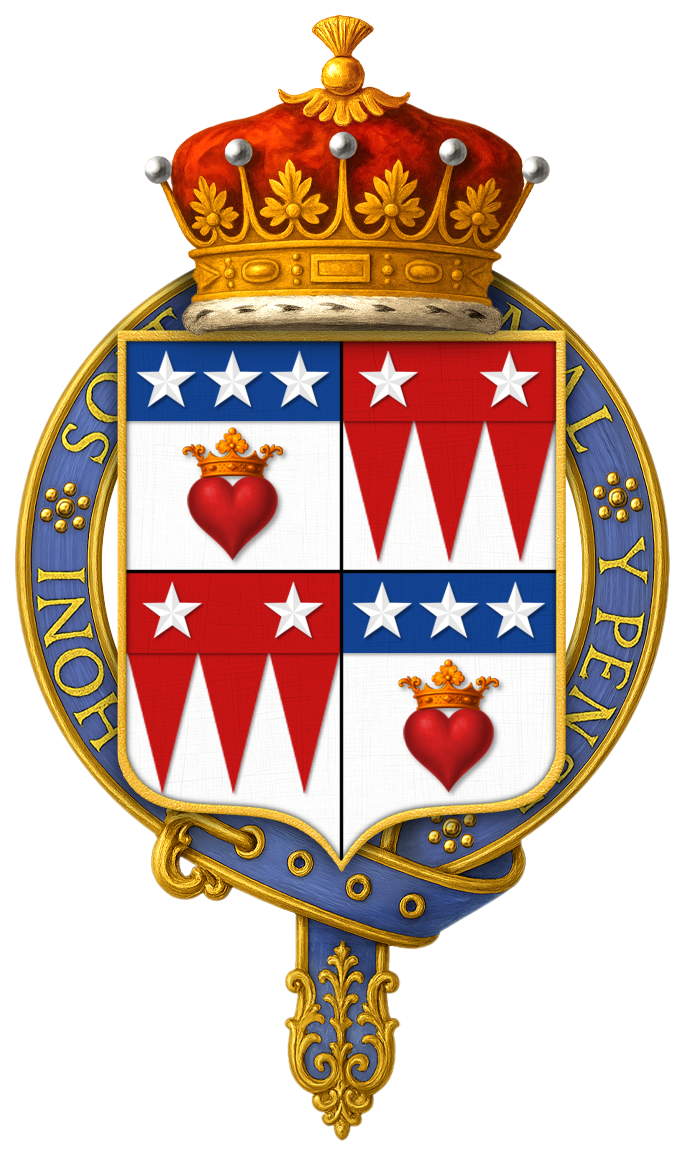
Garter-encircled arms of Sir William Douglas, 7th Earl of Morton, KG

== Life ==
He was the son of Robert Douglas, Master of Morton, and Jean Lyon, daughter of John Lyon, 8th Lord Glamis.

There was a rumour in the summer of 1602 that he, the "young Earl of Morton", would marry Elizabeth Stewart, the eldest daughter of the exiled Francis Stewart, 5th Earl of Bothwell, who was described as "a very gallant lady".

In May 1617 he was travelling in France, and met up in Bourges with Henry Erskine, the son of the Earl of Mar and his French-born second-wife Marie Stewart. One of their companions fell sick, and Morton asked if the doctors had bezoar stones, and they scorned him for believing in such things. Morton left Bourges for Lyon with the Earl of Angus, and was thinking of visiting the court of the Elector Palatine.

Morton himself became ill at Paris of a "dangerous" and "irrecoverable and deadly disease." King James wrote to the Earl of Mar from Theobalds on 26 March 1618 asking him take measures to protect Morton's son's inheritance. However, Morton recovered.

Morton offended decorum at court at the time of the death of James VI and I. In April 1625, when the body of the king was bought from Theobalds, it was noticed that the Earls of Morton and Roxburghe were not in attendance, but had gone to be "merry" at More Park with Lucy Russell, Countess of Bedford.

Morton was Treasurer of Scotland from 1630 to 1636. He extended his home at Aberdour Castle in Fife, with a Renaissance-style east wing, with a long gallery overlooking a formal terraced garden.

On the outbreak of the Wars of the Three Kingdoms in 1642, he provided £100,000 for the Royalist cause by selling his Dalkeith estates to the Earl of Buccleuch.

== Family ==
In June 1602 there was a rumour he would marry one of the Earl of Bothwell's daughters, who was "a very gallant lady". On 28 March 1604, he married Lady Anne Keith, a daughter of George Keith, 5th Earl Marischal, and they had ten children:

- Margaret Douglas (1610–1678), married Archibald Campbell, 1st Marquess of Argyll and had issue.
- Anne Douglas (d. 1667), married the George Hay, 2nd Earl of Kinnoull and had issue.
- Robert Douglas, 8th Earl of Morton (d. 1649), married Anne Villiers, their son was William Douglas, 9th Earl of Morton (d.1681).
- Lady Mary Douglas, married Charles Seton, 2nd Earl of Dunfermline and had issue.
- James Douglas, 10th Earl of Morton (d. 1686) He succeeded his nephew as earl in 1681.
- Isabel Douglas (1630-1673), who married James Graham, 2nd Marquess of Montrose and had issue.
- Nicholas Douglas (d. 1686).
- Jean Douglas, who married James Home, 3rd Earl of Home.
- Agnes Douglas

== Claimant to the earldom ==
John Maxwell, 9th Lord Maxwell (c. 1586–1613), a descendant of the 3rd Earl, also claimed the earldom of Morton, but was attainted in 1609 and his rights then failed. His titles and estates were restored in 1618 to his brother Robert, with the title of Earl of Nithsdale (1620) in lieu of Morton.

Political offices
Preceded by The Earl of Mar	Lord High Treasurer of Scotland; 1630–1636	Succeeded by Earl of Traquair
Preceded by The Earl of Kinnoull	Captain of the Yeomen of the Guard; 1635–1649	Succeeded by The Viscount Grandison
Peerage of Scotland
Preceded by William Douglas	Earl of Morton; 1606–1648	Succeeded by Robert Douglas
