= Denys Lowson =

British barrister and financier (1906–1975)

Sir Denys Colquhoun Flowerdew Lowson, 1st Baronet (22 January 1906 – 10 September 1975) was a British barrister and financier who served as Lord Mayor of London in 1950–51.

== Early life and education ==
Lowson was born at Snitterfield House, Warwickshire, the third child and second son of James Gray Flowerdew Lowson, a Scottish paper manufacturer, and Adelaide Louisa Scott. His mother was born in British India, the daughter of Col. Courtenay Harvey Saltren Scott of the Bengal Staff Corps, who was born in Dublin, Ireland, and Margaret Julia Colquhoun, a novelist.

Lowson's elder brother, Courtenay Patrick Flowerdew Lowson (1897–1917), was killed in action in the First World War. His sister, Eleanor, married Maj.-Gen. William Revell Revell-Smith.

He was educated at Winchester College and Christ Church, Oxford.

== Career ==
In 1930, he was admitted as a barrister to the Inner Temple. He gained prestige as a financier, specialising in unit trusts, and in the 1940s took control of the National Group of Unit Trusts. According to The Times, Lowson "showed consistently that he was more concerned to turn situations to the advantage of himself and the interests he controlled than with his fiduciary duty to the companies of which he was a director."

Lowson served as Sheriff of the City of London (1939–40), Alderman of London (1942–73) and Lord Mayor of London (1950–51). Lowson, then 44, became the youngest modern Lord Mayor upon his election. He was also High Steward of Stratford-upon-Avon in 1952 and Governor of the Royal Shakespeare Theatre in Stratford-upon-Avon. He was also a Freeman of the City of London. Lowson held a number of positions of influence in various organisations, including as governor of hospitals, a Master of livery companies and president and vice-president of multiple national and Commonwealth organisations.

He was created a Baronet Lowson, of Westlaws, County Perth, on 27 June 1951.

== Financial troubles and death ==
In July 1974, the Investors Chronicle published an exposé on Lowson, in which it revealed his financial empire was a "tangle of cross shareholdings, based on some 100 trading and industrial companies throughout the world, owned and controlled, at the end, through 14 often interrelated investment trusts." It was revealed that in 1972, Sir Denys bought shares of the National Group, which he controlled, for just 62 pence each and resold them within months for £8.67 each, for an estimated personal profit of £5 million. After an investigation requested by the Secretary of State for Trade and Industry, inspectors accused Sir Denys of "grave mismanagement" of his companies "to obtain very substantial gain for himself and his family."

Sir Denys apologised and promised to make substantial repayments, while his legal counsel blamed his mistakes on "age, ill-health, obstinacy and secretiveness rather than to any intent to deceive" — an explanation rejected by inspectors. Within a few weeks, Lowson retired from executive positions in his various companies and trusts.

His health rapidly declining, Sir Denys went on an extended cruise on the Queen Elizabeth 2. He died the following year in Marylebone, London, aged 69. He was buried at Kinfauns Parish Church in Kinfauns, Perth and Kinross, Scotland.

Following Lowson's death, Philip Inman, 1st Baron Inman wrote to The Times:

Many of his old friends will feel a sense of sadness at the death of Sir Denys Lowson. It is so easy to publicize recent happenings which clouded his latter years. "The evil that men do lives after them; the good is oft interred with their bones." I like to recall the good that Sir Denys did in his lifetime, much of which was done in a kindly and unobtrusive way. I recall with gratitude the many kindnesses he showed to me particularly in my hospital work. He not only gave of his substance, but of his time in the midst of a busy life. These are the things for which many of us will remember him.

— Lord Inman, The Times, 18 September 1975

== Family ==
On 17 July 1936, Lowson married Hon. Ann Patricia Macpherson, daughter of Ian Macpherson, 1st Baron Strathcarron. They had three children:

- Sir Ian Patrick Lowson, 2nd Baronet (born 4 September 1944), married Tanya Theresa Judge
- Gay Ann Lowson, Countess of Kinnoull (1938–2016), married the 15th Earl of Kinnoull
- Melanie Fiona Louisa Lowson (born 1940), married Charles Archibald Adam Black

Lady Lowson died in 2003.

Political offices
Preceded by Sir Frederick Rowland, Bt	Lord Mayor of London; 1950–1951	Succeeded by Sir Leslie Boyce
Baronetage of the United Kingdom
New creation	Baronet (of Westlaws); 1951–1975	Succeeded by Ian Patrick Lowson
