= George Hay, 5th Earl of Kinnoull =

Scottish peer and soldier

The Right Honourable The Earl of Kinnoull
- Coat of arms of the Earls of Kinnoull

Personal details
- Died: 1687 Hungary
- Parents: William Hay, 4th Earl of Kinnoull; Lady Catherine Cecil

George Hay, 5th Earl of Kinnoull (died 1687) was a Scottish peer and soldier.

== Biography ==
He was the eldest son of William Hay, 4th Earl of Kinnoull, the fourth Earl of Kinnoull, and his second wife, Lady Catherine, daughter of Charles Cecil, Viscount Cranborne. His date of birth is not recorded, but his father's first wife died in 1665.

He succeeded to the earldom in 1677 after his father's death. He served in the Imperial Army, fighting against the Ottoman Empire.

He died, unmarried, in Hungary a decade later.

Upon his death the earldom passed to his younger brother, William Hay.

Peerage of Scotland
Preceded by William Hay	Earl of Kinnoull; 1677–1687	Succeeded by William Hay
