= George Hay, 14th Earl of Kinnoull =

Scottish peer (1902–1938)

The Right Honourable The Earl of Kinnoull
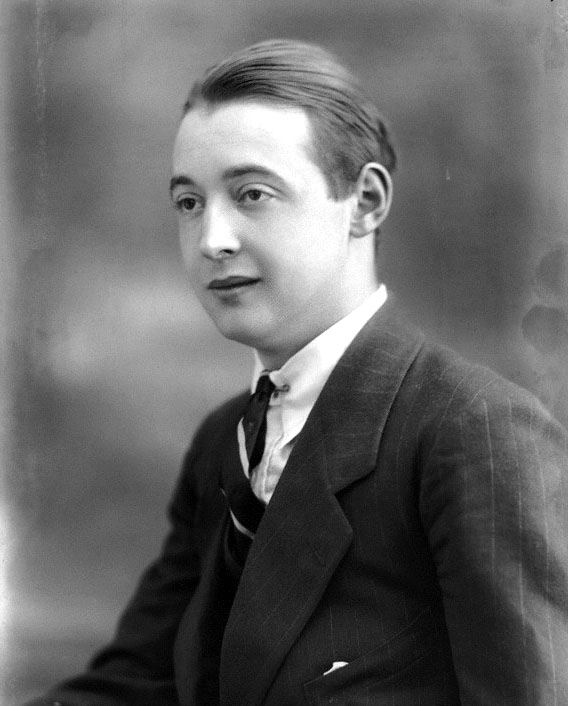
- Earl of Kinnoull, 1920

Personal details
- Born: George Harley Hay; 30 March 1902 London, United Kingdom
- Died: 19 March 1938 (aged 35) London, United Kingdom
- Party: Labour
- Spouses: Enid Margaret Hamlyn Hamilton-Fellows (m. 1923; div. 1927) Mary Meyrick (m. 1928)
- Children: Lady Venetia; Lady June; William Hay, 15th Earl of Kinnoull
- Parents: Edmund Alfred Rollo George, Viscount Dupplin; Gladys Luz Bacon

George Harley Hay, 14th Earl of Kinnoull (30 March 1902 – 19 March 1938), styled as Viscount Dupplin from 1903 to 1916, was a Scottish peer. His titles were Earl of Kinnoull, Viscount Dupplin and Lord Hay of Kinfauns in the Peerage of Scotland; and Baron Hay of Pedwardine in the Peerage of Great Britain.

== Biography ==
Hay was the son of Edmund Alfred Rollo George, Viscount Dupplin (12 November 1879 – 30 May 1903) and Gladys Luz Bacon, granddaughter of Major-General Anthony Bacon and Lady Charlotte Harley. His father died in 1903 of scarlet fever. He had been visiting Sir Edward Hamilton of Iping when he fell ill.

Hay was educated at Eton College, and succeeded to the earldom in 1916 on the death of his grandfather, Archibald Hay, 13th Earl of Kinnoull.

He entered the House of Lords as a Conservative, but in 1930 joined the Labour Party. Although he stated "I personally entirely disagree with the principle of hereditary legislators", and favoured abolition of the House of Lords "in its present form", he rarely missed a debate. In June 1933, it was stated that Lord Hay had not missed a session for the preceding 12 months, and overall had an overall attendance rate of 97%.

The earl worked as a stockbroker and for an insurance company for some time. He filed for bankruptcy in 1926, which garnered press coverage.

He was married twice; the first, in 1923, to Enid Margaret Hamlyn Hamilton-Fellowes, a granddaughter of Sir Frederick Wills, 1st Baronet. They had one son:

- George Adam, Lord Hay of Kinfauns (November 1924 – March 1925), died of meningitis.

They were divorced in 1927. He later married Mary Ethel Isobel, daughter of Dr. Ferdinand R. Meyrick and famed nightclub owner Kate Meyrick, and had four children:

1. Lady Venetia Constance Katherine Luz (born 1929), married Joseph Trevor Davies
2. George Robert, Lord Hay of Kinfauns (9–19 May 1931)
3. Lady June Ann (1932-2002), married Cranley Onslow
4. William Hay (1935–2013)

He died at a London nursing home, of an unspecified lengthy illness (later reported as pancreatic cancer), at age 35. The earldom passed to his only living son, William.

Peerage of Scotland
| Preceded by Archibald Hay | Earl of Kinnoull; 1916–1938 | Succeeded by William Hay |
