= Lowson baronets =

Baronetcy in the Baronetage of the United Kingdom

The Lowson baronetcy, of Westlaws in the County of Perth, is a title in the Baronetage of the United Kingdom.

== History ==
The baronetcy was created on 27 June 1951 for the Old Wykehamist Denys Lowson, the youngest ever Lord Mayor of London elected, serving the corporation's year 1950–1951.

Since 1975, the title has been held by his son, Sir Ian Patrick Lowson, 2nd Bt. (born 4 September 1944). He was named to the Order of the Eagle of Georgia (exact rank unknown). He is Chairman of the Standing Council of the Baronetage. His wife, Lady Lowson, is a Patroness of the Royal Caledonian Ball.

== Lowson baronets, of Westlaws (1951) ==
- Sir Denys Colquhoun Flowerdew Lowson, 1st Baronet (1906–1975)
- Sir Ian Patrick Lowson, 2nd Baronet (born 4 September 1944), son of the above

The sole heir to the baronetcy is Henry William Lowson (born 10 November 1980).
