= William Drummond, 1st Viscount Strathallan =

Scottish army officer and politician (died 1688)

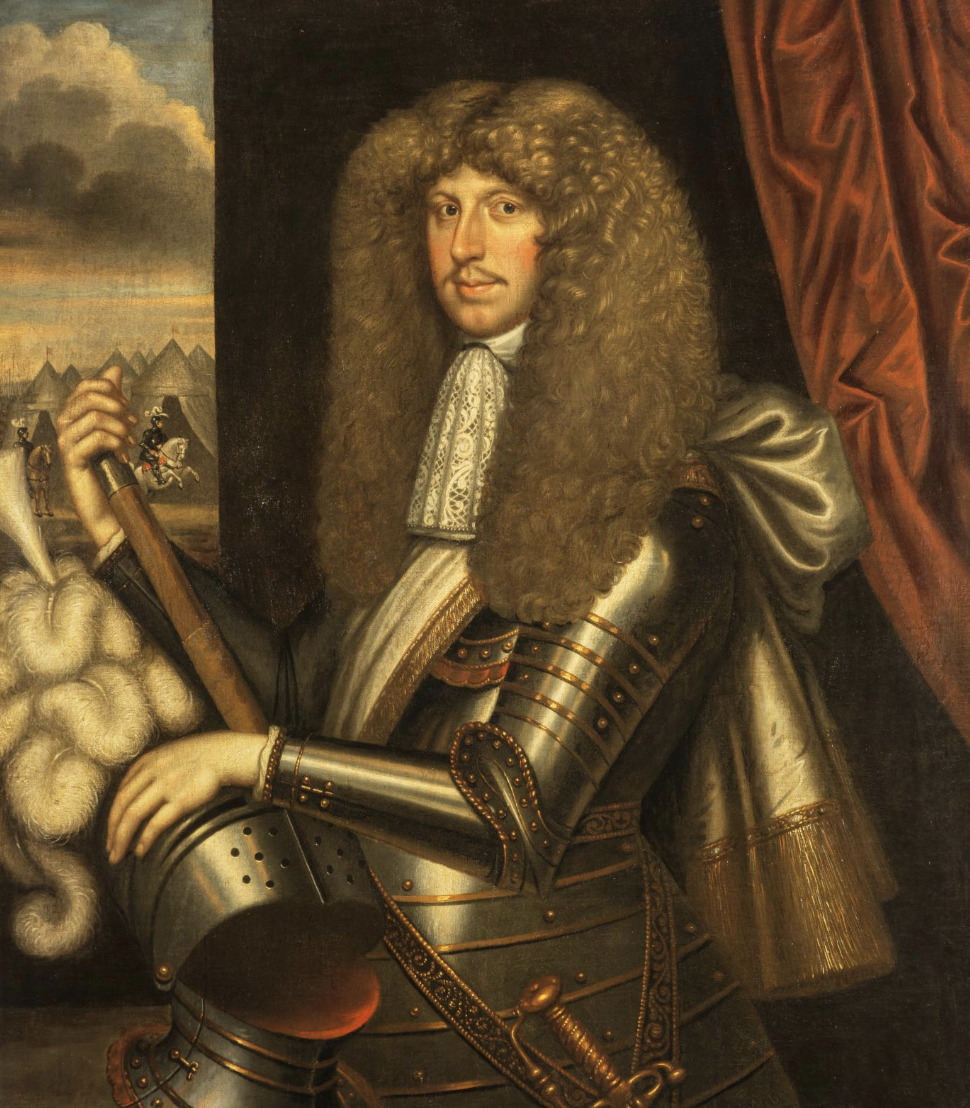
Portrait of Strathallan

William Drummond, 1st Viscount of Strathallan (1617? – 1688) was a Scottish army officer and politician. He served as a Commissioner for Perthshire in the parliaments of 1669–74, 1681–82 and 1685–86, and at the Convention of Estates of 1678. Drummond was a Royalist general and held a command in the Engagement of 1648. He served in Ireland under the Marquis of Ormonde and was taken prisoner at the Battle of Worcester, but escaped.

He served as Lieutenant-General in the Muscovite army. After the Restoration he was appointed Major-General of the forces in Scotland (1666). Drummond was imprisoned for 12 months in Dumbarton Castle. He served as General of the Ordnance (1684), general of the forces in Scotland, and was a Lord of the Treasury on the accession of James VII.

== Background ==
Drummond was the fifth and youngest son of John Drummond, second Baron Maderty, by his wife, Helen, eldest daughter of Patrick Lesly, commendator of Lindores. His father was among the first of the nobility who joined the Marquis of Montrose at Bothwell after the battle of Kilsyth in 1645, for which he suffered imprisonment. Born in 1617 or 1618, Drummond was educated at the university of St Andrews. From 1641 to 1645 he served with Colonel Robert Monro in Ireland, and subsequently with the latter's nephew, Sir George Monro, who succeeded to the Irish command. He was present when Sir George put the Marquis of Argyll to flight at Stirling in 1648. During the same year he again went over to Ireland and joined the Marquis of Ormonde, then in arms for the king. In 1648–9 he was in London. There, says Burnet, Drummond was recommended by some friends among the covenanters to Cromwell.

=== At odds with Cromwell ===
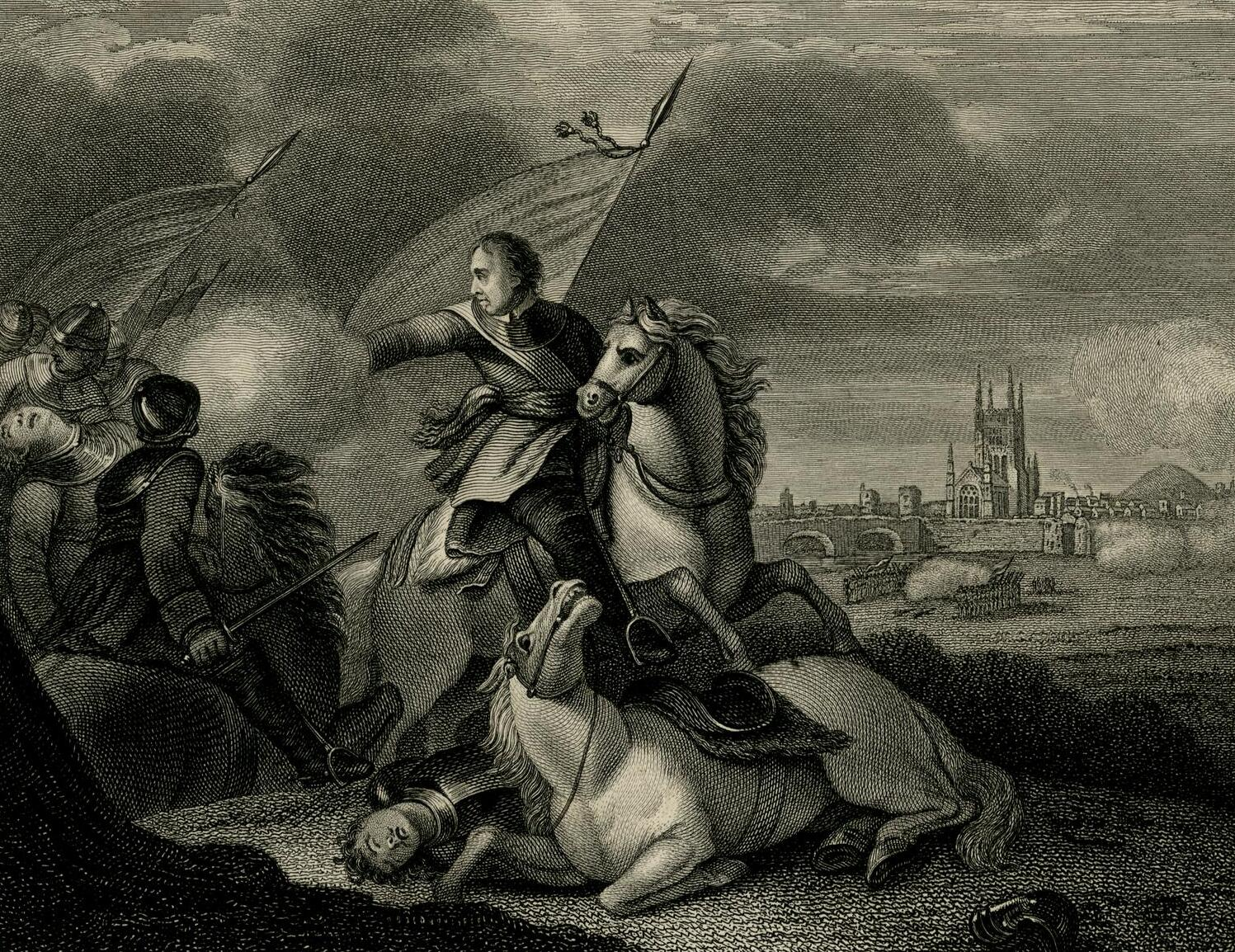
Scene from the Battle of Worcester

He happened to hear Cromwell's discussion with the commissioners sent from Scotland to protest against putting the king to death, and he afterwards told Burnet that 'Cromwell had plainly the better of them at their own weapon, and upon their own principles' (Own Time, Oxford edition, i. 71–3). After witnessing the preparations for the execution of the king, the next day he joined Charles II in Holland. At the battle of Worcester in 1651, where he commanded a brigade, he was taken prisoner and carried to Windsor, but managed to escape and reach the king at Paris. He soon afterwards landed at Yarmouth, and contrived to reach Scotland disguised as a carrier, bearing with him the royal commission. He was with the royalists under the Earl of Glencairn in the highlands in 1653, where his kinsman, Andrew Drummond, brother of Sir James Drummond of Machanay, commanded a regiment of Athole-men, and continued in their ranks until they were dispersed by the parliamentary general, Morgan, at the end of 1654 (Burnet, i. 103–4).

=== Service in Russia ===
He now sought permission of Charles to enter the Muscovite service. Accordingly, in August 1655 he accompanied his friend Thomas Dalyell [q. v.] to Russia (Egerton MS. 15856, f. 69 b), where he was appointed colonel. He quickly gained the favour of the czar, Alexis Michaelovitch, and became a major-general. In 1662, he was attacked by superior enemy forces near Chausy, but won a complete victory. In 1663, he was awarded the rank of lieutenant-general. As he himself says, he 'served long in the wars at home and abroad against the Polonians and Tartars' (Genealogie of the most Ancient House of Drummond). After the Restoration it was not without great difficulty that Charles prevailed on the czar to allow Drummond to leave his dominions. He returned to England in 1665, bringing with him a flattering testimonial of his services from Alexis (Addit. MS. 21408).

=== Major-general of Scottish forces ===
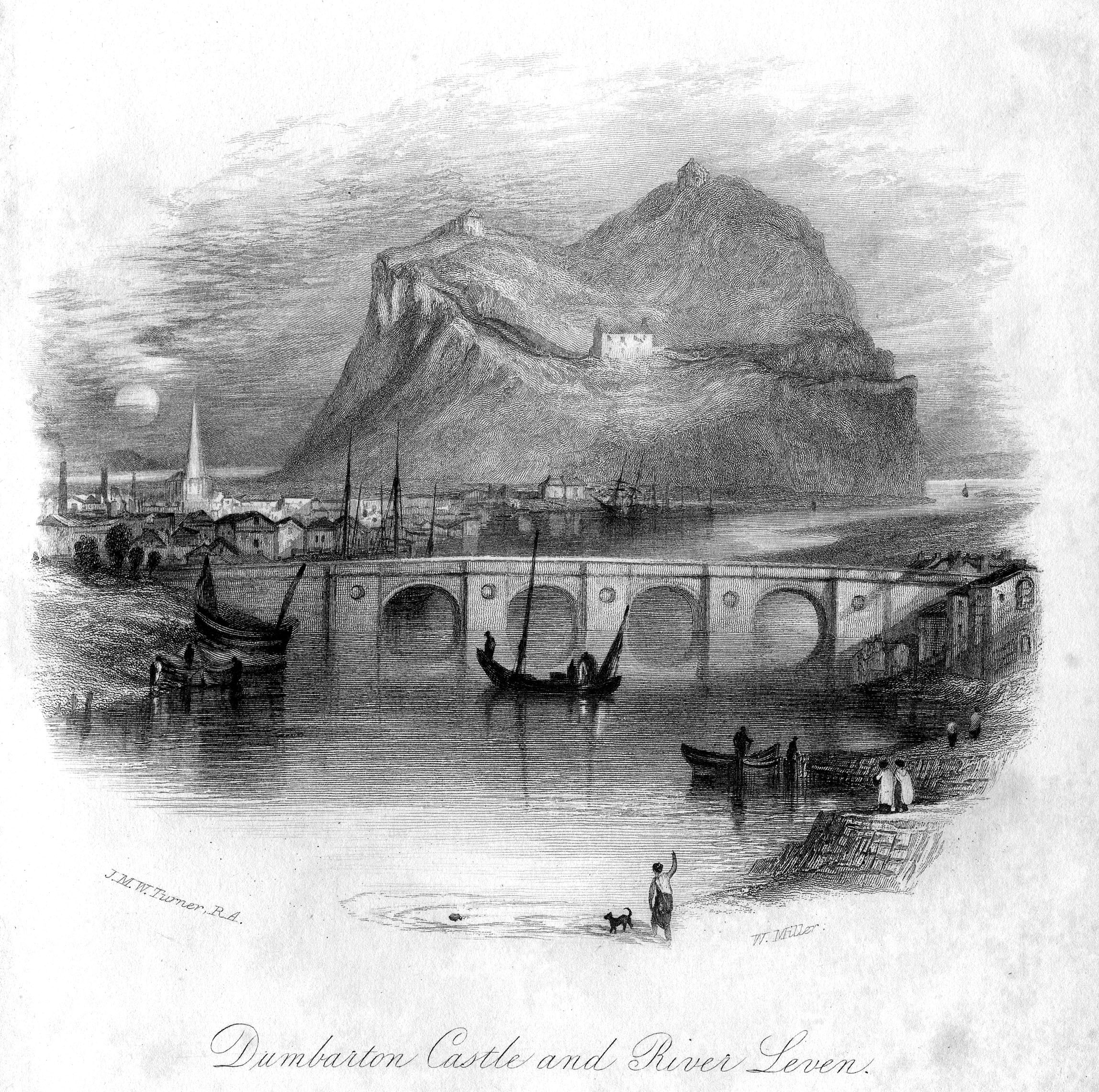
Dumbarton Castle where Drummond was imprisoned

In January 1666 the king appointed him major-general of the forces in Scotland, with a seat on the council (Cal. State Papers, Dom. 1666–7, pp. 18, 575). He was thought to have become a severe disciplinarian; 'he had yet too much of the air of Russia about him,’ says Burnet (i. 499). With Dalyell he was popularly supposed to have introduced torture by the thumbscrew, 'having seen it in Moscovia' (Lauder, Historical Notices of Scotch Affairs, Bannatyne Club, ii. 557). In 1667 he went to London to urge upon the king the necessity of a standing army and the harshest measures against the refusers of the declaration (Wodrow, Church of Scotland, ed. Burns, ii. 81). Little accustomed to brook contradiction, he found himself in constant conflict with Lauderdale, who on 29 Sept. 1674 caused him to be imprisoned in Dumbarton Castle on a mere surmise of his having corresponded with some of the exiled covenanters in Holland (Wodrow, ii. 270; Burnet, ii. 56–7; Addit. MS. 23137, f. 49).

=== Knighthood ===
On being released by order dated 24 Feb. 1675–6 (Wodrow, ii. 357), he was restored to his command, and between 1678 and 1681 received the honour of knighthood. He represented Perthshire in the parliament of 1669–74, in the convention of 1678, and in the parliaments of 1681–2 and 1685–6 (Foster, Members of Parliament, Scotland, 2nd edition, p. 105). Towards the end of March 1678 he, along with the Duke of Hamilton and others, made a journey to court in order to represent the grievances of the country to the king (Wodrow, ii. 449, 453). In 1684 he was appointed general of the ordnance. On the accession of James VII the following year he was nominated lieutenant-general of the forces in Scotland, and a lord of the treasury. In April 1684, on the resignation of his brother David, third baron Maderty, 'to save expenses,’ he succeeded to that title (Lauder, Historical Notices, Bannatyne Club, ii. 535), and was created Viscount of Strathallan and Baron Drummond of Cromlix, by patent 6 Sept. 1686. In March 1686 he accompanied the Duke of Hamilton and Sir George Lockhart to Westminster to confer with the king, who had proposed that, while full liberty should be granted to the Roman Catholics in Scotland, the persecution of the covenanters should go on without mitigation. Drummond, although a loose and profane man, 'ambitious and covetous,’ had yet sufficient sense of honour to restrain him from public apostasy. In the significant phrase of a relative, he lived and died 'a bad christian but a good protestant.' On returning to Edinburgh he joined with his colleagues in declaring that he could not do what the king asked (Macaulay, Hist. of England, vol. ii. ch. vi. pp. 117, 121).

== Heraldic augmentation ==
The king awarded him an heraldic augmentation of honour (to be quartered by his paternal arms) of Or, a lion's head erased within a double tressure flory counter-flory gules.

== Drummond's death ==
He died at the end of March (not January) 1688 (Luttrell, Relation of State Affairs, 1857, i. 436), and was buried at Innerpeffray on 4 April, aged 70. His funeral sermon by Principal Alexander Monro of Edinburgh contains many interesting details of his life. After his return to Scotland he married Elizabeth, daughter of Sir Archibald Johnston, lord Warriston, and widow of Thomas Hepburn of Humbie, Haddingtonshire. By this lady, who was buried at St. George's, Southwark, in 1679, he had one daughter, Elizabeth, married to Thomas Hay, 7th Earl of Kinnoull, and a son William, second viscount of Strathallan. The latter died 7 July 1702. Drummond's male line failed on the death of his grandson William, third viscount, 26 May 1711, at the age of 16. Drummond, who had "a great measure of knowledge and learning" (Burnet, i. 416), drew up in 1681 a valuable history of his family, a hundred copies of which were privately printed by David Laing, 4to, Edinburgh, 1831 (Lowndes, Bibl. Manual, ed. Bohn, ii. 677). A few of his letters to Glencairn, Tweeddale, Lauderdale, and Lady Lauderdale, are preserved among the Additional MSS. in the British Museum (Addit. MS. 4156; Index to Cat. of Additions to the MSS. 1854–75, p. 447).

== Sources ==
- This article incorporates text from a publication now in the public domain: "Drummond, William (1617?-1688)". Dictionary of National Biography. London: Smith, Elder & Co. 1885–1900.
