= George Hay, 1st Earl of Kinnoull =

Scottish nobleman

The Right Honourable The Earl of Kinnoull
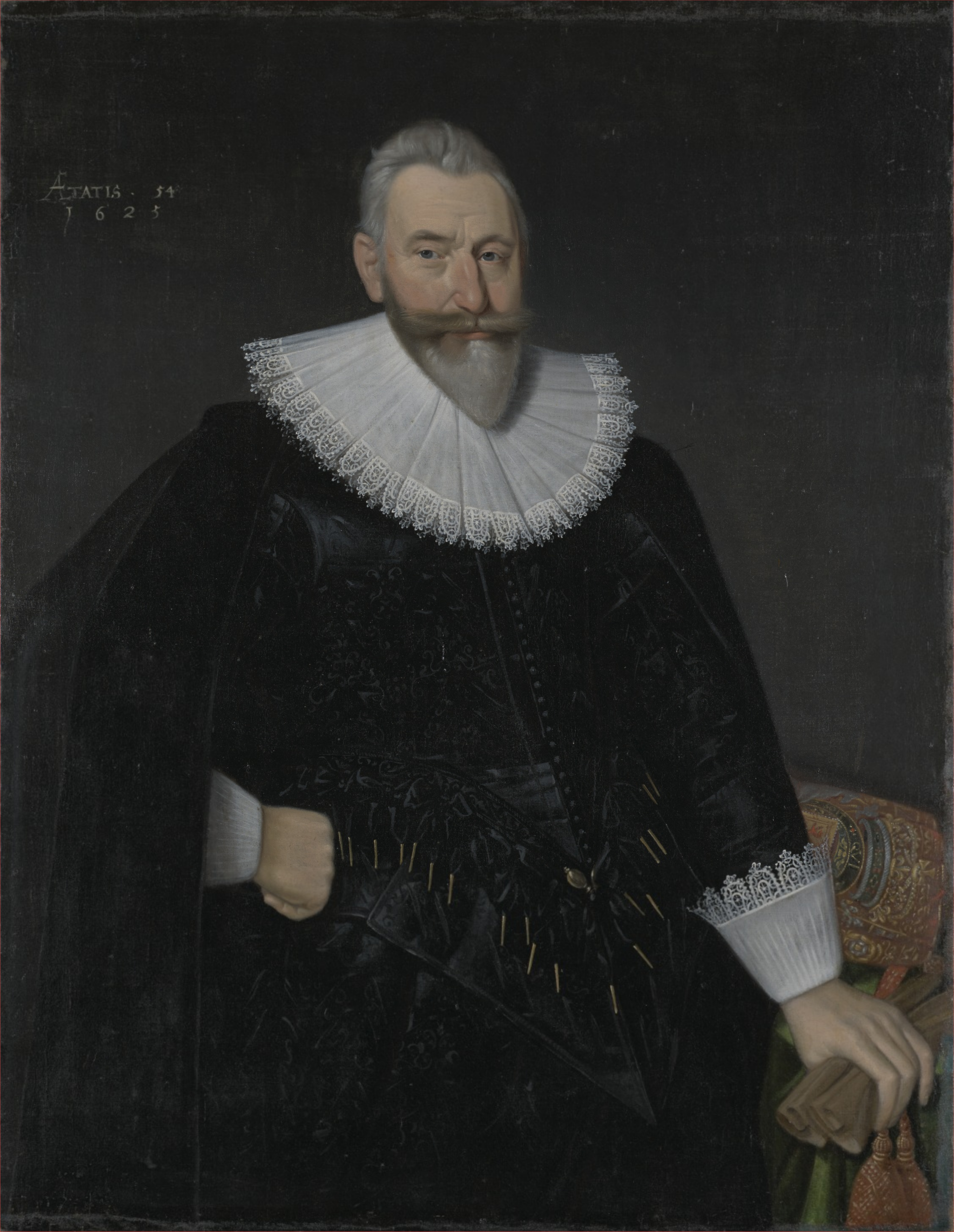
- The Earl of Kinnoull, painted by Adam de Colone, 1625

Lord Chancellor of Scotland
- In office 16 May 1622 – 16 December 1634
- Monarchs: James VI; Charles I

Personal details
- Born: 1570
- Died: 16 December 1634 (aged 64) London, England
- Spouse: Margaret Halyburton (m. 1595)
- Children: 3, including George

Coat of arms of the Earls of Kinnoull

Sir George Hay, 1st Earl of Kinnoull, PC (1570 – 16 December 1634) was 6th Lord Kinfauns from 1621 to 1627, then 1st Viscount of Dupplin from 1627 before advancing to the earldom in 1633. He was a Scottish nobleman and political official.

== Biography ==
He was the second son of Peter Hay 4th of Megginch and Margaret, daughter of Patrick Ogilvy of Inchmartin. No date is recorded for his birth, but he was baptised 4 December 1570.

Around 1588, Hay entered Scottish College at Douai, where he studied under his uncle Edmund Hay until 1596. He was initially introduced to court by his cousin the Earl of Carlisle. Hay served as a Gentleman of the Bedchamber from 1596. On 18 February 1598, he was granted the Carthusian priory of Perth and a seat in Parliament, but, finding the rents too low to live on, he returned the peerage.

On 15 November 1600, he was given land for his services to the King on the occasion of the Gowrie conspiracy. He was knighted sometime before 18 October 1607, when he first appeared in the records as Sir George Hay. He was appointed Lord Clerk Register and a member of the Privy Council on 26 March 1616. He was instrumental in the passage of the Five Articles of Perth in 1618.

In 1619 the Privy Council of Scotland wrote to King James to defend Hay's interest in glass and iron manufacture in Scotland, arguing that Scottish glass should be sold in England without custom duties.

In 1621 he was infeft of the lands and Lordship of Kinfauns, confirmed by crown charter in records of parliament.

On 9 July 1622, he was appointed Lord Chancellor and Keeper of the Great Seal. On 19 July 1625, the lands of the Earldom of Orkney were transferred to him.

On 7 May 1625, he was at the funeral of James VI and I in London, and was sworn in as a member of the Scottish Privy Council of Charles I. He was created Viscount of Dupplin and Lord Hay of Kinfauns on 4 May 1627.

In September 1629 he was a collector of tax in Scotland. He discovered that Marie Stewart, "My Lady Marre", had obtained a chest containing important documents concerning taxes which had been kept by the late Archibald Primrose, clerk of taxations. She made some difficulties about handing over the documents, and was away from Edinburgh in the north of Scotland.

On 25 May 1633, he was created the Earl of Kinnoull on the occasion of the King Charles' coronation in Scotland.

He resisted the king's regulations for lords of session (1626), and upheld precedency over archbishop of St Andrews.

In 1626, he began to suffer from old age. It was noted that he was absent from the Council in July 1626 as he was suffering from "the pain of the gute" very severely. Two years later his "known infirmitie and seekenesse" was noted.

He died of apoplexy in London and was buried in Kinnoull Parish Church, in which a monument was erected in his honour.

== Marriage ==
He married Margaret, daughter of Sir James Halyburton of Pitcur manor, Kettins parish, on 15 November 1595. They had three children:

1. Sir Peter Hay (died decessit vita patris at Kinfauns, 1621), unmarried
2. George Hay (d. 1644)
3. Lady Margaret, married to Alexander Lindsay, 2nd Lord Spynie

Political offices
Preceded by The Earl of Dunfermline	Lord Chancellor of Scotland; 1622–1634	Succeeded by John Spottiswoode
Peerage of Scotland
New creation	Earl of Kinnoull; 1633–1634	Succeeded by George Hay
New creation	Viscount Dupplin; 1627–1634	Succeeded by George Hay
Preceded by John Lindsay	Lord Kinfauns; 1622–1634	Succeeded by George Hay
