= List of listed buildings in Kinfauns, Perth and Kinross =

This is a list of listed buildings in the parish of Kinfauns in Perth and Kinross, Scotland.

== List ==
Name	Location	Date listed	Geo-coordinates	Notes	Category	LB number	Image
Kinfauns Churchyard			56°23′07″N 3°21′07″W		C(S)	11996	Upload Photo
Glencarse House			56°23′21″N 3°18′17″W		C(S)	11957	Upload Photo
Castle Farm			56°23′23″N 3°22′58″W		B	11965	Upload Photo
Kinfauns Parish Church			56°23′08″N 3°21′08″W		C(S)	11995	Upload another image
Kinfauns House (Former Manse)			56°23′07″N 3°20′48″W		C(S)	11950	Upload Photo
Glencarse House, Dovecot At Steading			56°23′25″N 3°18′09″W		C(S)	11958	Upload Photo
Glencarse House, West Lodge And Gatepiers			56°23′14″N 3°18′28″W		B	11952	Upload another image
Kinfauns Castle Walled Garden Gateway And Stairs At N. Wall			56°23′10″N 3°22′31″W		C(S)	11954	Upload Photo
Bowes Lodge			56°23′07″N 3°22′48″W		C(S)	11960	Upload Photo
Home Farm, Kinfauns Castle, Farmhouse			56°23′11″N 3°22′45″W		B	11961	Upload Photo
Seggieden Ice House			56°22′41″N 3°20′56″W		C(S)	11951	Upload another image
Kinfauns Schoolhouse			56°23′06″N 3°21′00″W		B	11997	Upload Photo
Kinfauns Castle			56°23′18″N 3°22′39″W		A	11955	Upload another image See more images
Binnhill Tower			56°23′18″N 3°22′01″W		B	11956	Upload another image See more images
Kinnoull Tower, Kinnoull Hill			56°23′20″N 3°23′46″W		B	11963	Upload another image See more images
Glendoick House, Walled Garden, Sundial Chair			56°23′49″N 3°17′16″W		B	11967	Upload Photo
Home Farm, Dairy Kinfauns Castle			56°23′10″N 3°22′46″W		B	13794	Upload Photo
Tofthill Farm House			56°22′30″N 3°19′57″W		C(S)	11953	Upload Photo
West Lodge, Kinfauns Castle, Gatepiers			56°22′59″N 3°24′34″W		C(S)	11962	Upload another image
Rockdale Cottage			56°23′17″N 3°23′28″W		B	11964	Upload Photo
Glendoick House, Walled Garden			56°23′50″N 3°17′15″W		C(S)	13795	Upload Photo
Glencarse All Saints Episcopal Church			56°22′49″N 3°18′09″W		C(S)	11968	Upload another image See more images
Glendoick House			56°23′53″N 3°17′08″W		A	11966	Upload another image
Kinfauns Old Parish Church			56°23′07″N 3°21′04″W		B	13796	Upload Photo
Glencarse House, Sundial Within Walled Garden			56°23′26″N 3°18′12″W		B	11959	Upload Photo

== Key ==
The scheme for classifying buildings in Scotland is:

- Category A: "buildings of national or international importance, either architectural or historic; or fine, little-altered examples of some particular period, style or building type."
- Category B: "buildings of regional or more than local importance; or major examples of some particular period, style or building type, which may have been altered."
- Category C: "buildings of local importance; lesser examples of any period, style, or building type, as originally constructed or moderately altered; and simple traditional buildings which group well with other listed buildings."

In March 2016 there were 47,288 listed buildings in Scotland. Of these, 8% were Category A, and 50% were Category B, with the remaining 42% being Category C.
