= Kinfauns Castle West Lodge =

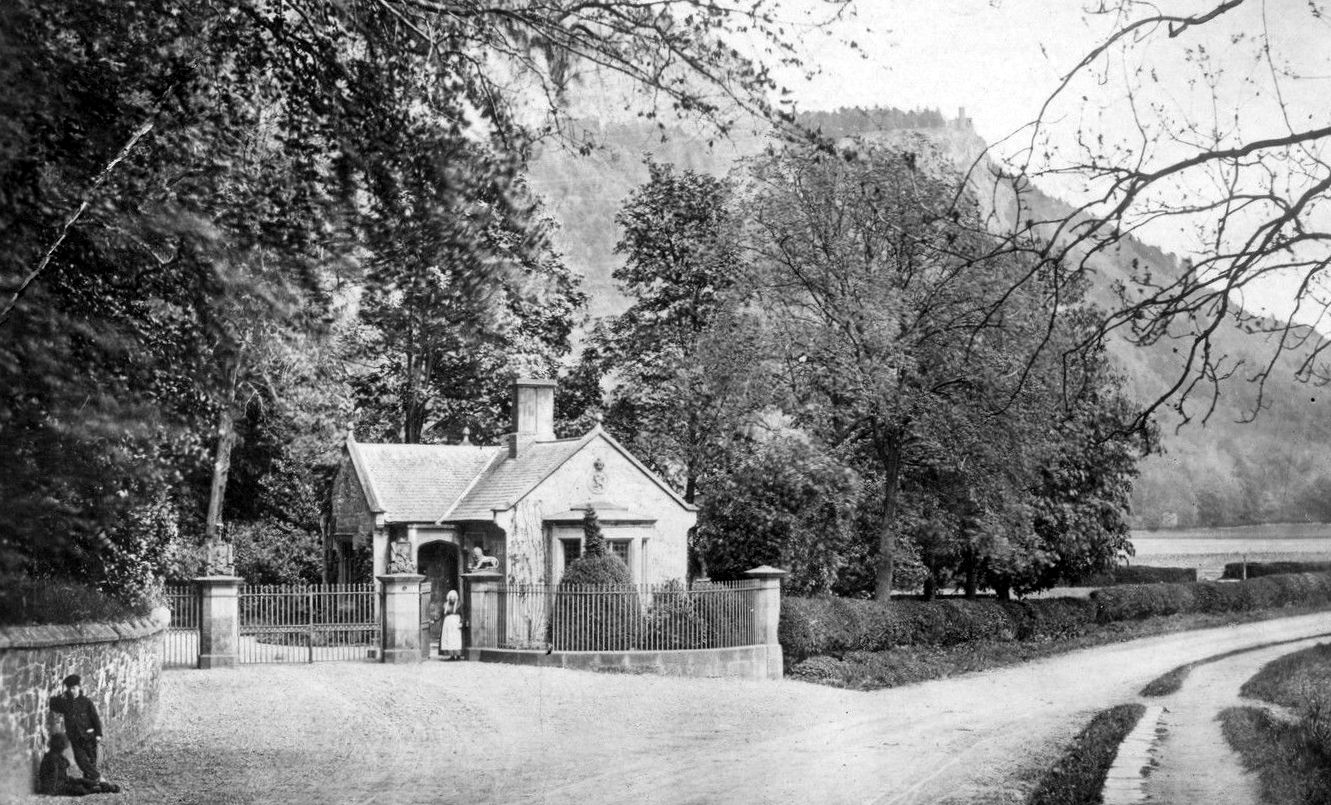
- The gatehouse, c. 1830, with Kinnoull Hill and Kinnoull Tower above to the northeast. Two of the four gate piers have since been removed

- Location of Kinfauns Castle West Lodge in Perth and Kinross
- 56.3829°N 3.4095°W
- Location: Kinfauns, near Perth, Scotland

History
- Built: 1826 (200 years ago)
- Built for: Lord Gray

Site notes
- Architect: Robert Smirke

Listed Building – Category C(S)
- Designated: 9 June 1981
- Reference no.: LB11962

Kinfauns Castle West Lodge, also known as Rockdale Cottage, is a 19th-century gatehouse in Kinfauns, Perth and Kinross, Scotland. A Category C listed building, it was completed in 1826, the work of Robert Smirke.

The gatehouse originally had four octagonal gate piers (capped by a pair of draped shields at centre and a pair of lions on the outermost piers) across its driveway immediately to the west, but one of each has since been removed, along with other alterations having been made to the building itself. The sculptor of the pier heads was John Cochrane.
