= Manse of Kinfauns =

- Kinfauns House
- Location within Perth and Kinross
- 56.385285°N 3.346666°W
- Location: Kinfauns, Perth and Kinross, Scotland

History
- Built: 1791 (235 years ago)

Site notes
- Architect: William Macdonald Mackenzie (1840 addition)

Listed Building – Category C(S)
- Designated: 9 June 1981
- Reference no.: LB11950

The Manse of Kinfauns (also known as Kinfauns House) is an historic building located in Kinfauns, Perth and Kinross, Scotland. It was built in 1791 and is now a Category C listed building, It was formerly the manse for the nearby Kinfauns Parish Church.

An addition, to the east, in 1840 was the work of William Macdonald Mackenzie, Perth's City Architect, who was born in St Martins, 4.5 miles (7.2 km) to the north.

The Church of Scotland sold the property in 1958 to a private owner who remained there for 45 years. It was sold again in 2003.

Loch Kaitre formerly occupied the site beside the manse. It was still present in 1838, but in the mid-19th century, a sinkhole appeared and the manse fell in, witnessed by the minister, who had just left his home en route to the church. The loch remained for a few generations, before being drained by a tenant later in the century for agricultural use of the land beneath it. It is possible Mackenzie's work in 1840 was actually repair work after this episode.

== See also ==
- List of listed buildings in Kinfauns, Perth and Kinross
