= Francis Gray, 14th Lord Gray =

Scottish peer, politician and soldier

Francis Gray, 14th Lord Gray FRS FRSE PSAS (1 September 1765 – 20 August 1842) was a Scottish peer, politician and soldier.

== Life ==
He was born in Edinburgh on 1 September 1765 the youngest of twelve children to John Gray, 11th Lord Gray and his wife Margaret Blair of Kinfauns (1720–1790). The family had a house at Adams Square in Edinburgh and a family seat in the north of Scotland at Fowlis Castle.

He served in the Breadalbane Fencibles, a local militia, gaining the rank of Major by 1793.

In 1807, following the death of his older brother, William John Gray, 13th Lord Gray he succeeded to the peerage. From 1807 to 1810 he served as Deputy Postmaster General in Scotland, being succeeded by James Sinclair, 12th Earl of Caithness. He sat in the House of Lords 1812 to 1841.

In 1812 he was elected a Fellow of the Royal Society of Edinburgh. His proposers were Ninian Imrie, John Playfair and Sir John Leslie. He served as the Society's vice president from 1815 to 1823. In 1816 he was elected a Fellow of the Royal Society of London. From 1819 to 1823 he served as president of the Society of Antiquaries of Scotland.

In 1822 he commissioned Robert Smirke to build Kinfauns Castle. In 1825 he further commissioned William Trotter to execute suites of furniture for the castle. The building was ready for occupation in 1826. He commissioned Binnhill Tower in 1839.

He died on 20 August 1842 and is buried in the family vault at Fowlis.

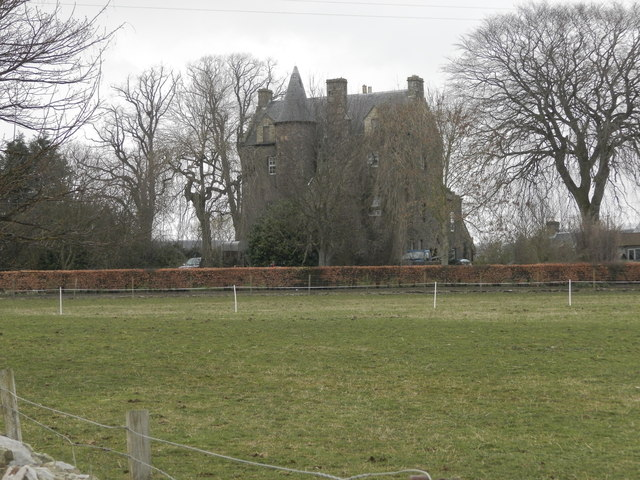
Fowlis Castle

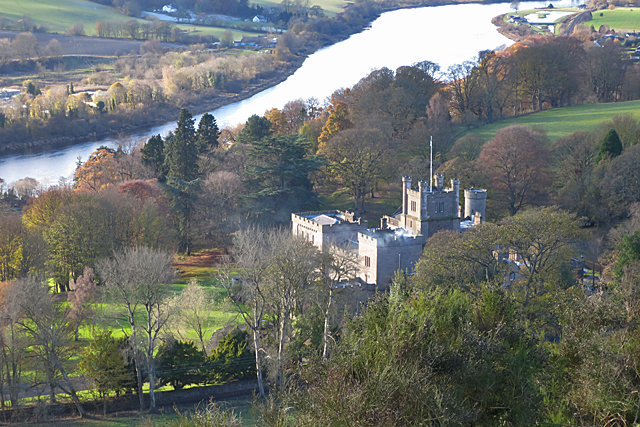
Kinfauns Castle

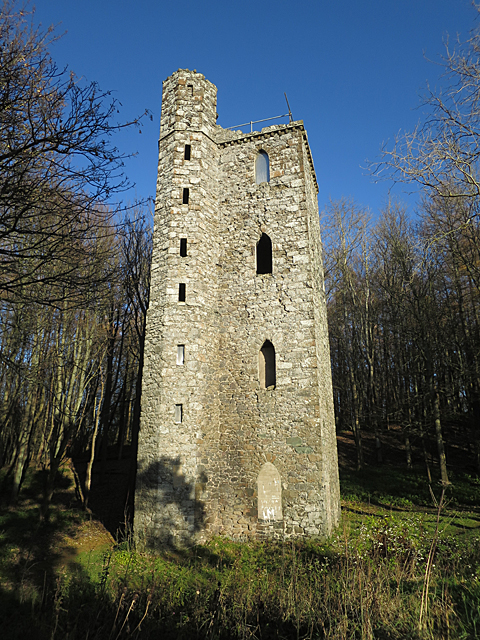
Binnhill Tower

== Family ==
In 1794 he married Mary Ann Johnston, daughter of Lt Col James Johnston. They had three daughters (one of whom, Jane Anne, was first wife of the soldier Charles Philip de Ainslie) and one son, John Gray, 15th Lord Gray who succeeded to the baronetcy.

Peerage of Scotland
| Preceded by William John Gray | Lord Gray; 1807–1842 | Succeeded by John Gray |
| Preceded by William John Gray | Lord Kinfauns; 1808-1842 | Succeeded by John Gray |
