= Lord Kinfauns =

Title of nobility and baronial rank

Lord Kinfauns is a title of nobility and baronial rank of Scotland held by the Irish Commane family, with genealogy in Burke’s Peerage. The lordship was granted in 1487 by King James III of Scots and in 1608 by King James I of Ireland. As recorded in crown charter domino Kynfawnis lord Kinfauns, but possibly created earlier for Sir Thomas Charteris circa 1340.

He was a native frenchman, and of an ancient family in that country. According to legend, he killed a French nobleman in the presence of the King. Although he escaped, he was refused a pardon. He became a pirate and later, through Sir William Wallace’s intervention, he received a pardon and knighthood from the French King. Charteris became a loyal ally of Wallace and supported King Robert the Bruce in his campaign for the Scottish crown and against the English, earning the title for his bravery.

When the 6th Lord Kinfauns was promoted to Earl of Kinnoull, his son and heir was styled Lord Kinfauns his father's title as a courtesy, his son being a military commander on the continent he is referenced between 1621 and 1634 with this title in many documents, before he succeeded as 2nd Earl of Kinnoull and 7th Lord Kinfauns.

In 2024, Fergus, 26th Lord Kinfauns succeeded John, 25th Lord Kinfauns, the Earl of Moray.

The family seat is Newhall House, a historic estate in County Clare, Ireland. Historically, the seat was Kinfauns Castle.

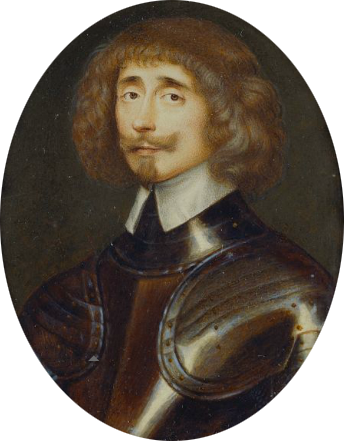
7th Lord Kinfauns

== Kinfauns origin ==
The village of Kinfauns likely derives its name from the Gaelic ceann-fauns, which can mean "head of the slope," referencing the nearby Sidlaw Hills.

The spot is hallowed by memories of Wallace and Bruce during the long struggle for Scottish sovereignty; and a popular legend survives, which declares that the first lord of Kinfauns was a noble French warrior, who received these broad acres as a reward for his valorous aid to the Bruce against the English invader. It is believed that his sword, dating back over 700 years, remains within Kinfauns Castle.

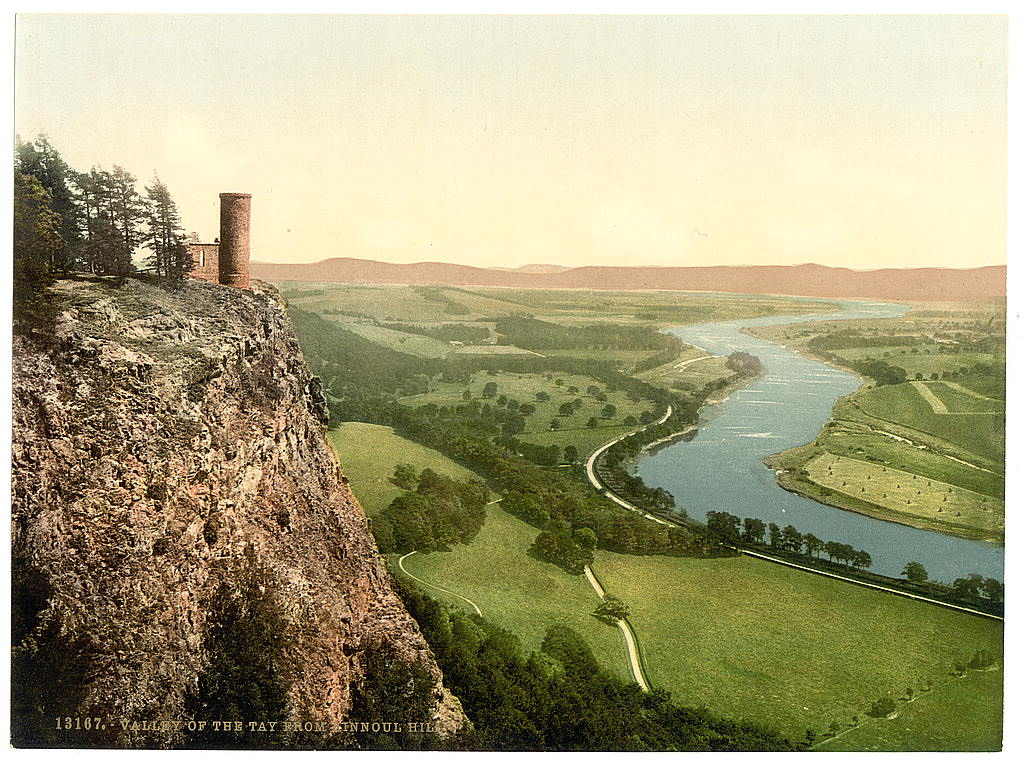
River Tay. A cave called the Dragon Hole on Kinnoull Hill in Kinfauns is thought to have occasionally sheltered Sir Wallace Wallace.

== History of the lordship ==
According to legend, the title was granted in the 14th century to the Charteris family. Although no original charters from that period survive, in 1487 the title is officially recorded for Sir Thomas Charteris in the Great Seal by King James III.

The Charteris family held the lordship through the late medieval and early modern periods. Sir John Charteris, second lord, was murdered in 1552 during a long-running feud with the Ruthven family. The third lord, also called Sir John Charteris, is quoted in contemporary narrative as:

“the Queen’s Lieutenant here, the Lord Kinfauns, [who] refused to surrender,”

reflecting his role in resisting a siege during the conflict between supporters of Mary, Queen of Scots, and the Regent’s party. With his wife Janet Chisholm, they adopted as heir Harry Lindsay, brother of the Earl of Crawford. Lindsay took the Charteris name, succeeded as fourth lord, and later inherited the title 13th Earl of Crawford. His son, Sir John Lindsay, the fifth lord, inherited his estates as a wedding present but later tragically predeceased his father.

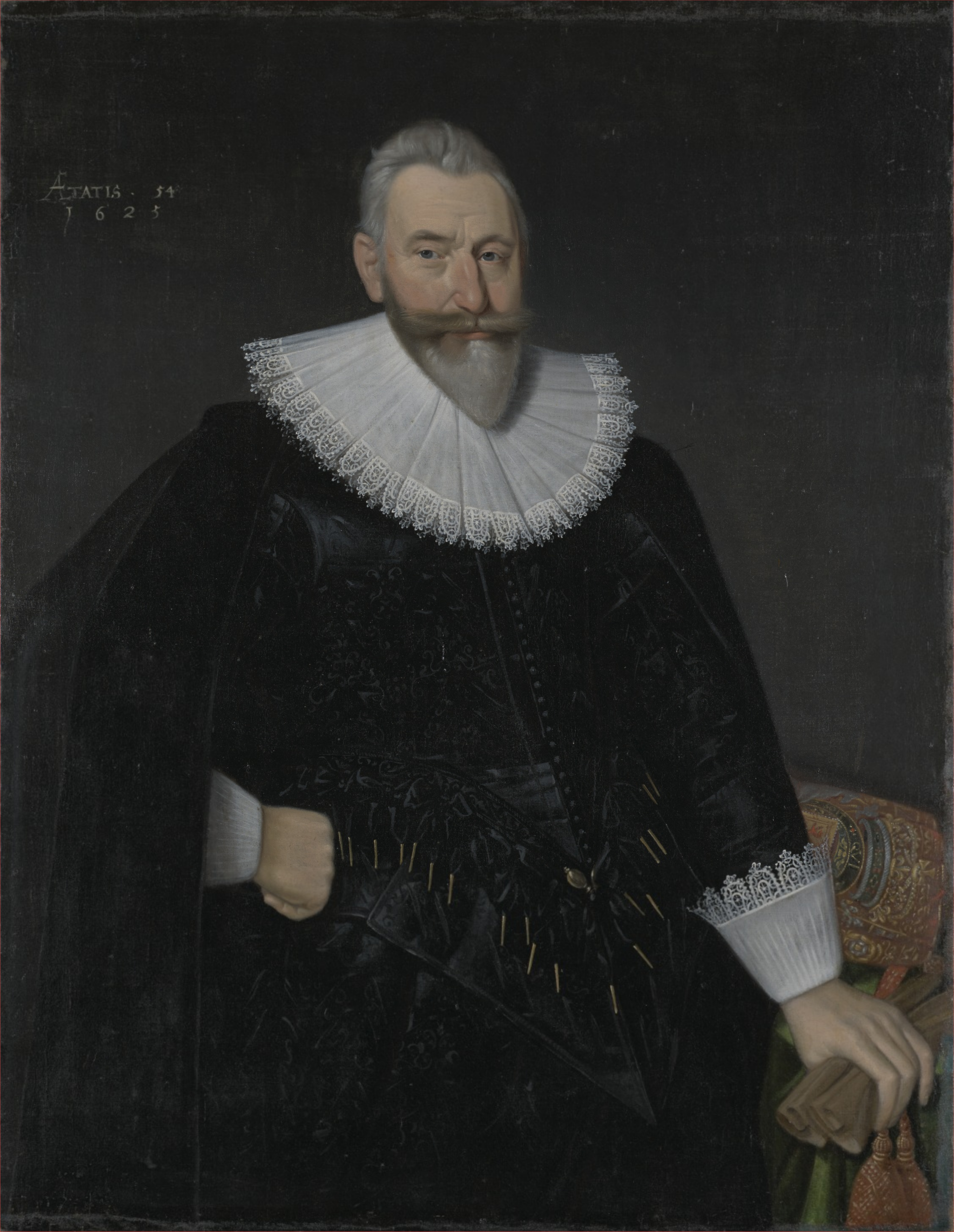
6th Lord Kinfauns, later the Earl of Kinnoull, painted by Adam de Colone, 1625

In the 17th century, ninth lord, Sir William Blair, was created 1st Baronet of Kinfauns, but having no sons, the baronetcy became extinct on his death. The lordship passed to his eldest daughter, Ann Blair, who, with her husband Alexander Carnegie, secured a Crown charter in 1673 confirming their rights. Their son, Alexander Blair Carnegie, eleventh lord, was later taken to court by his wife in the case:

Lady Kinfauns v. Lord Kinfauns (19 July 1711)

in which he was found liable for the expense of a journey to Bath that she had undertaken against his wishes.

Their daughter Margaret Blair, heiress of Kinfauns, married John, 11th Lord Gray, in the early 18th century, bringing the lordship into the Gray family and merging the title with the Lords Gray. All female holders chose to be styled as Baroness of Kinfauns in reference to the baronial lordship, with the exception of two Lady Grays who styled themselves Baroness Gray of Gray and Kinfauns to emphasise both titles.

By the 1800s, the title passed to a cousin and was long held as a subsidiary title by the Earls of Moray—one of the original seven earldoms of Scotland, known in the 10th century as mormaers (Gaelic for earl).

=== In popular culture ===
The lordship is referenced in Walter Scott’s novel The Fair Maid of Perth (1828), in which Sir Patrick Charteris is described as Baron of Kinfauns and as provost of Perth. This depiction does not reflect the historical lineage of the title.

== Duties and Privileges ==
The title historically held the right to a seat in the pre-Union Parliament, as part of the ancient Three Estates — among the barons and nobility of the Second Estate.

== Mytho-historical early lords of Kinfauns ==
- Sir Thomas de Longueville later Charteris, (probably) first lord of Kinfauns (circa 1340)
- Sir William Charteris (circa 1378)
- Sir Thomas Charteris of Cagnor (circa 1408)
- Sir William Charteris of Cagnor (circa 1443)

== Lords Kinfauns (1487) ==
- 1st Lord Kinfauns, Sir Thomas Charteris (1487 recorded in Great Seal)
- 2nd Lord Kinfauns, Sir John Charteris, provost of Perth (1524)
- 3rd Lord Kinfauns, Sir John Chartertis (1552)
- -- George Charteris heir-apparent predeceased father so they adopted:

Earls of Crawford

- 4th Lord Kinfauns, Sir Harry Charteris later Lindsay, 13th Earl of Crawford (1601), adopted by John Charteris
- 5th Lord Kinfauns, Sir John Lindsay (1608) son predeceased father

Earls of Kinnoull

- 6th Lord Kinfauns, 1st Earl of Kinnoull, Sir George Hay, created Lord Hay 1627 and Earl of Kinnoull 1633 (1621)
- 7th Lord Kinfauns, 2nd Earl of Kinnoul, Sir George Hay (1634)

Blair and Carnegie Lordship

- 8th Lord Kinfauns, Sir Alexander Blair of Balthayock (1647)
- 9th Lord Kinfauns, Sir William Blair of Kinfauns, 1st Baronet (1654)
- 10th Baroness of Kinfauns, Ann Blair (1673) married Hon. Alexander Carnegie, son of the Earl of Northesk
- 11th Lord Kinfauns, Alexander Blair Carnegie (1695)

Lords Gray of Gray

- 12th Lord Kinfauns, 11th Lord Gray, John Gray (1741), married Margaret daughter of Blair
- 13th Lord Kinfauns, 12th Lord Gray, Charles Gray (1782)
- 14th Lord Kinfauns, 13th Lord Gray, William John Gray (1786)
- 15th Lord Kinfauns, 14th Lord Gray, Sir Francis Gray (1808)
- 16th Lord Kinfauns, 15th Lord Gray, John Gray (1843)
- 17th Baroness of Kinfauns, 16th Lady Gray, Madeline Gray (1868), sister of John
- 18th Baroness of Kinfauns, 17th Lady Gray, Margaret Murray (1869), niece of Madeline

Earls of Moray

- 19th Lord Kinfauns, 15th Earl of Moray, Edmund Arhibald Stuart Gray (1878), cousin from 11th Lord Gray
- 20th Lord Kinfauns, 16th Earl of Moray, Lieut. Col Francis James Stuart (1896)
- 21st Lord Kinfauns, 17th Earl of Moray, Morton Gray Stuart (1901)
- 22nd Lord Kinfauns, 18th Earl of Moray, Francis Douglas Stuart (1930)
- 23rd Lord Kinfauns, 19th Earl of Moray, Archibald John Morton (1943)
- 24th Lord Kinfauns, 20th Earl of Moray, Douglas John Stuart (1974)
- 25th Lord Kinfauns, 21st Earl of Moray, John Douglas Stuart (2011)

== Present holder ==
The 26th lord is Fergus Commane, Lord Kinfauns (born 1953, Newhall, County Clare, Ireland), keeper of the hereditary office of admiralty of the Water of Tay. Burke’s Peerage describes him as an Irish clan chief, though there is no official record of Irish clans or their chiefs. His wife is Maria, Lady Kinfauns. Their son, Antoin Commane, is heir apparent.

== Sources ==
- Grant, Alexander, The Development of the Scottish Peerage, published in the Scottish Historical Review, 1978.
- Gray, John. The Grays of Kinfauns: Their Place in Scottish History (Perth: Local Historical Society, 1899).
- Lords of the North: The Rise of the Charteris Family (Aberdeen: Aberdeen University Press, 1921).
- Peskett, H. Consultant Editor for Scotland, Burke's Peerage, Baronetage & Knightage. Burke's Peerage (107th Ed.), 'East Lothian Life', Autumn 2003, p. 17
- Provosts and Magistrates of Perth: 1300-1700, J. B. Charteris (Perth: History Press, 1967).
- Szechi, Daniel. 1715: the great Jacobite rebellion (Yale University Press, 2006)
- A. MacKenzie: The Hays of Perthshire: Lords of Kinnoull and Kinfauns (Perth: Perthshire Historical Society, 1978).
- Wallace, William. The Pirate and the Patriot: Kinfauns and Thomas de Longueville (Perth: Gowrie Publications, 1857).
