= William Macdonald Mackenzie =

Scottish architect (1797–1856)

William Mackenzie
- Born: William Macdonald Mackenzie; 20 July 1797; St Martins, Perth and Kinross, Scotland
- Died: 25 February 1856 (aged 58); Perth, Scotland
- Occupation: Architect

William Macdonald Mackenzie (20 July 1797 – 25 February 1856) was a Scottish architect, prominent in the first half of the 19th century. He designed several notable buildings in Scotland, mostly manses and church buildings.

== Early life ==
Mackenzie was born in 1797 in St Martins, a parish about 4.3 miles (6.9 km) north-northeast of Perth, the second son of Alexander Mackenzie, an architect-builder, and his wife Janet Davidson. (In 1806, his father was listed as the owner of the land on which the Witches' Stone stands. The stone marks the location where Macbeth meets with two witches in William Shakespeare's tragedy.)

His four younger brothers were John (born 1799), Alexander (born 1803), David (born 1805) and Thomas (born 1814). He also had a sister, Matilda. His father died in 1827.

== Career ==
Mackenzie practiced out of 14 Charlotte Street in 1837 and 5 George Street in 1841. From 1848, however, he appears to have been based at his house on Byerswell (now Bowerswell) Road in Bridgend.

He was Perth's City Architect until his death, after which he was succeeded by Andrew Heiton and his father.

=== Selected notable works ===
- St Leonard's Bank, Perth (plots laid out for feuing, 1828)
- 20 Charlotte Street, Perth (1830)
- St Leonard's Parish Church, Perth (1836)
- A. K. Bell Library (original central section and lodge), Perth (1836–1838)
- Binnhill Tower, Kinfauns (1839)
- Manse of Kinfauns (1840)
- Clunie Church (1840)
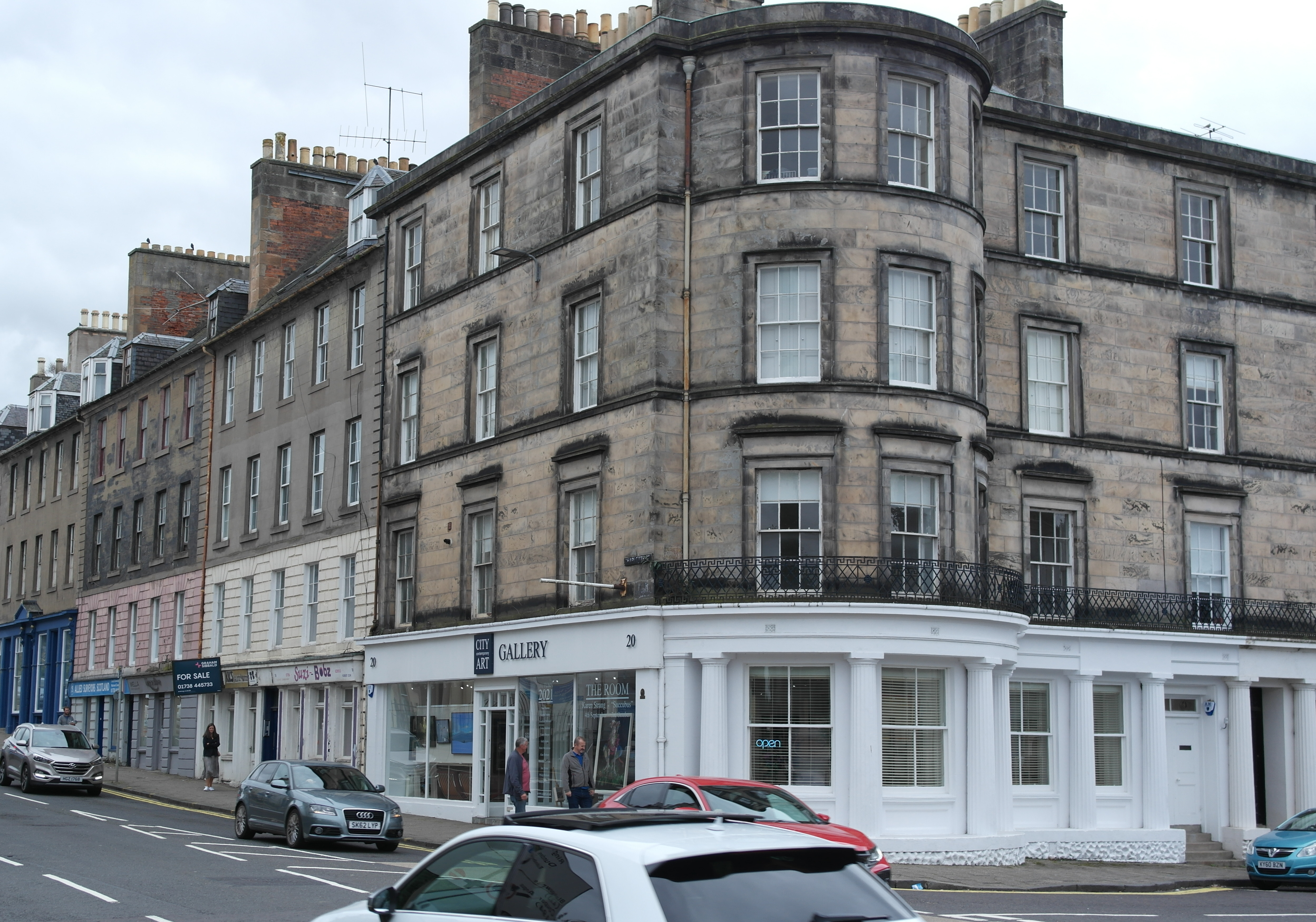
20 Charlotte Street

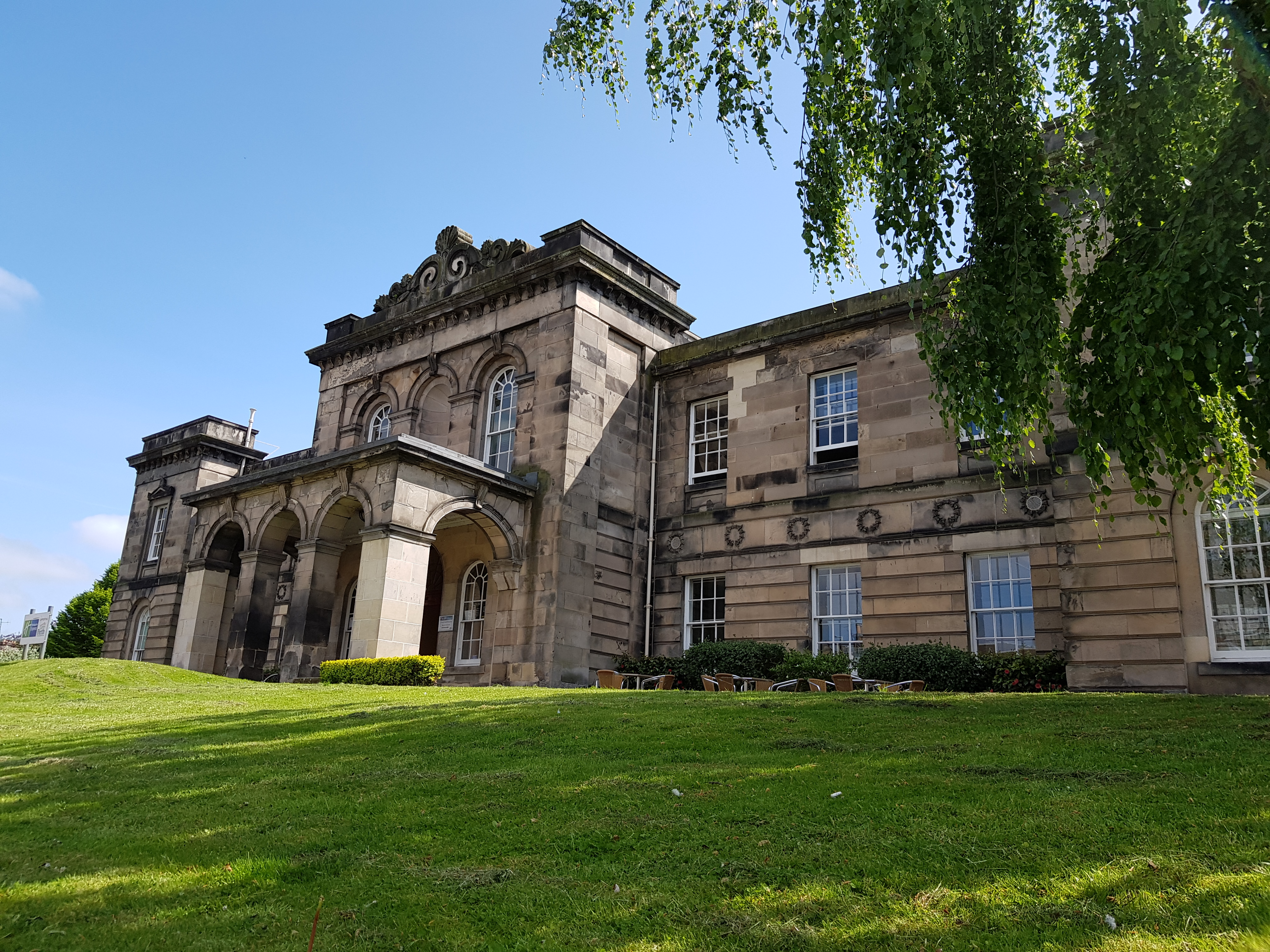
A.K. Bell Library

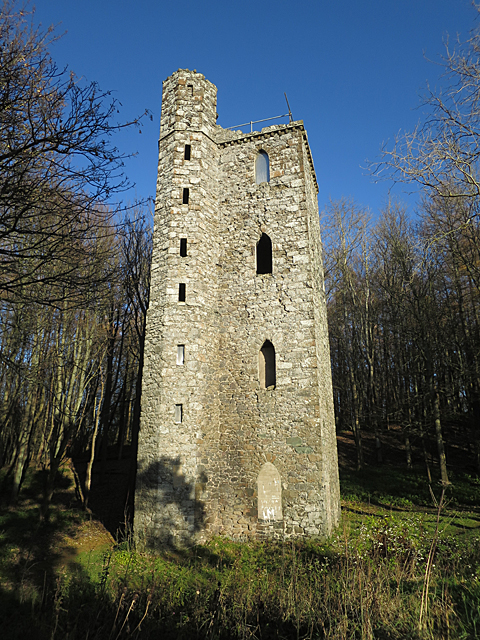
Binnhill Tower

== Personal life ==
Mackenzie married Jean Davidson, his cousin, around 1824. They had at five children: three sons and two daughters. Second son William (1826–1864), trained as a civil engineer. His other children were David, James and Alexander, and his daughters Jane Ann and Jessie.

He died on 25 February, 1856, aged 58, and was buried in Perth's Greyfriars Burial Ground. His family moved to Liverpool after his death, then returned to Scotland and lived in Dundee with Mackenzie's brother David.
