= Patrick Gray, 5th Lord Gray =

Scottish landowner

Patrick Gray, 5th Lord Gray (d. 1608), was a Scottish landowner.

He was a son of Patrick Gray, 4th Lord Gray and Marion Ogilvy. He became Lord High Sheriff of Forfar. However he was unable to join in public life. James VI invited him to the baptism of Prince Henry in August 1594. In 1596, his son Patrick, Master of Gray, wrote that his father had been summoned to the court at Linlithgow Palace but everyone known of his "inhabilitie".

On Monday 3 May 1598 the brother of Anne of Denmark, the Duke of Holstein, came to Gray's castle at Fowlis for dinner during his progress. Lord Gray was ordered by James VI of Scotland to meet him and escort him for six miles.

== Family ==
Lord Gray married Barbara Ruthven, daughter of William Ruthven, 2nd Lord Ruthven. Their children included:

- Patrick, Master of Gray and 6th Lord Gray
- James Gray, who was gentleman of the bedchamber to king James VI. In 1591 James stole a horse belonging to James VI, and in 1593 assaulted and abducted Catherine Carnegie daughter of John Carnegie from the house of Robert Jousie in Edinburgh.
- Gilbert Gray.
- Robert Gray of Millhill.
- Andrew Gray, attended the embassy to England in 1583 and was involved with William Keith of Delny in a fight near Durham.
- Mary Gray, married to David Seton of Parbroath, comptroller of Scotland.
- Helen Gray, married to Sir Hugh Maxwell of Tealing.
- Isabel Gray, married, firstly to David Strachan of Carmelie, and secondly, to Sir Alexander Falconer of Halkerton.
- Elizabeth Gray, married to William Gordon of Abergeldie.

Preceded by Patrick Gray, 4th Lord Gray	Lord Gray; 1584–1608	Succeeded by Patrick Gray, 6th Lord Gray
