= Binnhill Tower =

Tower in Scotland

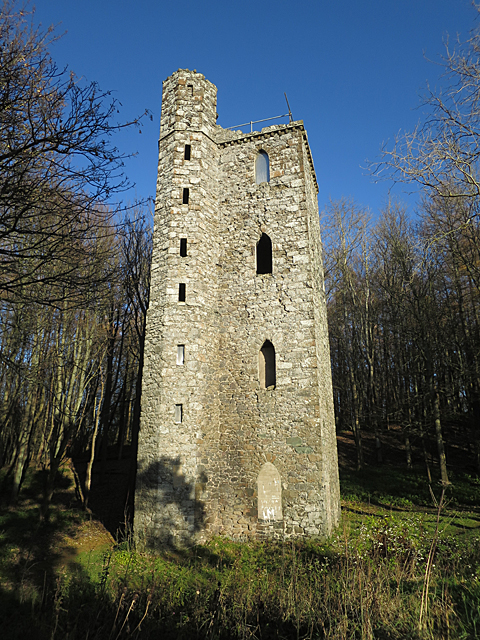
- The tower in 2017
- Interactive map of the Binnhill Tower area

General information
- Architectural style: Gothic
- Location: Kinfauns, Perth and Kinross, Scotland
- Coordinates: 56.388405°N 3.3670716°W
- Completed: 1813 (213 years ago)
- Client: Francis Gray, 14th Lord Gray

Technical details
- Floor count: 4

Binnhill Tower is a stone-built tower in the Gothic style, located in Kinfauns, Perth and Kinross, Scotland. A Category B listed structure, the tower stands on Binn Hill, in the centre of Binn Wood, about 0.4 miles (0.64 km) east of Kinfauns Castle. It was designed to be an observatory for Francis Gray, 14th Lord Gray, to view the River Tay and the Lomond Hills, and was completed in 1813.

The tower cannot by accessed by road and can only be reached on foot.

== History ==
Binnhill Tower was constructed in 1813 on the grounds of Kinfauns Castle to be an observatory for the castle's owner Francis Gray, 14th Lord Gray and his guests to see panoramic views of the River Tay and the Lomond Hills.

During the late 20th century, Binnhill Tower fell into disrepair and the roof rotted away, leaving it roofless. The tower was also frequently vandalised, with a fire being set against the doorway in the 1990s. It was placed on the Buildings at Risk Register for Scotland in 1997, and is considered by them to be in poor condition and at moderate risk. It is a Category B listed structure.

The tower was put on the market in 2015, with an asking price of £28,000, and sold in September of that year. It was listed for sale again, in March 2022, when it was noted that the tower had lapsed planning permission to be restored.

== Architecture ==
It is a square tower that was designed in a Gothic style and has four-storeys. The entrance to the tower is an arched doorway on the ground floor, leading to an octagonal spiral staircase to the first floor.

== Gallery ==
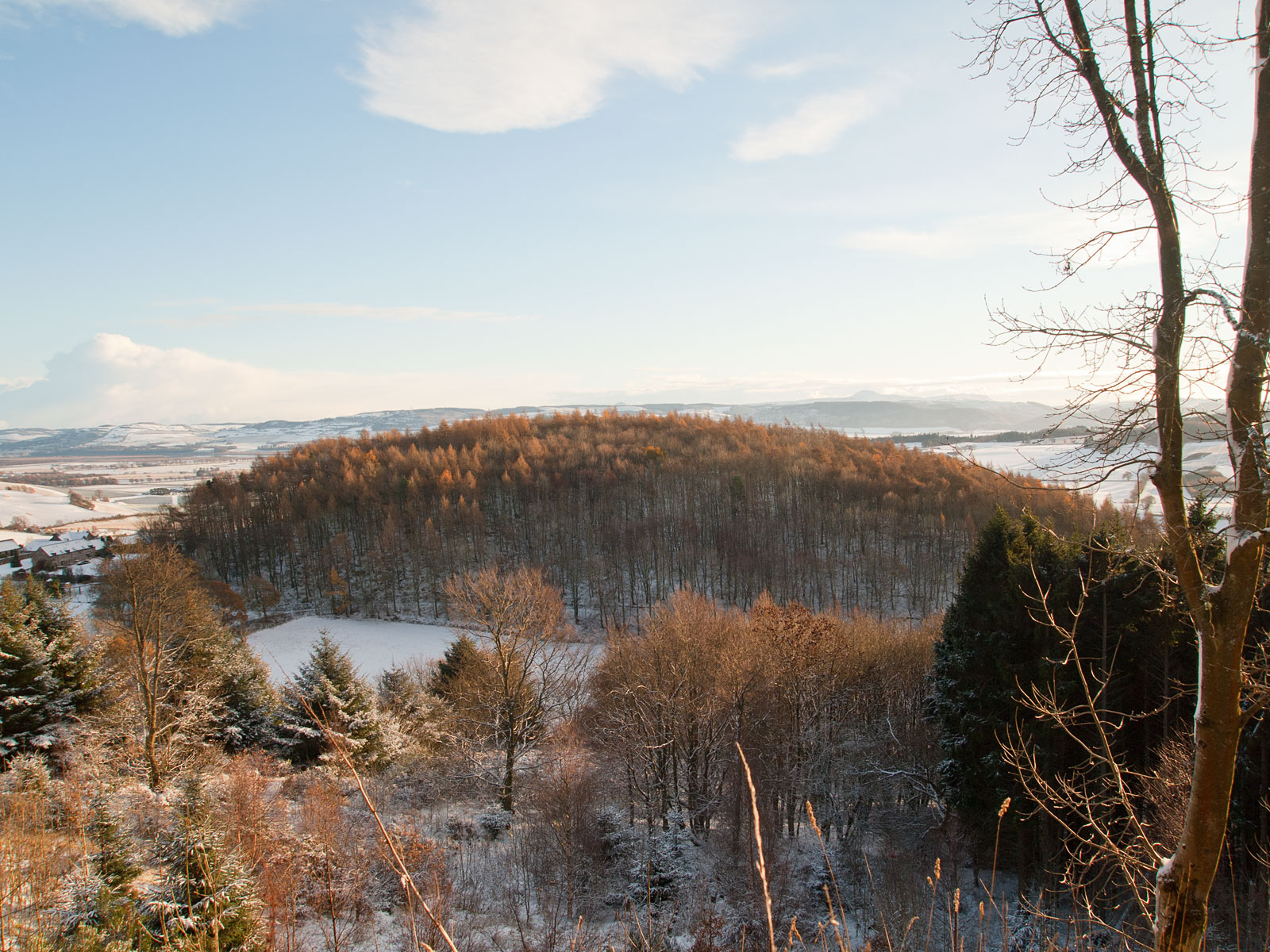
Binn Wood, looking south from Deuchny Wood
