= William John Gray, 13th Lord Gray =

Scottish nobleman and soldier

William John Gray, 13th Lord Gray (1754–1807), was a Scottish nobleman and soldier.

He was the son of John Gray, 11th Lord Gray, and Margaret Blair. He served as a cornet in the 2nd Dragoons (Royal Scots Greys), and was made lieutenant in 1776. He was promoted to captain in the 15th Dragoons in 1779, and retired in 1788.

He succeeded his brother as Lord Gray in 1786. On 12 December 1807 he committed suicide at his home, Kinfauns Castle in Perthshire. His suicide is attributed to a love disappointment. He was unmarried, and was succeeded by his brother.

Peerage of Scotland
Preceded by Charles Gray	Lord Gray; 1786–1807	Succeeded by Francis Gray
Preceded by Charles Gray	Lord Kinfauns; 1786–1807	Succeeded by Francis Gray
