= Patrick Gray, 6th Lord Gray =

Scottish nobleman and politician

Patrick Gray, 6th Lord Gray (died 1612), known most of his life as Patrick, Master of Gray, was a Scottish nobleman and politician during the reigns of Mary, Queen of Scots and James VI of Scotland.

== Early life ==
Born around 1558-1560, Patrick Gray, the son of Patrick Gray, 5th Lord Gray, and of his wife Barbara (a daughter of William Ruthven, 2nd Lord Ruthven) grew up as a Protestant and attended the University of Glasgow. In 1575 he married Elizabeth Lyon, daughter of John Lyon, 8th Lord Glamis, a marriage that failed shortly afterwards. It is likely he was the first romantic or sexual partner of James VI Patrick traveled to France, converted to Roman Catholicism and became a supporter of Mary, Queen of Scots (died 1587).

== Political life ==
=== Gentleman of the King's bedchamber ===
On his return to Scotland in 1583, Patrick gained notability as a political schemer and diplomat, endearing himself to the young King James whilst he plotted with James Stewart, Earl of Arran to keep Mary in prison and frustrate Mary's plan for an "associated rule". In October 1584, Gray was appointed a Gentleman of the Privy Chamber and made Master of the King's wardrobe and menagerie, in charge of the king's jewels, clothing and tapestry, and the employment of tailors and shoemakers.

=== England in 1584 ===
Gray was sent as ambassador to England in October 1584. Arran gave him instructions, particluarly concerning the Rebel Lords who were sheltered in England. On his way, Gray spoke to Lord Hunsdon at Berwick who reported their conversation to William Cecil. Elizabeth I told Gray she was reluctant to deliver the rebels, and James ought rather to reconcile the factions in Scotland that had developed during the years of his minority rule. Gray asked for the revels to be lodged further from the border. Gray had conversations with the French ambassador in London, Michel de Castelnau. and described him to Mary, Queen of Scots, as her ally, as "if he were your own natural subject".

Gray received a New Year's Day gift of silver plate from Elizabeth I in January 1585. In Scotland in June, an English diplomat Edward Wotton discussed an English pension for James VI. Francis Walsingham hoped that Gray would help persuade James to accept a smaller sum than first offered.

=== Wedding ===
On 20 July 1585, the Master of Gray married Lady Mary Stewart, daughter of Robert Stewart, 1st Earl of Orkney and cousin to King James. The marriage was attended by most people at court except the followers of the Earl of Arran. Mary, Mistress of Gray, was a friend of Jean Stewart, Countess of Argyll, who left her a gown of cloth of gold, a black velvet gown with gold trim, and scented 'must' beads in 1588.

Gray thought of joining Philip Sidney at Vlissingen in April 1586, fighting against the Spanish with 2,000 or more Scottish recruits. Sidney advised Thomas Mills, a diplomat in Scotland, that Gray might wait until the English force was better established. The Earl of Leicester had doubts about accepting Gray's offer and involvement.

=== England in 1586 ===
Gray was sent by James VI as Scottish Ambassador to England with William Keith of Delny, Robert Melville, and Alexander Stewart to broker with Elizabeth I over the fate of Mary, Queen of Scots. James VI gave Gray detailed instructions. Their speeches and manner of mediation were said to have been counterproductive.

On his return to Scotland, after the execution of Mary, Patrick was declared a traitor and jailed and later banished from Scotland. He was charged with hindering the king's plan to marry a Danish princess. James VI forgave Patrick and allowed him to return to Scotland in 1589, restoring his offices to him, but the Master of Gray continued his scheming career implicating himself in a number of intrigues and plots.

=== Anne of Denmark ===
In 1589, William Cecil hoped to prevent the marriage of James VI and Anne of Denmark. Gray wrote to Cecil on 5 June that the Chancellor, John Maitland would be reluctant to frustrate the king's marriage plan. In Edinburgh, supporters of the Danish marriage had protested before Lord Hamilton, who advocated that James marry Catherine de Bourbon. The Earl Marischal had already received money from the English subsidy sent by Elizabeth I for his voyage to Denmark to complete the marriage. Gray still held out hopes that James could be persuaded to abandon his wedding plan.

James VI gave lands to Anne of Denmark as a wedding gift, including the former properties of Dunfermline Abbey. To compensate the Master of Gray, who had rights to the title of Abbot or Commendator of Dunfermline, on 6 July 1590 James allocated him 12,000 merks from the next installment of his English subsidy. Gray was to resign his Dunfermline title to the king's "dearest spouse".

It was said that Gray met the rebel Earl of Bothwell and John Colville on 28 July 1592 at "Gubriell", a house belonging to the Earl Marischal near Dunfermline, and afterwards went to England. Gray and his wife were invited to the baptism of Prince Henry at Stirling Castle in August 1594. In August 1595, Gray seems to have been serving as keeper of Prince Henry's wardrobe, and took delivery of a little coffer worth £8 Scots for the Prince's clothes.

On 3 May 1598, the Duke of Holstein, brother of Anne of Denmark, came to Fowlis Castle for dinner during his progress, escorted by William Schaw. Lord Gray was ordered by James VI to meet him six miles from the castle.

=== France in 1598 ===
In November 1598, the Master of Gray was travelling in Picardy then visited the Earl of Gowrie at Orléans. He spoke to Esmé Stewart's widow, Catherine de Balsac, at Aubigny-sur-Nère, who feared that her son, Ludovic Stewart, 2nd Duke of Lennox was plotting with Henry Kier, (a Catholic agent). Gray was trying to secure Lennox's inheritance. He had an audience with Henry IV of France, who was waiting for James VI to send him Scottish hunting hounds.

In a letter of November 1600, Gray described the aftermath of the Gowrie Conspiracy. The Ruthven family were ordered to change their surname, and the House of Ruthven near Perth was renamed as Huntingtower. Some suspicion had fallen on Anne of Denmark, and some people would be removed from her household after the birth of her child (Prince Charles).

=== Later years ===
In May 1601, John Erskine, Earl of Mar and Edward Bruce, Commendator of Kinloss returned from an embassy to London. Although they had reached an understanding on the succession of James VI to the throne of England, it was kept secret. The apparent lack of achievement was seen as an opportunity for Mar's political opponents to supplant him, and the Master of Gray attempted to gain the confidence of Robert Cecil in England. Cecil, however, did not even tell Gray of his secret correspondence with the Scottish King.

Gray was also involved in a coalition of Anne of Denmark and the Duke of Lennox against Mar. In September 1602, Anne of Denmark and Gray entertained Anne de Gondi, the wife of French ambassador the Baron de Tour, at Falkland Palace, while he went on a progress with the king. Lord Henry Howard noted that Gray had spent this time with Queen Anne and it affected the conceit in his writing style.

He wrote in August 1605 to the Earl of Salisbury that his son, who had been in France for his health, would soon come to court in London with his uncle, the Master of Orkney, at the invitation of George Home, Earl of Dunbar.

Patrick became 6th Lord Gray on his father's death in 1609, three years before his own death in 1612. He was succeeded by his son Andrew Gray, 7th Lord Gray.

=== Gray and the royal wardrobe ===
The expenses of the Scottish royal wardrobe on rich fabrics were very large. A note of the income of the wardrobe made in June 1586 is held by the British Library adding to entries in the treasurer's accounts. The Master of Gray had received £6,890 Scots but was "superexpendit all for clething to his majestie", and recorded an overspend of £4,316. In subsequent years, James VI used funds from an annual subsidy sent by Elizabeth I. An Edinburgh merchant, Robert Jousie, and a goldsmith, Thomas Foulis, managed the accounts.

After the Union of the Crowns, in August 1604, King James indicated that Robert Jousie and one of the king's tailor's Alexander Miller were owed money by the Master of Gray for an old debt from the 1580s. Gray sent his receipts to Lord Cecil to show that he did not owe any money.

An undated letter from the Master of Gray requested some purchases in London, including a sword and a dagger with "black guards not long", a black panache for a woman, gold and silver thread of the greatest sort, for gentlewomen to sew with, tapestry to hang two chambers, and a Venice hat for his wife. Gray asked for a silver basin and jug, the lightest (and cheapest) and gilded only on the borders. His correspondent was to bring home the jewels if they were ready, and Gray would reimburse him for everything.

== Family ==
Gray married secondly, on 20 July 1585, Mary Stewart, a daughter of Robert Stewart, 1st Earl of Orkney. James VI attended the wedding. Their children included:

- Elizabeth Gray, (b. 1586).
- Andrew Gray, 7th Lord Gray
- Jean Gray (d. 1639), married John Wemyss, 1st Earl of Wemyss
- Agnes Gray, Countess of Menteith (d. 1667), married William Graham, 7th Earl of Menteith

In September 1597 Anne of Denmark was planning her formal entry to Dundee and she wrote to Mary Stewart, Mistress of Gray to meet her in Perth and accompany her to Dundee.

== Literature ==
The author Nigel Tranter wrote the historical novels The Master of Gray trilogy Lord and Master, The Courtesan and Past Master about Patrick, 6th Lord Gray.

Preceded by Patrick Gray, 5th Lord Gray	Lord Gray; 1608–1612	Succeeded by Andrew Gray, 7th Lord Gray
