= Kinfauns Parish Church =

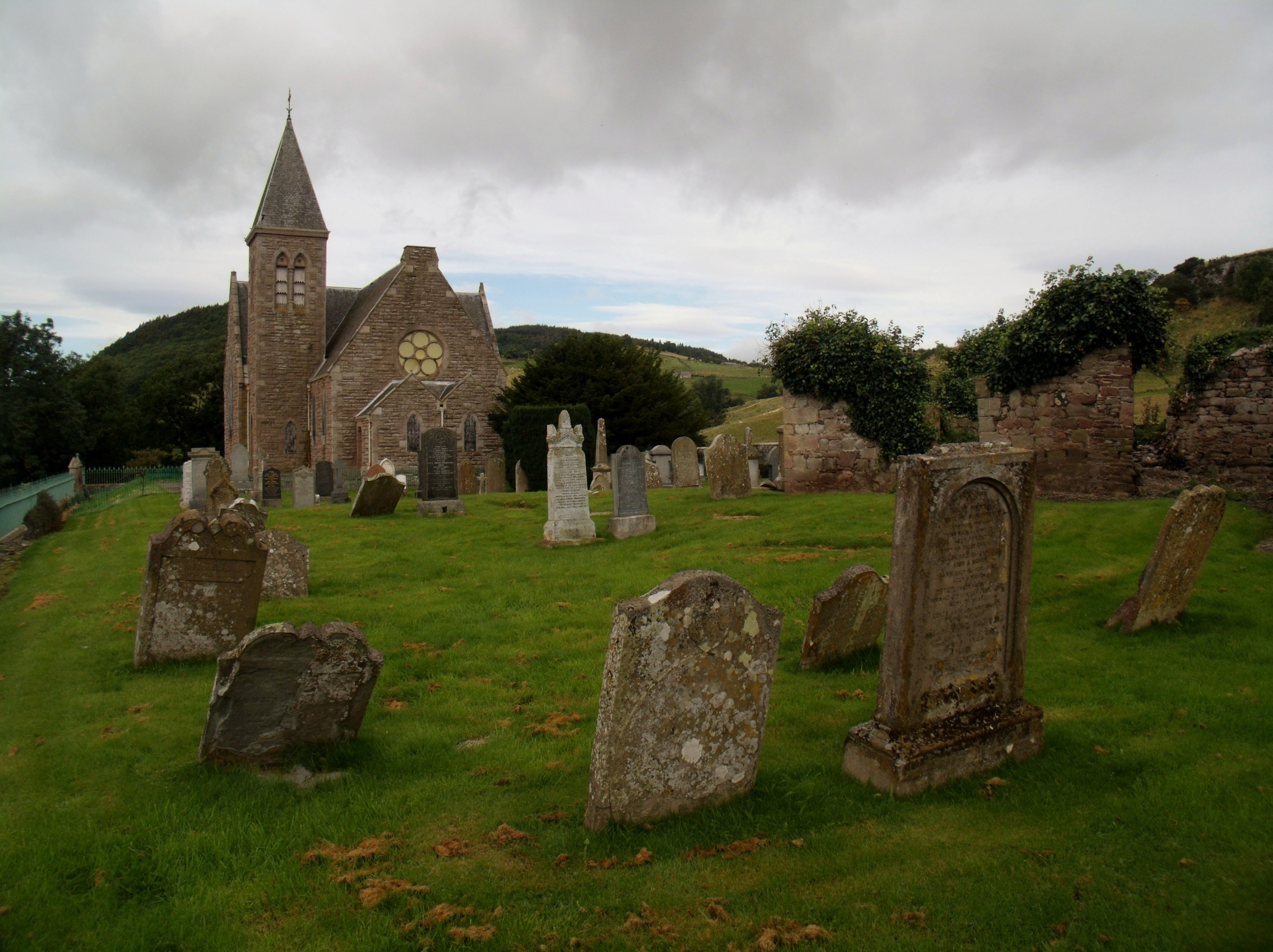
- 2012 view, looking northwest to Kinnoull Hill
- Kinfauns Parish Church
- 56°23′07″N 3°21′08″W
- Location: Church Road; Kinfauns, Perth and Kinross, Scotland
- Country: Scotland
- Denomination: Church of Scotland

Architecture
- Architect(s): Andrew Heiton and John Murray Robertson
- Completed: 1869; 157 years ago

Kinfauns Parish Church is a Church of Scotland church in Kinfauns, Perth and Kinross, Scotland. Dating to 1869, the work of architect Andrew Heiton and John Murray Robertson, it is a Category C listed building. The congregation has moved to the new Madoch Centre.

The ruined pre-Reformation church dates from the 15th century; however, it stands on the site of a chapel of Scone Abbey that existed as early as 1226.

== Ministers ==
- Robert Gordon (from 1816 to 1821)
- Roger Davidson

== Notable interments ==
The following people are buried in the church's kirkyard, which is also a listed structure:

- Sir Denys Lowson, 1st Baronet (1906–1975)

== Gallery ==
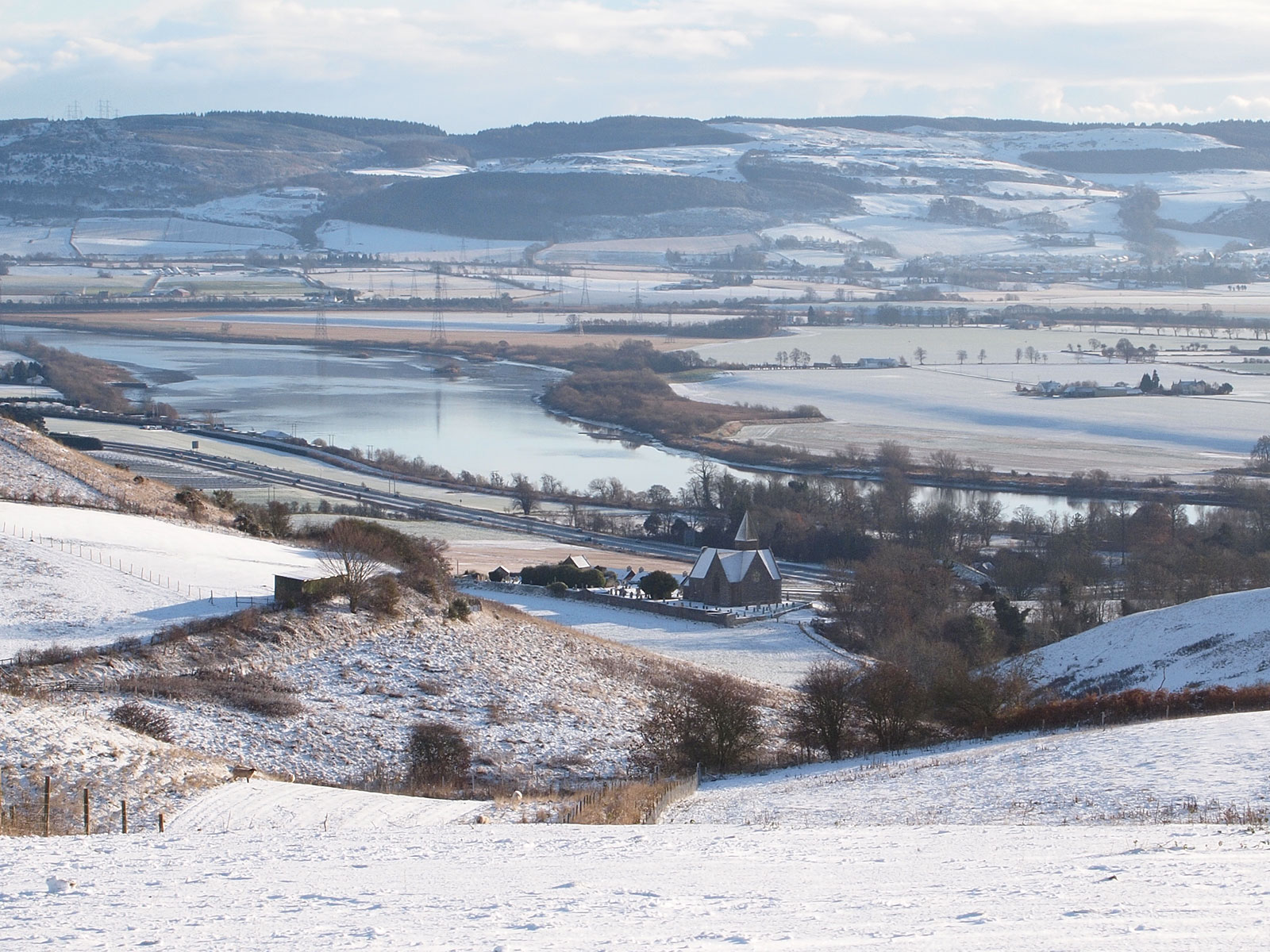
The church from Northlees Farm, near Deuchny Wood, in 2010

== See also ==
- List of listed buildings in Kinfauns, Perth and Kinross
