= Witches' Stone =

Historic stone in Perth and Kinross, Scotland

- Location in the United Kingdom Location in Scotland
- 56.469133°N 3.366258°W
- Location: St Martins, Perth and Kinross, Scotland

Witches' Stone is an historic stone in the Scottish parish of St Martins, Perth and Kinross. It marks the location where Macbeth meets with two witches in William Shakespeare's tragedy. It is first mentioned in text in 1806, when William Mackenzie, father of architect William Macdonald Mackenzie, was the landowner.

The stone, which first appeared on Ordnance Survey maps in 1866, stands around 4 feet (1.2 m) high and has a groove on its top, believed to be the result of a chain being used on it.

== See also ==
- List of individual rocks
