= Angus Campbell-Gray, 22nd Lord Gray =

British hereditary peer

The Right Honourable The Lord Gray

Personal details
- Born: 3 July 1931 Kilconquhar, Fife, Scotland
- Died: 29 April 2003 (aged 71)
- Spouse(s): Patricia Alexander; Cecilia Dimsdale
- Children: Lucinda Campbell-Gray; Iona Campbell-Gray; Andrew Campbell-Gray, 23rd Lord Gray; Cethlyn Campbell-Gray
- Parent(s): Lindsay Campbell-Gray, Master of Gray; Doreen McClymont Tubbs
- Relatives: Ethel Gray-Campbell, 21st Lady Gray (paternal grandmother)
- Education: Eton College
- Occupation: Hereditary peer

Angus Campbell-Gray, 22nd Lord Gray (3 July 1931 – 29 April 2003) was a British hereditary peer. He was a member of the House of Lords until 1999.

== Early life ==
Angus Diarmid Ian Campbell-Gray was born on 3 July 1931 in Kilconquhar, Fife, Scotland. His father, Major Lindsay Campbell-Gray, Master of Gray (1894-1945), was a World War I veteran and later trainer of steeplechasers. His mother was Doreen McClymont Tubbs. His father died when he was 13 and his mother when he was 17.

He was educated at Eton College, near Windsor.

== Career ==
He started his career at Mather & Crowther, an advertising firm, where he designed the label on HP Sauce bottles. He moved to Canada in 1956, where he worked for the Bell Telephone Corporation. Later, he became the owner of the Taynuilt Hotel in Argyll, Scotland. He also owned a petrol station where he attended to the pumps himself.

He inherited his title from his late paternal grandmother, Ethel Gray-Campbell, 21st Lady Gray, in 1946. As a result, he was a hereditary peer for more than half a century. In 1977, he suggested an amendment to what came to be known as the Scotland Act 1978 a year later. In 1999, he argued that the bill which led to the House of Lords Act 1999 ran afoul of the Act of Union, which let Scottish peers sit in the House of Lords. The Committee for Privileges looked into his objection before the bill was passed. He was interviewed in The Lord's Tale, a television documentary directed by Molly Dineen about hereditary peers.

He was involved with the Oban Games, the local Highland games in Oban, and served as a steward of the Argyllshire Gathering, whose President is the Duke of Argyll. He also attended the Oban Ball. A keen foxhunter, he took part in the West Waterford Hunt in County Waterford, Ireland. He owned a small filling station in Argyll.

== Personal life ==
He was married twice. His first wife was Patricia Alexander. They had four children:

- Lucinda Campbell-Gray (born 1961).
- Iona Campbell-Gray (born 1962).
- Andrew Campbell-Gray, 23rd Lord Gray (born 1964).
- Cethlyn Campbell-Gray (born 1969).

His second wife was Cecilia Dimsdale. They had no children.

== Death ==
He died on 29 April 2003. He was seventy-one years old. His son inherited his title.

Peerage of Scotland
Preceded by Ethel Gray-Campbell, 21st Lady Gray	Lord Gray; 1946–2003	Succeeded by Andrew Campbell-Gray, 23rd Lord Gray
