= Andrew Gray, 1st Lord Gray =

Scottish knight

Andrew Gray, 1st Lord Gray (c. 1390–1469) was a Scottish nobleman, politician and diplomat. He was succeeded in the title by his grandson.

== Biography ==
He was the eldest son of Sir Andrew Gray (d. 1445) of Fowlis, Dundee. He was a natural son thus not a son by his first wife Janet, daughter of Sir Roger de Mortimer, whom he married in 1377. He had a brother also name Andrew who was born much later to his father's second wife.

In 1424 he was accepted by the English government as one of the hostages for the payment of the ransom of James I of Scotland, apparently in place of his father, whose estate was estimated at the time as being worth six hundred merks annually. His father presented a letter to the English government, in which the hostage is said to be his only son and heir, promising fidelity on behalf of his son, and also that he would not disinherit him on account of his acting as a hostage. He was sent to Pontefract Castle, and afterwards committed to the Tower of London, where he remained until 1427, when he was exchanged for Malcolm Fleming, son of the laird of Cumbernauld.

In 1436, he accompanied Princess Margaret, daughter of James I, to France, for her marriage to the Dauphin Louis. In 1449 he was appointed part of a committee of the Estates to examine previous acts of Parliament and general councils, and report to Parliament on their existing validity. On various occasions between 1449 and 1460 he was employed as one of the Scottish ambassadors to negotiate treaties of peace with England, and appointed as a general conservator of these treaties. He briefly acted as a Warden of the Marches.

In 1451, along with the abbot of Melrose Abbey, he received a safe-conduct to allow him to make a pilgrimage to Canterbury, and in 1452 he became Master of the Household to James II.

On 26 August that year he was granted permission to build a castle on any part of his lands, and he built Castle Huntly on his estate of Longforgan in the carse of Gowrie (not to be confused with the older Huntly Castle, in Aberdeenshire). This castle, long the residence of the family, was sold to the Earl of Strathmore in 1615, and the name changed to Castle Lyon. In 1777, it was repurchased by George Paterson, who married Anne Gray, daughter of the 11th Lord Gray, and restored the original name.

In 1455, he was one of the nobles who secured the forfeiture of the Earl of Douglas. In the following year, the abbot of Scone sued him for paying the dues of Inchmartin in bad grain. He took an active part in parliamentary work, and in 1464 was appointed one of the lords auditors for hearing and determining civil causes. He accompanied James III to Berwick, where he had the authority of Parliament to ratify the truce with England being negotiated at Newcastle. He died in 1469, probably towards the end of the year; he is mentioned as deceased in a document of 20 January 1469–70.

He married, on 31 August 1418, Elizabeth Wemyss, the eldest daughter of Sir John Wemyss of Wemyss and Reres, with whom it was stipulated he should receive as dowry a £30 land in Strathardle, Perthshire. This condition was not observed, and gave rise to litigation at a later date. His wife survived him.

They had two sons and two daughters. The elder son, Sir Patrick Gray of Kineff, predeceased his father. He had married Anabella Forbes, daughter of Alexander Forbes, 1st Lord Forbes, and had one son, who became Andrew Gray, 2nd Lord Gray. The other three children were the younger son Andrew, and daughters Margaret (married Robert, Lord Lyle) and Christian (married James Crighton/Crichton of Strathurd).

== Bibliography ==
- Acts of the Parliaments of Scotland, ii. 36–195, xii. 30
- Acta Auditorum, pp. 3, 6
- Registrum Magni Sigilli, vol. ii. passim
- Exchequer Rolls of Scotland, vols. iv–viii.
- Rotuli Scotiæ, ii. 245–458
- Rymer's Fœdera, Hague ed., iv. pt. iv. 102–30, v. pt. ii. 11–89.
