= Thomas Charteris =

Scottish nobleman

Sir Thomas Charteris (died 1346) styled "of Amisfield".

He was appointed ambassador to England by David II, who also made him Lord High Chancellor of Scotland in 1342. He was killed in 1346 at the Battle of Neville's Cross, when a Scottish army invaded England to help Philip VI of France during the Hundred Years' War.

He is distinct from Sir Thomas Charteris (born de Longueville French born) Scottish knight, the "Red Rover", the traditional first lord Kinfauns founder of the Charteris family of Kinfauns, and, according to tradition, his sword is preserved at Kinfauns Castle Prominent supporter of Sir William Wallace and King Robert the Bruce during Scotland’s Wars of Independence.
