= Loch Kaitre =

- Location within Perth and Kinross
- Location: Kinfauns, Perth and Kinross, Scotland
- Coordinates: 56.3869780°N 3.350517721°W
- Type: Loch
- Basin countries: Scotland, United Kingdom
- Surface elevation: 223 feet (68 m)
- Frozen: No

Loch Kaitre (possibly Loch Kaitres) was a loch in Kinfauns, Perth and Kinross, Scotland.

The loch formerly occupied the site beside the Manse of Kinfauns. It was still present in 1838, but in the mid-19th century, a sinkhole appeared and the manse fell in, witnessed by the minister, who had just left his home en route to the church. The loch remained for a few generations, before being drained by a tenant later in the century for agricultural use of the land beneath it.
