= John Simpson (VC) =

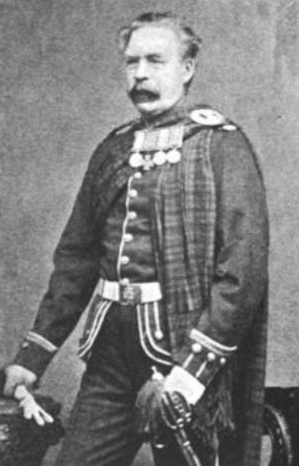
- Born: 29 January 1826; Edinburgh, Scotland
- Died: 27 October 1884 (aged 58); St Martins, Perth and Kinross, Scotland
- Burial place: St Martin's Churchyard, St Martin's
- Military career
- Allegiance: United Kingdom
- Branch: British Army
- Rank: Major
- Units: 42nd Regiment of Foot
- Conflicts: Crimean War; Indian Mutiny
- Awards: Victoria Cross

Major John Simpson VC (29 January 1826 – 27 October 1884) was a Scottish recipient of the Victoria Cross, the highest and most prestigious award for gallantry in the face of the enemy that can be awarded to British and Commonwealth forces.

Simpson had served with the 42nd (Royal Highland) Regiment of Foot (later the Black Watch) of the British Army throughout the Crimean campaign, including the Battles of the Alma and Inkerman, the expedition to Kerch and Yeni-Kale, and the Siege of Sevastopol. He then served with the regiment in the Indian Mutiny, including the Second Battle of Cawnpore, the actions of Seraighat, Kudygunge and Shumehabad, and the Siege and Capture of Lucknow, including the assault of La Martinière and Banks's Bungalow, and the attack on Fort Ruhya.

It was during the attack on Fort Ruhya on 15 April 1858 that Simpson, then a 32-year-old quartermaster-sergeant, volunteered to go to an exposed point within 40 yards (37 m) of the parapet of the fort under heavy fire and carried back a lieutenant and a private, both of whom were seriously wounded. For this action he was awarded the VC.

Simpson was commissioned as a quartermaster on 7 October 1859 and in 1878 he transferred to the Royal Perth Rifles Militia (from 1881 the 3rd Battalion, Black Watch). In 1881 he was granted the honorary rank of Captain and in 1883 he was promoted to Honorary Major. His grave and memorial are at Balbeggie Churchyard, St. Martin's, near Perth, Scotland. His medal is on display in the United States at the Natural History Museum of Los Angeles County, in Los Angeles.
