= Kinnoull Tower =

Building in Perth and Kinross, Scotland

Looking east along the River Tay

Kinnoull Tower stands on an outcrop a few hundred yards to the east of, and several feet below, the 222-metre-high (728 ft) summit of Kinnoull Hill in Perth, Scotland. A folly built in the eighteenth century by Thomas Hay, 9th Earl of Kinnoull, to resemble castles along the Rhine he had admired in Germany during his Grand Tour of Europe, it is now Category B listed structure.

== Background ==
Thomas Hay saw a similarity between the mountainous landscape along the Rhine and the rocky outcrops on his estate near Perth. On his return, to achieve a similar effect, he built a modest castle on the highest point of Kinnoull Hill, with its tower overlooking the River Tay.

Another of Hay's lasting legacies is the Perth Bridge over the Tay, but further upstream, which he helped fund.

Jane Austen visited Kinnoull Hill in September 1789. She described Kinnoull Tower in "Lesley Castle", one of two Scottish stories in her Juvenilia, as:

An old and Mouldering Castle, which is situated two miles from Perth on a bold projecting Rock, and commands an extensive view of the Town and its delightful Environs.

Today the tower is more easily accessible, via a winding footpath through the woodland park.

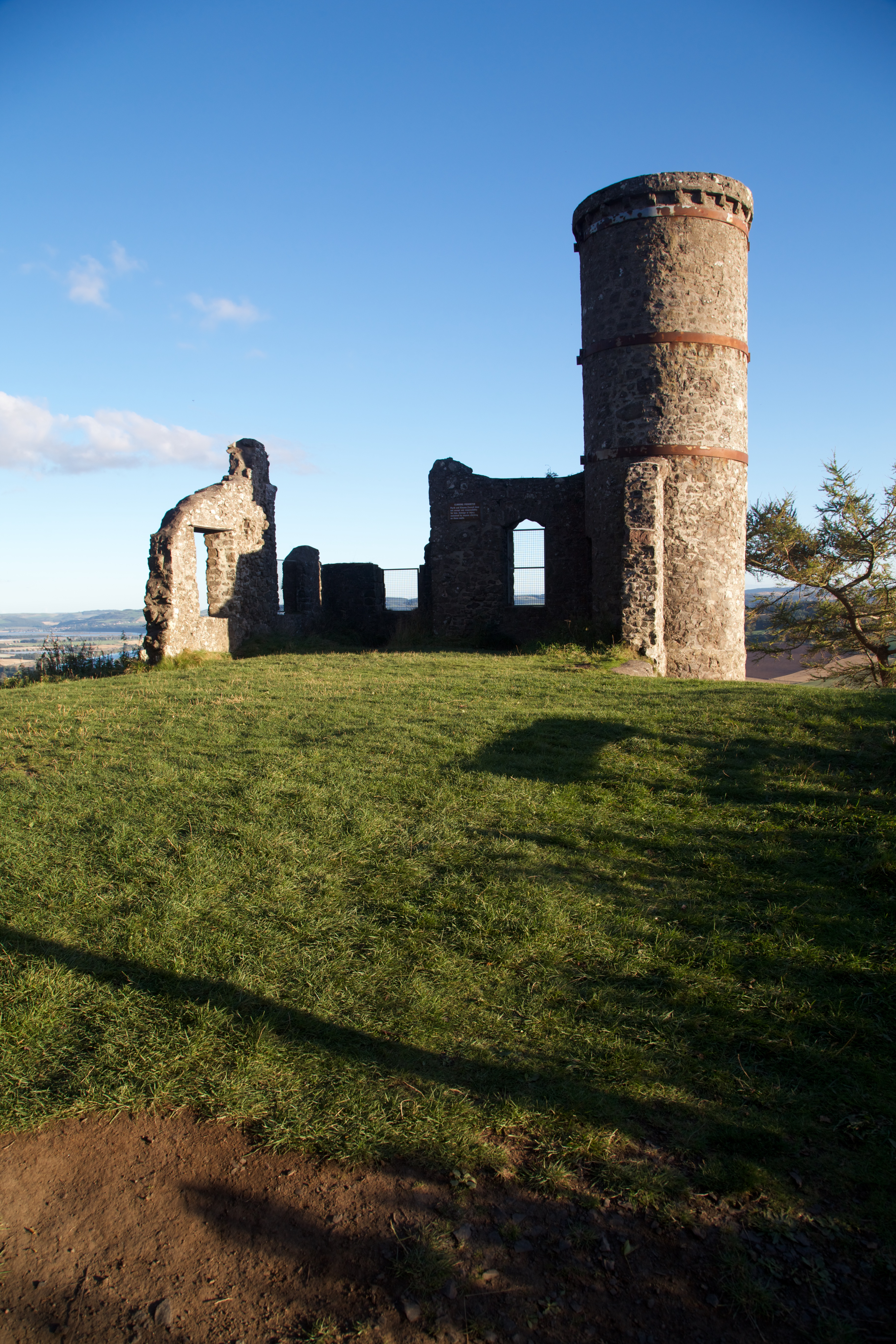
A closer view

== See also ==
- List of listed buildings in Kinfauns, Perth and Kinross
