= St Martins, Perth and Kinross =

Coordinates: 56.4556°N 3.3789948°W

St Martins: Scottish Gaelic: Cille Mhàrtainn
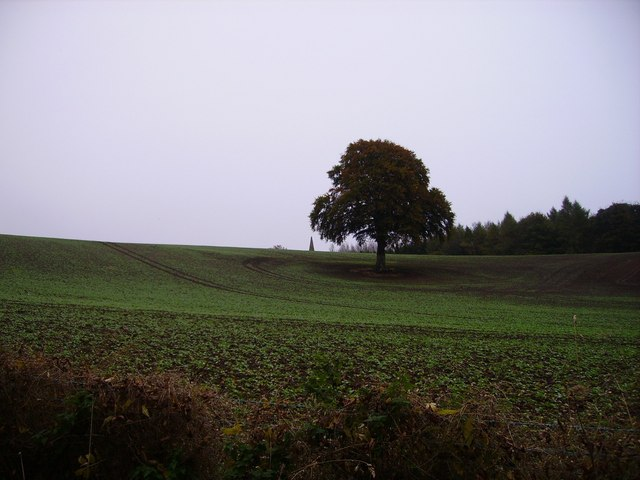
- A monument to the northeast of the parish

- Location within Perth and Kinross
- Council area: Perth and Kinross
- Lieutenancy area: Perth and Kinross
- Country: Scotland
- Sovereign state: United Kingdom
- Post town: PERTH
- Postcode district: PH2
- Dialling code: 01738
- Police: Scotland
- Fire: Scottish
- Ambulance: Scottish
- UK Parliament: Perth and North Perthshire
- Scottish Parliament: North Tayside; North East Scotland

St Martins is a parish in Perth and Kinross, Scotland, just north of the Sidlaws range of hills, about 4.3 miles (6.9 km) north-northeast of Perth and 1.2 miles (1.9 km) northwest of Balbeggie. The parish is named for Martin of Tours, of Lower Hungary.

Perth Airport, at Scone, is 1 mile (1.6 km) to the south, and the parish is beneath the climb-out of aircraft departing from runway 03.

The parish is mentioned in William Shakespeare's Macbeth, in a scene in which the title character meets with two witches on a moor in the parish. The location is marked by today's Witches' Stone.

== Notable people ==
- William Davidson Bissett, recipient of the Victoria Cross
- William Macdonald Mackenzie, architect, was born in the parish
- John Simpson, recipient of the Victoria Cross
