= Fowlis Castle =

Castle near Dundee, Scotland

Coordinates: 56.487°N 3.103°W

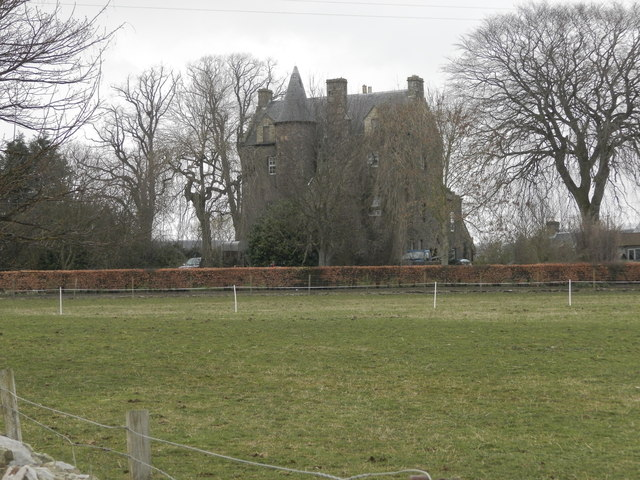
Fowlis Castle

Fowlis Castle is situated five miles (eight kilometres) northwest of Dundee, Scotland, in the hamlet of Fowlis. It is a tower house dating from the seventeenth century. It was held by the Maule family and then by the Mortimers before coming to the Gray family in 1337. Sir Alexander Gray of Broxmouth was made Lord Gray of Fowlis. The castle is currently occupied as a farm house, and is a category B listed building.

On Monday 3 May 1598 the brother of Anne of Denmark, the Duke of Holstein, came to Fowlis for dinner during his progress. Patrick Gray, 5th Lord Gray was ordered by James VI of Scotland to meet him six miles (ten kilometres) from the castle.
