= Kinfauns Castle =

- The castle, with Kinnoull Hill in the background, in the early 20th century

- Location of Kinfauns Castle in Perth and Kinross
- 56.3883°N 3.3780°W
- Location: Kinfauns, near Perth, Scotland

History
- Built: 1825
- Built for: Lord Gray

Site notes
- Architect: Robert Smirke
- Architectural style: Castellated

Listed Building – Category A
- Designated: 5 October 1971
- Reference no.: LB11955

Inventory of Gardens and Designed Landscapes in Scotland
- Official name: Kinfauns Castle
- Designated: 30 June 1987
- Reference no.: GDL00240

Kinfauns Castle is a 19th-century castle in the Scottish village of Kinfauns, Perth and Kinross. It is in the Castellated Gothic style, with a slight asymmetry typical of Scottish Georgian. It stands on a raised terrace facing south over the River Tay. The house is protected as a category A listed building, and the grounds are included in the Inventory of Gardens and Designed Landscapes in Scotland.

== History ==
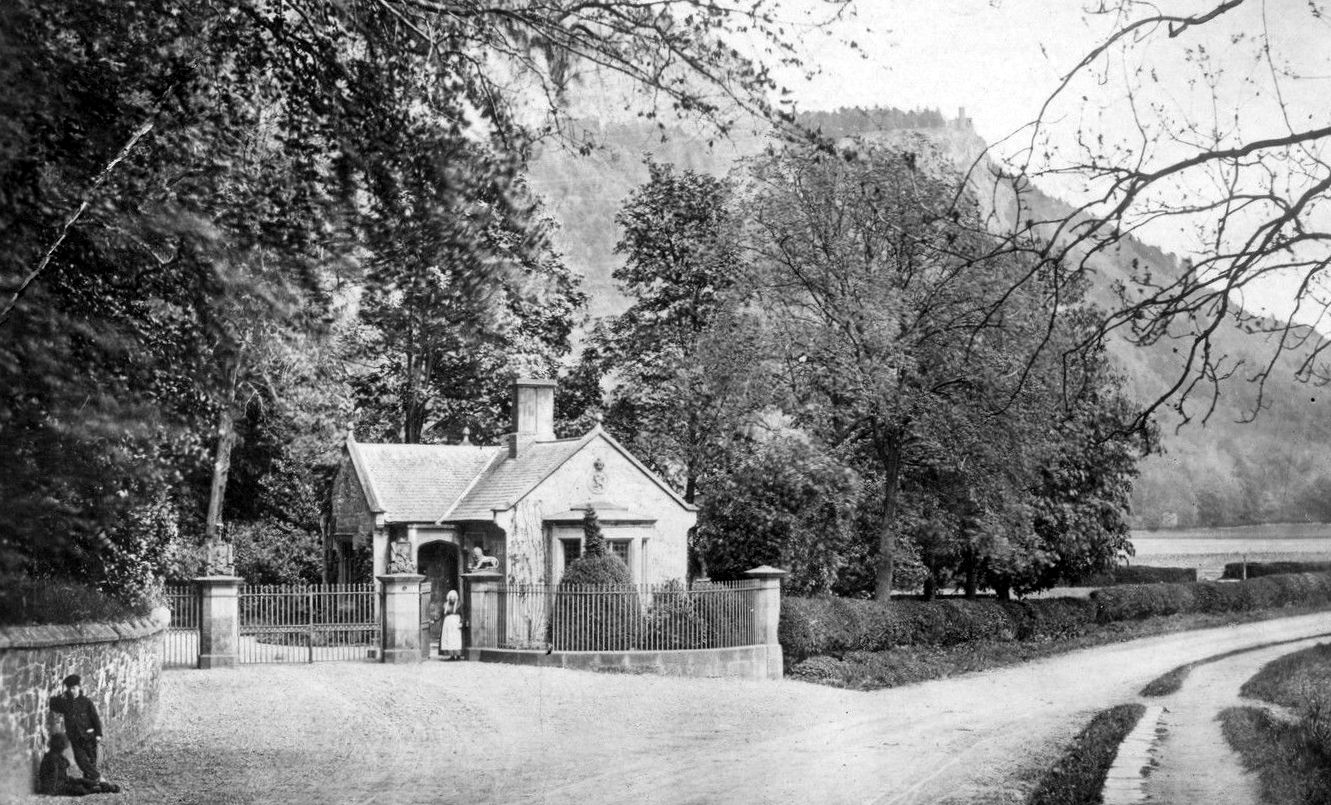
Gatehouse to the castle, circa 1840. The road in view here has been replaced by the A85, near its junction with the M90 and A90. The now-modified building is today a home. The gateposts also survive

In reward for his services at the capture of Perth in 1313, Thomas de Longueville was granted land east of Perth by Robert the Bruce. Thomas married the heiress of Charteris of Kinfauns and changed his name to Charteris. He built a castle named Kinfauns Castle on the lands granted. His family had a long-running feud with the Ruthvens of Perth and in 1552 John Charteris was murdered by the Ruthvens on the High Street (Royal Mile) in Edinburgh. The property passed from the Charteris family to the Carnegies and from there to the Blairs. Charteris' sword is believed to still be within the castle.

The old estate and former castle passed into the Gray family when Margaret Blair (Carnegie), Daughter of Alexander Blair (Carnegie) and Jean Carnegie of Finhaven. She married the 11th Lord Gray in 1741. The current castle was designed by Sir Robert Smirke and built between 1822 and 1826 by Francis Gray, 14th Lord Gray, on the site of a medieval stronghold. It passed to the Stuart Earls of Moray in 1878 and descended in that family to Morton Stuart, 17th Earl of Moray. He commissioned several improvements; the walled garden and gardener's cottage were designed by Francis William Deas in 1910. After the death of the 17th Earl in 1930 the estate became the property of Scottish Estates Ltd, who sold off most of the land piecemeal.

The marriage of Margaret Blair Carnegie parents caused a great scandal as her father Alexander was 14 and her mother Jean was 12. They were married at Oathlaw Kirk under the coercion of James Carnegie in an attempt to control the Blair of Kinfauns Estates. Alexander was his nephew and his ward, Jean's first cousin.

The house and remaining land is currently occupied by Scottish businesswoman Ann Gloag, co-founder of the Stagecoach company.

== Railway ==
During the build-up to Dundee and Perth Railway's opening in 1847, Lord Gray would only allow the line to come through his estate for a then-hefty fee of £12,000.

== Cultural reference ==
The Union-Castle Line steamer RMS Kinfauns Castle was launched in 1899 and was named after this building. The vessel was painted by Charles de Lacy.

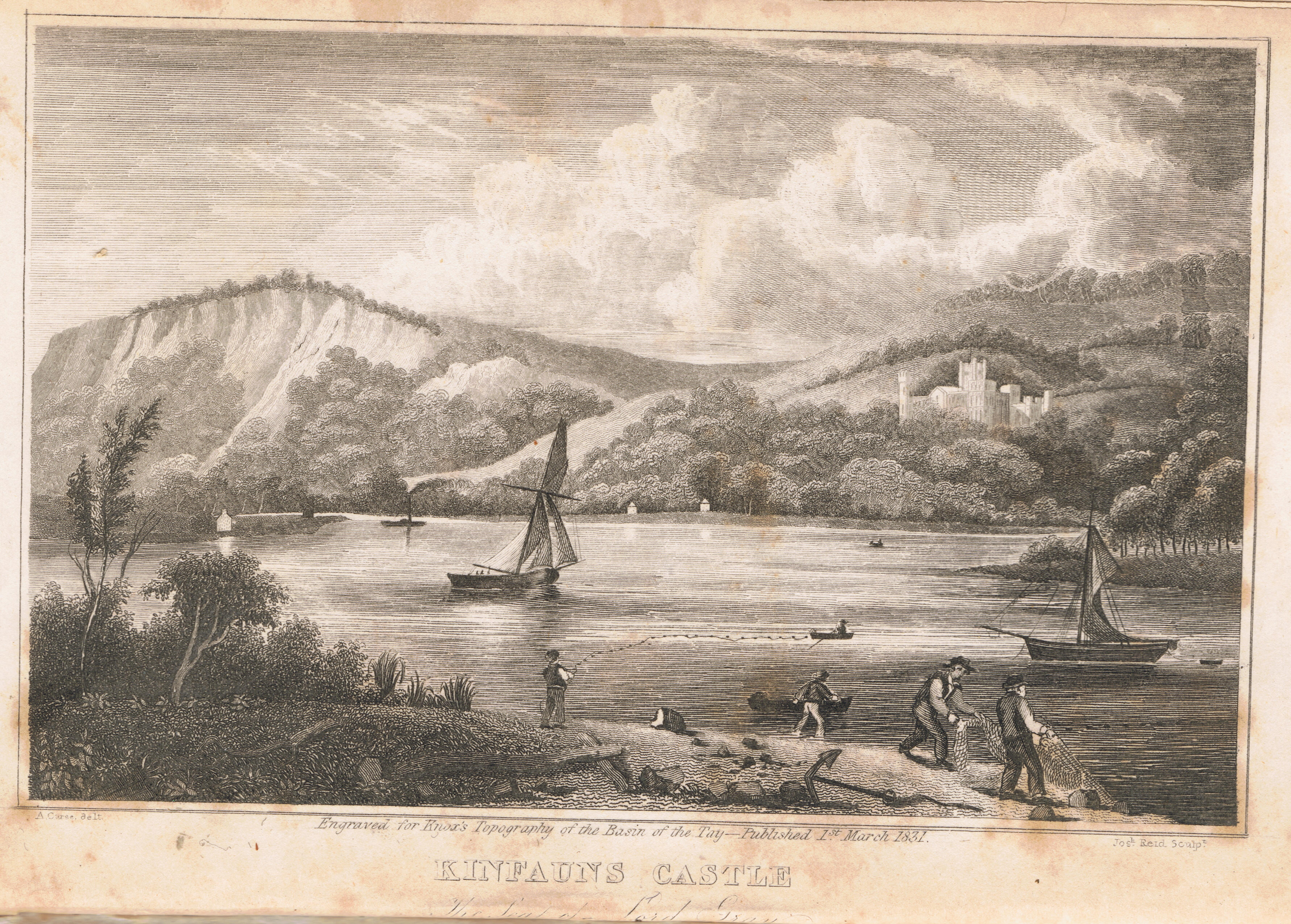
Kinfauns castle, engraved by J. Reid after Alexander Carse, in James Knox's Topography of the Basin of the Tay, 1831.
