= Deuchny Wood =

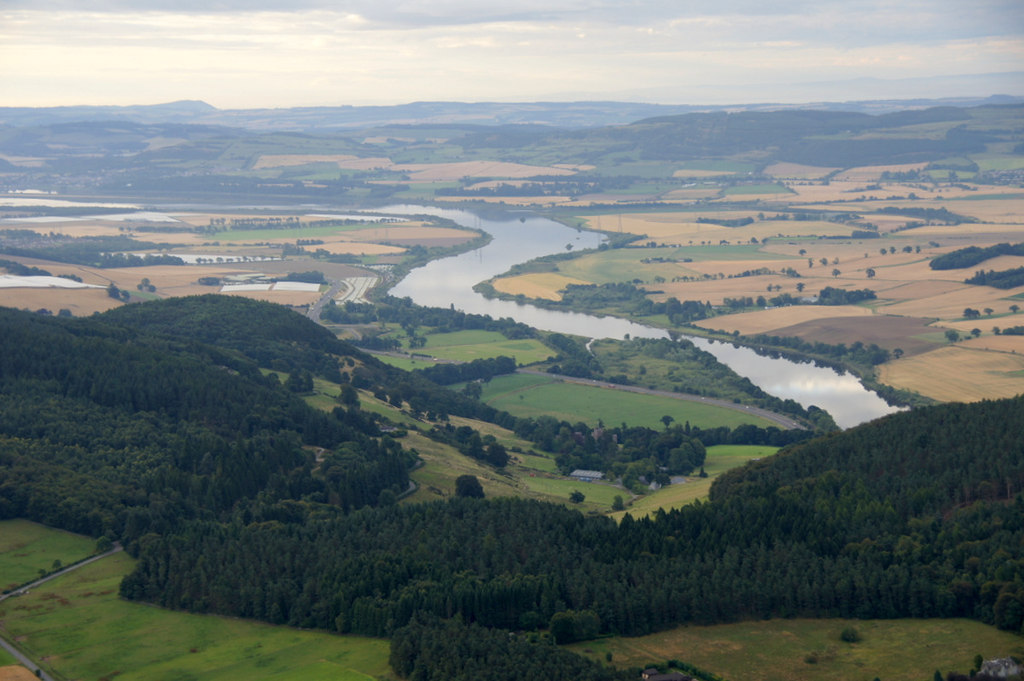
- Deuchny Wood from the air, looking east over the River Tay and the Carse of Gowrie

- Location within Perth and Kinross Location within Scotland
- Interactive map of Deuchny Wood

Geography
- Location: Perth and Kinross, Scotland
- Coordinates: 56.395944°N 3.37689°W

Deuchny Wood (also known as Deuchny Woodland Park) is a Forestry and Land Scotland site in Perth, Scotland. 350.36 acres (141.79 ha) in size, it is adjacent to Kinnoull Hill Woodland Park, of which Deuchny Hill is one of the five constituent hills (the others being Kinnoull Hill, Corsiehill, Barnhill and Binn).

The wood is home to a prehistoric hillfort, referred to as "Iqudonbeg" in 1403, at which several artefacts have been discovered.

Deuchny Burn flows out of the woods to the south, while Langley Burn cuts through its northeastern corner.

Jonathan Gloag, the 28-year-old son of Stagecoach Group co-founder Ann Gloag, hanged himself in Deuchny Wood in 1999.

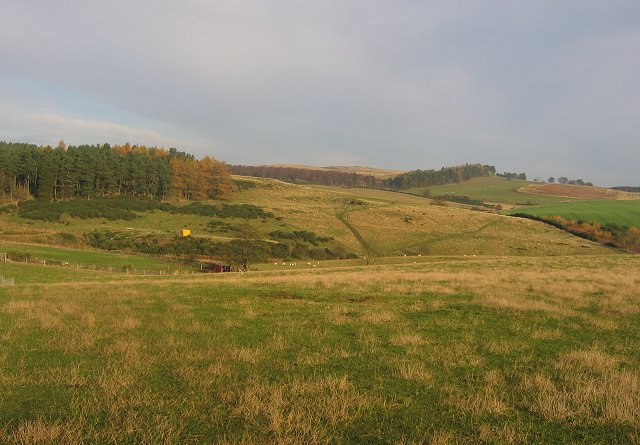
The eastern edge of the wood
