= Kinnoull Hill =

Hill in Perth and Kinross, Scotland

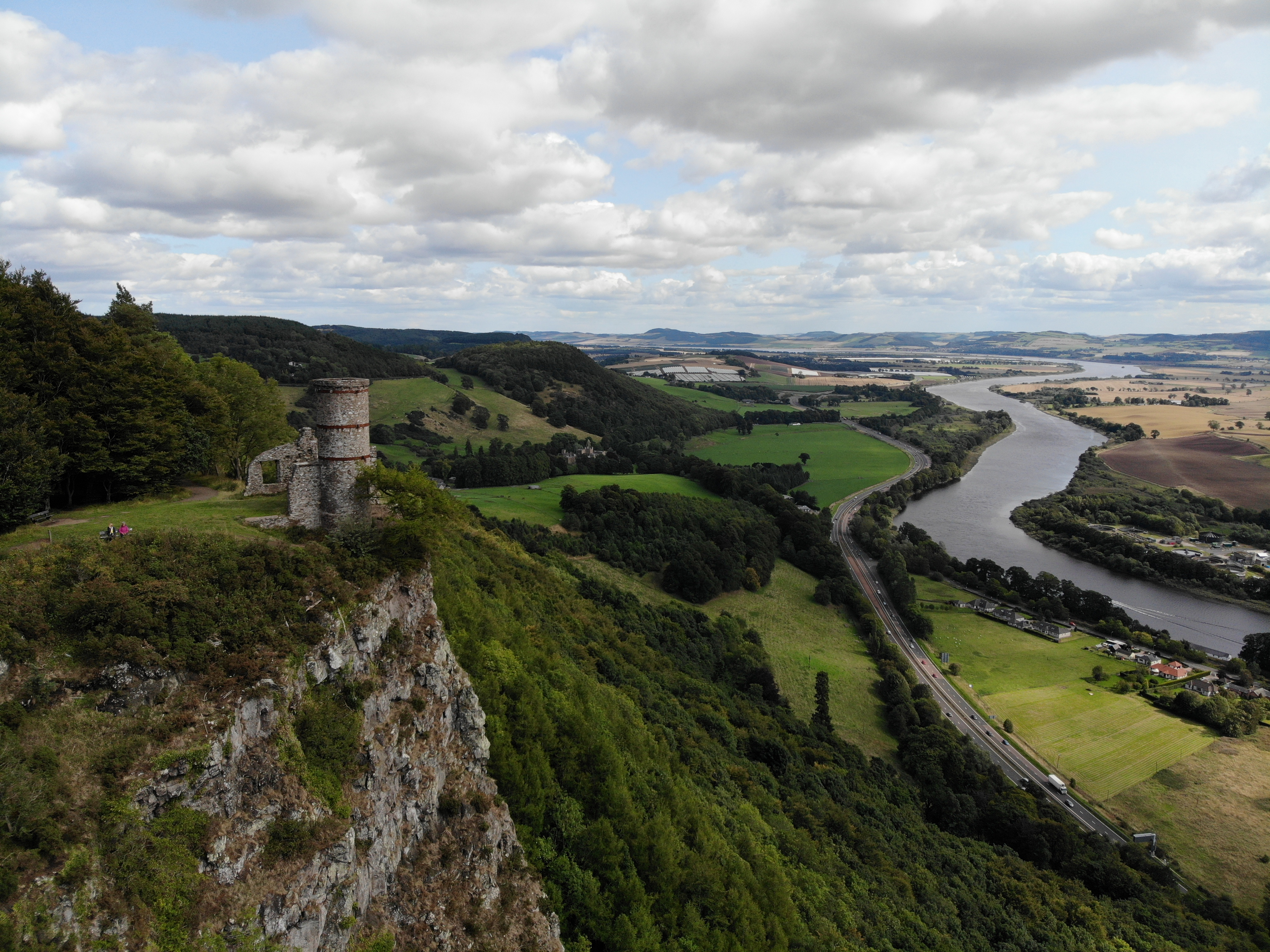
- View east to Kinnoull Tower, the A90 and the River Tay

Highest point
- Elevation: 222 m (728 ft)
- Coordinates: 56°23′23″N 3°24′00″W

Geography
- Location: Perth, Scotland

Kinnoull Hill is a hill located partly in Perth and partly in Kinfauns, Perth and Kinross, Scotland. It shares its name with the nearby Kinnoull parish. The 18th-century Kinnoull Tower stands on an outcrop to the east of the hill's summit.

== Summit ==
In view from the 222-metre-high (728 ft) south-facing summit is the Friarton Bridge, a stretch of the Tay Coast railway line and the Sidlaw Hills. Further to the south, Moncreiffe Hill can be seen.

[The view] commands the lower course of the Tay and its estuary, widening out between the level expanse of the Carse of Gowrie, thickly sprinkled with farms and mansions, and the opposing shores of Fife, onward to where it is closed by the smoke of Dundee and the line of the Tay Bridge.

— Francis Watt, 1889

Near the summit, which is divided into two points, is the Windy Gowle, a hollow which (historically, at least) offered "an echo of nine distinct reverberations".

William Wallace is said to have concealed himself in a cave on the hill, to avoid detection by his pursuers.

== Awards ==
In 2009 and again in 2010, Kinnoull Hill was awarded Green Flag status. In 2010, Kinnoull Hill Woodland Park also came runner up in Scotland's Finest Woods Awards.

== Management ==
Kinnoull Hill Woodland Park is managed in a partnership between Forestry and Land Scotland and Perth & Kinross Council. A Users Group has also been established for many years and supports the management of the Woodland Park through a Management Committee. Branklyn Garden was built by Dorothy Renton and her husband in the western foothills of Kinnoull Hill. The house and garden are owned by the National Trust for Scotland.

In 1793, wild roses which were discovered on the hill were transplanted into an extensive nearby nursery owned by James Dickson and James Brown. At its peak, the nursery employed around eighty people.

== Sculptures ==
Woodland sculptures created by Pete Bowsher have been erected in the Woodland Park. There are fourteen sculptures reflecting the animals and plants of the park.

== Suicide location ==
The hill's summit has become well-known as a location for suicides. In 2015 it became "highlighted as a national area of concern for completed suicides". That same year, 20-year-old Forfar Athletic player Jack Syme committed suicide at Kinnoull Hill.

In early January 2002, Daniela Smith, a 31-year-old mother-of-two, pushed her infant children off the hill's summit while they were strapped in their pushchair, before throwing herself off. Their bodies were discovered on a ledge about 100 feet (30 m) below the summit on 15 January.

The bodies of two men were found below the hill in 2014.

== Namesakes ==
The Kinnoull Campus of De La Salle College in Melbourne, Australia, is named after this hill. The property previously on the site of the College, built in 1856 by Sir James Palmer, was renamed Kinnoull by Sir Alexander Stewart (1874-1956) (former chairman of BHP), who was born near Kinnoull Hill.

Abernyte Brewery released a beer called Kinnoull Red, named for the hill.

== See also ==
- Deuchny Wood
