= Lord Gray =

Scottish title peerage

Lordship of Gray
- Gules, a Lion rampant within a Bordure engrailed Argent, over all a Label of two-points Or, each point charged gyronny of eight Or and Sable
- Creation date: 5 July 1445
- Created by: James II
- Peerage: Peerage of Scotland
- First holder: Andrew Gray
- Present holder: Andrew Godfrey Diarmid Stuart Campbell-Gray, 23rd Lord Gray
- Heir apparent: Alexander Godfrey Edward Diarmid Campbell-Gray, Master of Gray
- Seats: Airds Bay House, Taynuilt, Argyllshire

Lord Gray is a title in the Peerage of Scotland. The Barony of Gray was created circa July 1445 for the Scottish diplomat and politician Sir Andrew Gray. The first Lord Gray was a hostage in England for the good conduct of James I of Scotland from 1424 to 1427, and was one of the knights who accompanied Lady Margaret Stewart to France for her marriage to the Dauphin of France in 1436.

He was also a Commissioner to England between 1449 and 1451, Master of the Household to James II of Scotland in 1452, and a Warden of the Marches in 1459. In June 1489 King James IV granted to Andrew, Lord Gray, the lands and Barony of Lundie.

Sir Andrew Gray's descendant, the seventh Lord, was granted a new patent with remainder to William Gray, husband of his only daughter Anne, and his heirs male, and in failure thereof to William Gray's father Sir William Gray, and his heirs male whatsoever. He was succeeded according to the new patent by his grandson, the eighth Lord, the son of William and Anne Gray. In 1707 he also obtained a new patent, with the precedency of 1445, and with remainder to John Gray, husband of his daughter Marjory, and the heirs of their bodies, and, in failure thereof, to the elder heir female.

Lord Gray was succeeded already in his own lifetime by his son-in-law John Gray, the ninth Lord. His great-grandson, the fourteenth Lord, was a Scottish representative peer from 1812 to 1842. His son, the fifteenth Lord, was also a Scottish Representative Peer and sat in the House of Lords from 1842 to 1867. He died childless and was succeeded according to the patent of 1707 by his sister, Madelina Gray. She never married and on her death the title passed to her niece Margaret Murray. When she died in 1878 the Lordship was inherited by her cousin George Stuart, 14th Earl of Moray, who became the 18th Lord Gray as well. He was a descendant of Hon. Jean Gray, eldest daughter of the eleventh Lord Gray.

However, on his death the earldom and lordship separated, with the earldom being inherited by a male cousin. The lordship of Gray was passed on to (according to a decision by the Committee for Privileges in the House of Lords) Eveleen Smith, daughter of Lady Jane Pounden, daughter of Francis Stuart, 10th Earl of Moray. In 1897 Lady Gray, her husband James McLaren Smith and her children (among then the famous designer Eileen Gray), assumed by Royal licence the additional surname of Gray.

She was succeeded by her son, the twentieth Lord, and on his death in 1919 the title passed to his sister Ethel Eveleen Campbell, wife of Henry Tufnell Campbell, who both assumed by Royal licence the additional surname of Gray the following year. As of 2017 the title is held by her great-grandson, the twenty-third Lord Gray, who succeeded his father in 2003.

The family seat is Airds Bay House, near Taynuilt, Argyllshire.

== Lords Gray (1445) ==
- Andrew Gray, 1st Lord Gray (1390–1469)
- Andrew Gray, 2nd Lord Gray (d. 1514)
- Patrick Gray, 3rd Lord Gray (d. 1541)
- Patrick Gray, 4th Lord Gray (d. 1584)
- Patrick Gray, 5th Lord Gray(1538–1608)
- Patrick Gray, 6th Lord Gray (d. 1611)
- Andrew Gray, 7th Lord Gray (d. 1663)
- Patrick Gray, 8th Lord Gray (d. 1711)
- John Gray, 9th Lord Gray (d. 1724)
- John Gray, 10th Lord Gray (1683–1738)
- John Gray, 11th Lord Gray (1716–1782)
- Charles Gray, 12th Lord Gray (1752–1786)
- William John Gray, 13th Lord Gray (1754–1807)
- Francis Gray, 14th Lord Gray (1765–1842)
- John Gray, 15th Lord Gray (1798–1867)
- Madelina Gray, 16th Lady Gray (1799–1869)
- Margaret Murray, 17th Lady Gray (1821–1878)
- George Philip Stuart, 14th Earl of Moray, 18th Lord Gray (1816–1895)
- Eveleen Smith-Gray, 19th Lady Gray (1841–1918)
- James McLaren Stuart Gray, 20th Lord Gray (1864–1919)
- Ethel Eveleen Gray-Campbell, 21st Lady Gray (1866–1946)
- Angus Campbell-Gray, 22nd Lord Gray (1931–2003)
- Andrew Godfrey Diarmid Stuart Campbell-Gray, 23rd Lord Gray (b. 1964)

The heir apparent is the present holder's son the Hon. Alexander Godfrey Edward Diarmid Campbell-Gray, Master of Gray (b. 1996).

== Arms ==
Coat of arms of Lord Gray
| Coronet Coronet of a Baron Crest An Anchor in pale Or. Escutcheon Gules, a Lion rampant within a Bordure engrailed Argent, over all a Label of two-points Or, each point charged gyronny of eight Or and Sable. Supporters On either side a Lion guardant Gules, charged with a Label of two-points Or, each point charged gyronny of eight Or and Sable. Motto ANCHOR FAST ANCHOR |

== See also ==
- Earl of Moray
- Earl Grey

== Literary links ==
The Master of Gray trilogy, by Nigel Tranter are historical novels recounting the life and times of Patrick, 6th Lord Gray, arch conspirator and power behind the throne of the young James VI of Scotland. Hodder and Stoughton, 1961.

== Bibliography ==
- Hesilrige, Arthur G. M. (1921). Debrett's Peerage and Titles of courtesy. 160A, Fleet street, London, UK: Dean & Son. p. 420.
- Burke's Peereage, Baronetage and Knightage. London, 1949; 99th edition, p. 876
- Kidd, Charles, Williamson, David (editors). Debrett's Peerage and Baronetage (1990 edition). New York: St Martin's Press, 1990,
- Leigh Rayment's Peerage Pages – Peerages beginning with "G" (part 3)
