= Kinfauns, Perth and Kinross =

Coordinates: 56.38992°N 3.3501611°W

Kinfauns
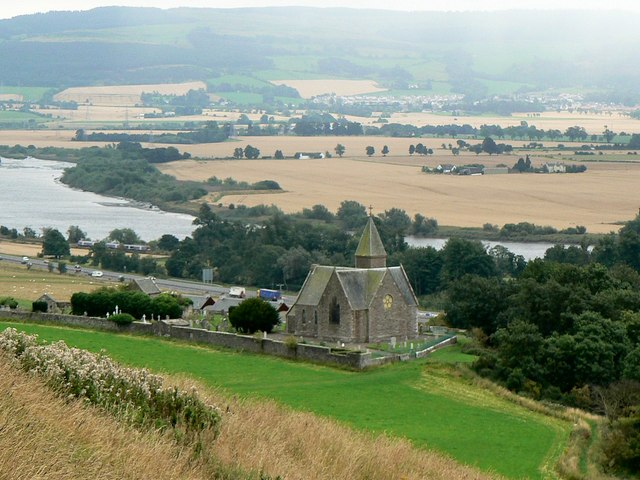
- Looking down to Kinfauns Parish Church from near Deuchny Wood, with Fife in view beyond the River Tay

- Location within Perth and Kinross
- Council area: Perth and Kinross
- Lieutenancy area: Perth and Kinross
- Country: Scotland
- Sovereign state: United Kingdom
- Post town: PERTH
- Postcode district: PH2
- Dialling code: 01738
- Police: Scotland
- Fire: Scottish
- Ambulance: Scottish
- UK Parliament: Perth and North Perthshire
- Scottish Parliament: North Tayside; North East Scotland

Kinfauns is a village in Perth and Kinross, Scotland, at the western end of the Carse of Gowrie, 3 miles (4.8 km) east of Perth.

== Background ==
The village is home to Kinfauns Castle, a Category A listed building erected in 1825. and the grounds are included in the Inventory of Gardens and Designed Landscapes in Scotland.

The parish was the home of Loch Kaitre, which stood on the site of the Manse of Kinfauns. It was still present in 1838, but in the mid-19th century, a sinkhole appeared and the manse fell in, witnessed by the minister, who had just left his home en route to the church. The loch remained for a few generations, before being drained by a tenant later in the century for agricultural use of the land beneath it.

From 1847 to 1950 the village was served by Kinfauns railway station, originally on the Dundee and Perth Railway.

== See also ==
- List of listed buildings in Kinfauns, Perth and Kinross
