= Carnac stones =

Set of megalithic sites in Brittany, France

Megaliths of Carnac and of the shores of Morbihan
UNESCO World Heritage Site
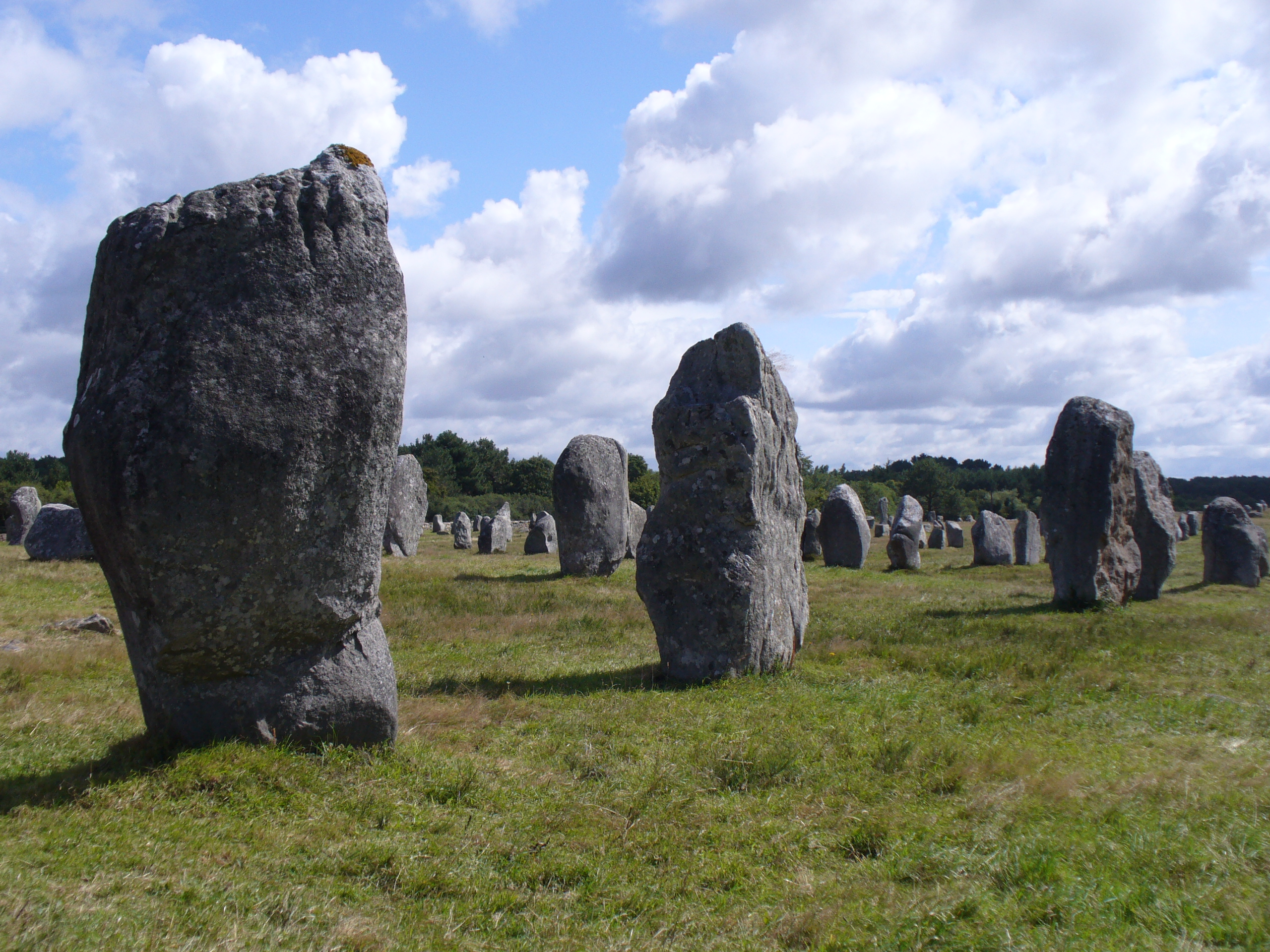
- Le Menec alignments

- Location within France
- Location: Brittany, France
- Criteria: i, iv
- Reference: 1725
- Inscription: 2025 (47th Session)
- Coordinates: 47°35′50″N 3°03′50″W

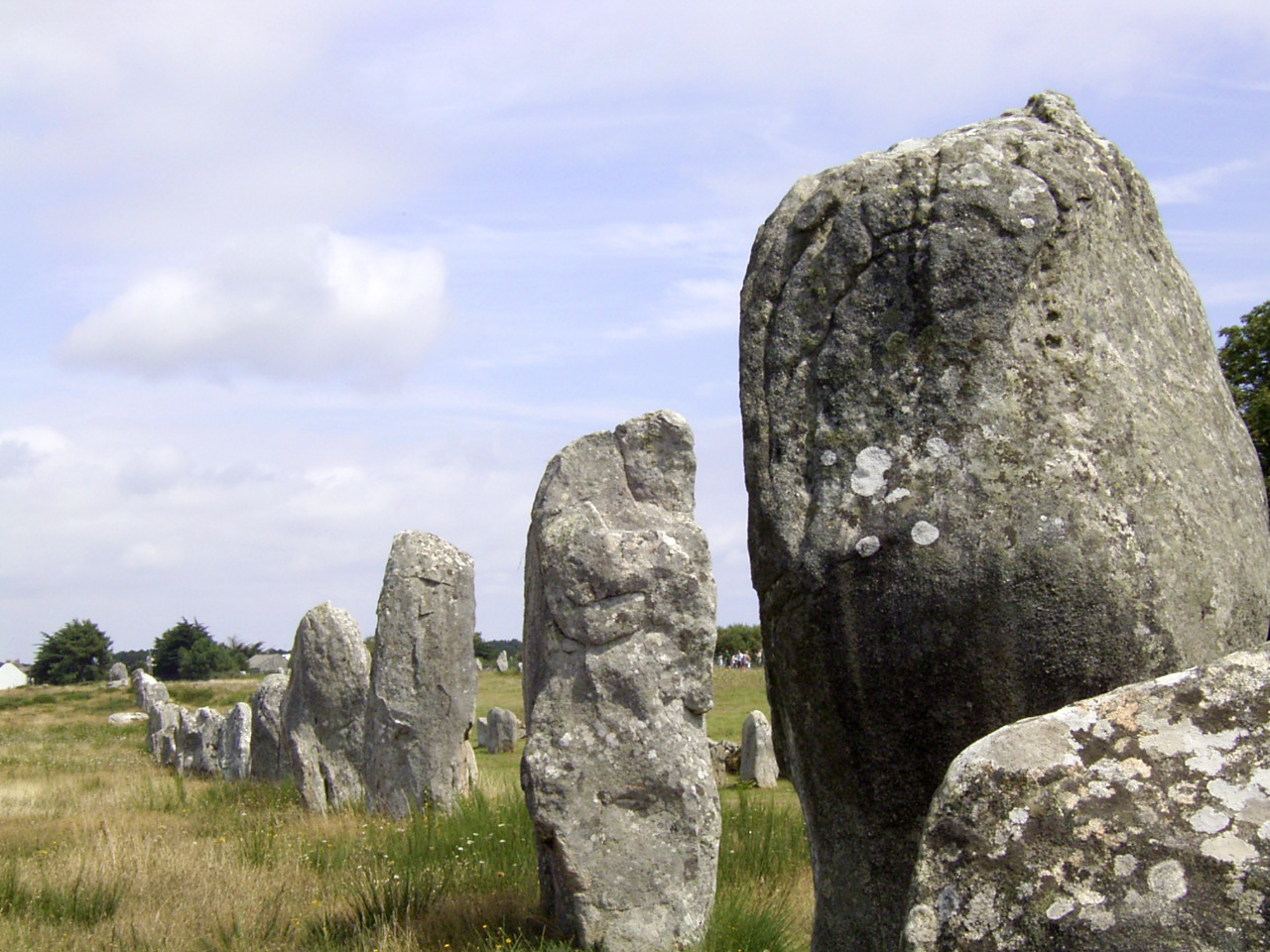
The Ménec alignments, the best-known megalithic site among the Carnac stones

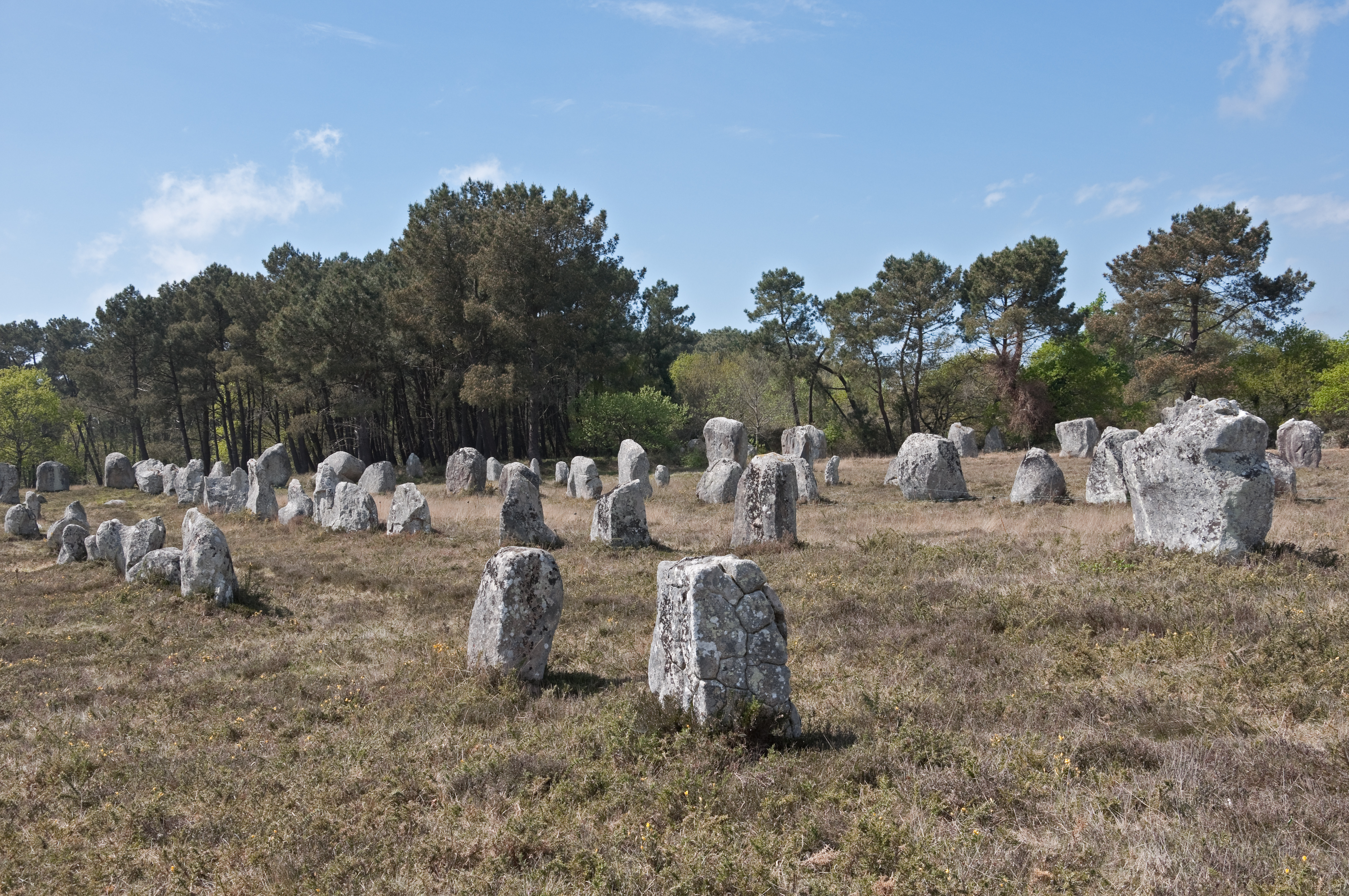
Stones in the Kerlescan alignments

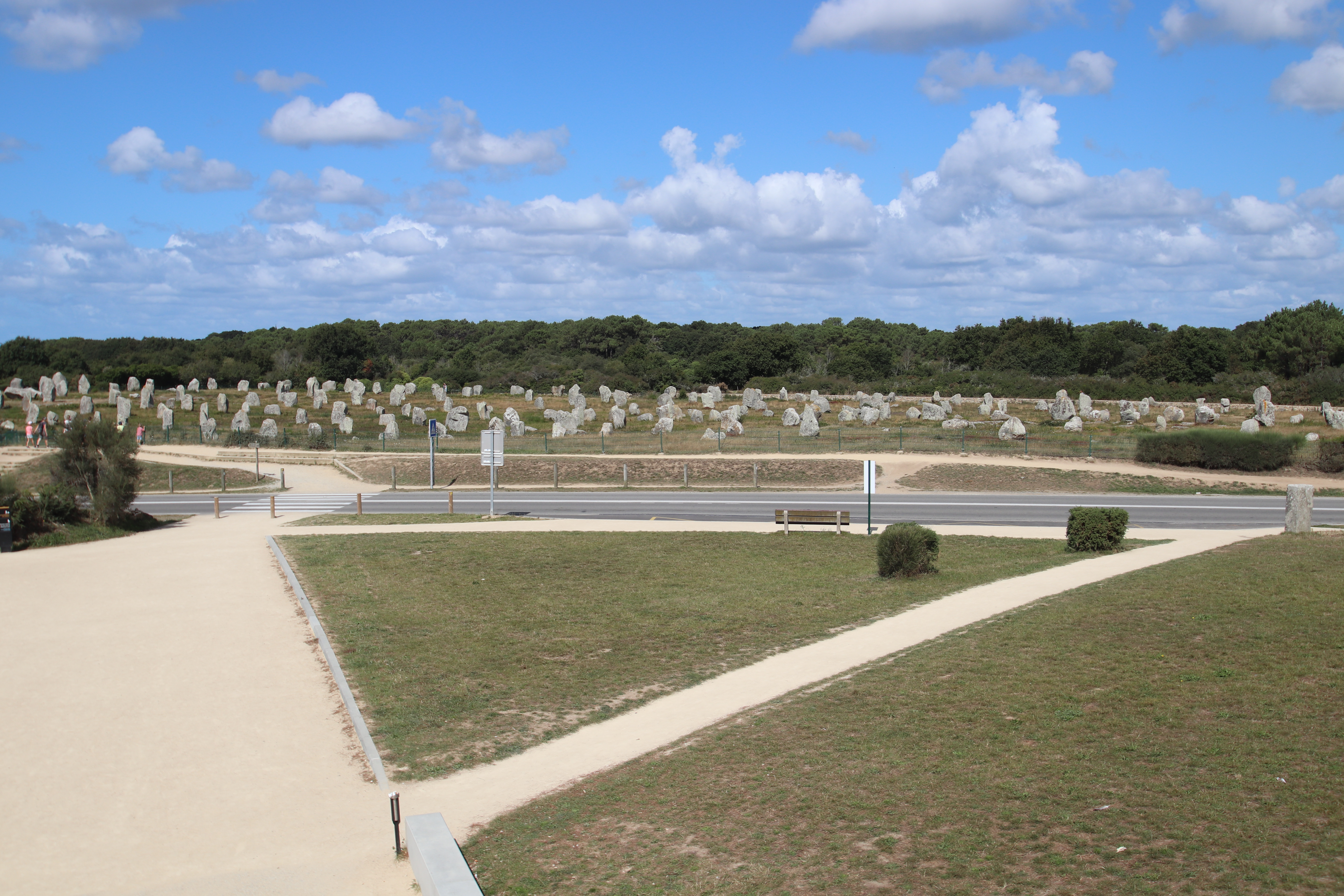
Megalithic alignments at Carnac

The Carnac stones (Breton: Steudadoù Karnag) are an exceptionally dense collection of megalithic sites near the south coast of Brittany in northwestern France, consisting of stone alignments (rows), dolmens (stone tombs), tumuli (burial mounds), and single menhirs. More than 3,000 prehistoric standing stones were hewn from local granite and erected by the pre-Celtic people of Brittany and form the largest such collection in the world. Most of the stones are within the Breton municipality of Carnac, but some to the east are within neighboring La Trinité-sur-Mer. Numerous megaliths and tumuli are also found in the surrounding areas, such as at Locmariaquer and Arzon, and on islands in the Gulf of Morbihan (e.g. Gavrinis). The stones were erected at some stage during the Neolithic period, probably around 3300 BC, but some may date to as early as 4500 BC.

Although the stones date from 4500–3300 BC, modern beliefs associated them with first century AD Roman and later Christian occupations. A Christian legend associated with the stones held that they were pagan soldiers in pursuit of Pope Cornelius when he turned them to stone. Brittany has its own local versions of the Arthurian cycle. Local tradition similarly claims that the reason they stand in such perfectly straight lines is that they are a Roman legion turned to stone by Merlin the Wizard.

In recent centuries, many of the sites have been neglected, with reports of dolmens being used as sheep shelters, chicken sheds, or even ovens. Even more commonly, stones have been removed to make way for roads, or as building materials. The continuing management of the sites remains a controversial topic.

According to Neil Oliver's BBC documentary A History of Ancient Britain, the alignments were built by hunter-gatherer people ("These weren't erected by Neolithic farmers, but by Mesolithic hunters"). That would place them in a different category from Stonehenge in England, which has been claimed to be the work of Early European Farmers. The question of which people Carnac stones are to be attributed to is still debated.

== Alignments ==
There are three major groups of stone rows – Ménec, Kermario and Kerlescan. They may have once formed a single group but have been split up as stones were removed for other purposes. Together they trace a contour line, around 20 meters above sea level.

The standing stones are made of weathered granite from local outcroppings that once extensively covered the area.

=== Ménec alignments ===
Eleven converging rows of menhirs stretching for 1,165 by 100 metres (3,822 by 328 feet). There are what Alexander Thom considered to be the remains of stone circles at either end. According to the tourist office there is a "cromlech containing 71 stone blocks" at the western end and a very ruined cromlech at the eastern end. The largest stones, around 4 metres (13 feet) high, are at the wider, western end; the stones then become as small as 0.6 metres (2 feet 0 inches) high along the length of the alignment before growing in height again toward the extreme eastern end.

=== Kermario alignment ===
This fan-like layout recurs a little further along to the east in the Kermario (House of the Dead) alignment. It consists of 1029 stones in ten columns, about 1,300 m (4,300 ft) in length. A stone circle to the east end, where the stones are shorter, was revealed by aerial photography.

=== Kerlescan alignments ===
A smaller group of 555 stones, further to the east of the other two sites. It is composed of 13 lines with a total length of about 800 metres (2,600 ft), ranging in height from 80 cm (2 ft 7 in) to 4 m (13 ft). At the extreme west, where the stones are tallest, there is a stone circle which has 39 stones. There may also be another stone circle to the north.

=== Petit-Ménec alignments ===
A much smaller group, further east again of Kerlescan, falling within the commune of La Trinité-sur-Mer. These are now set in woods, and most are covered with moss and ivy.

==== Gallery ====
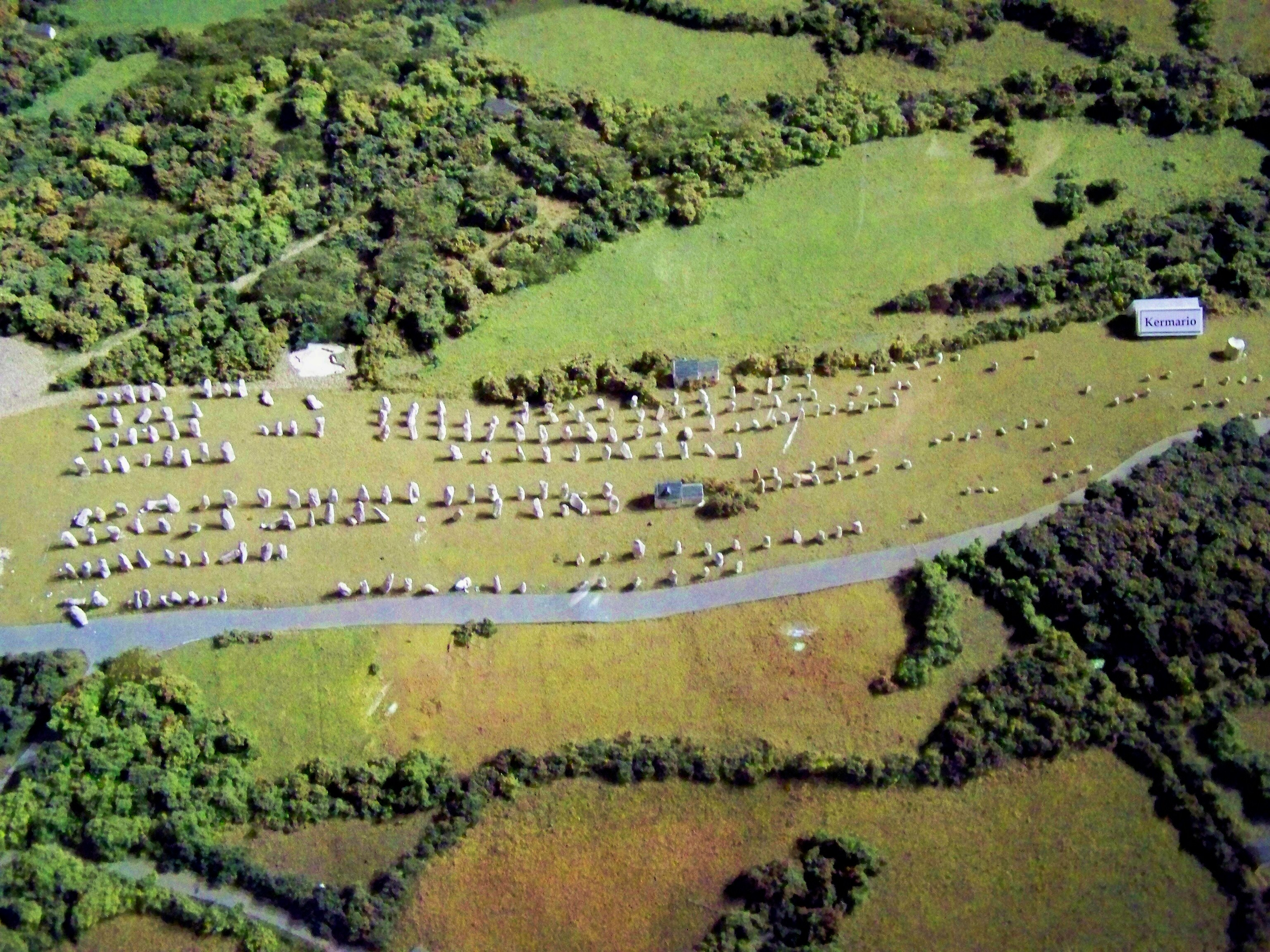
Model of the Kermario alignment

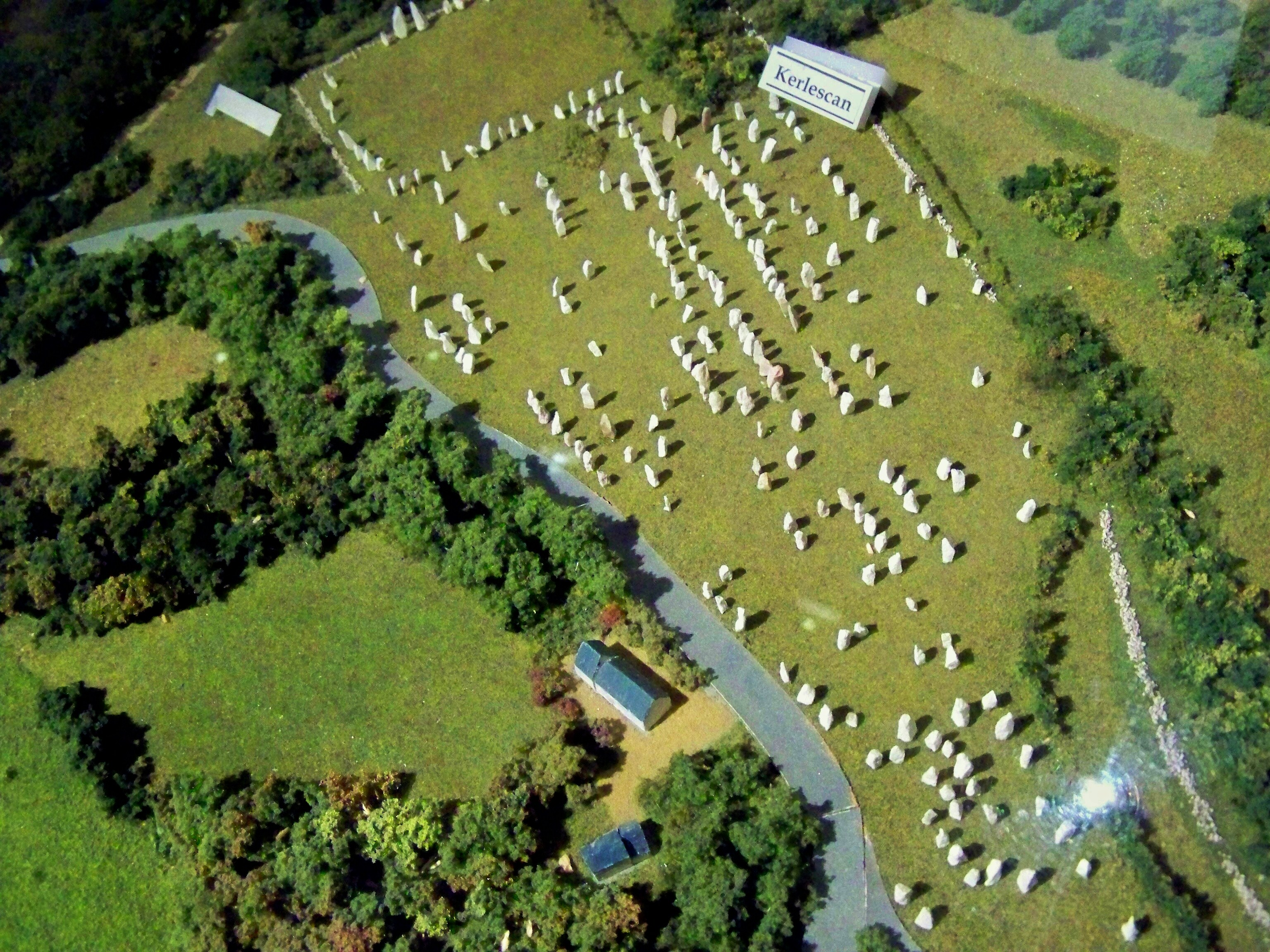
Model of the Kerlescan alignment

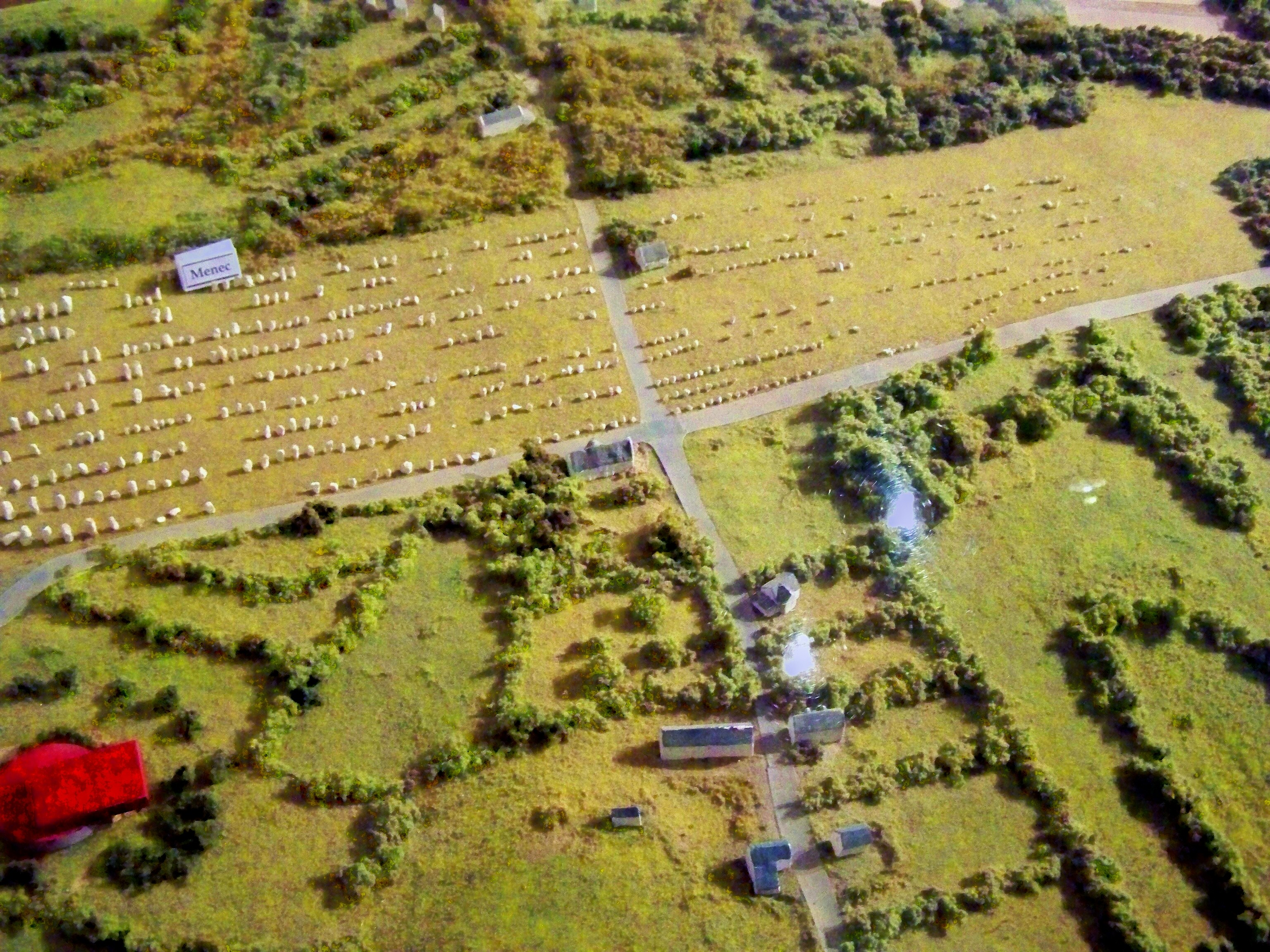
Model of the Ménec alignment

== Tumuli ==
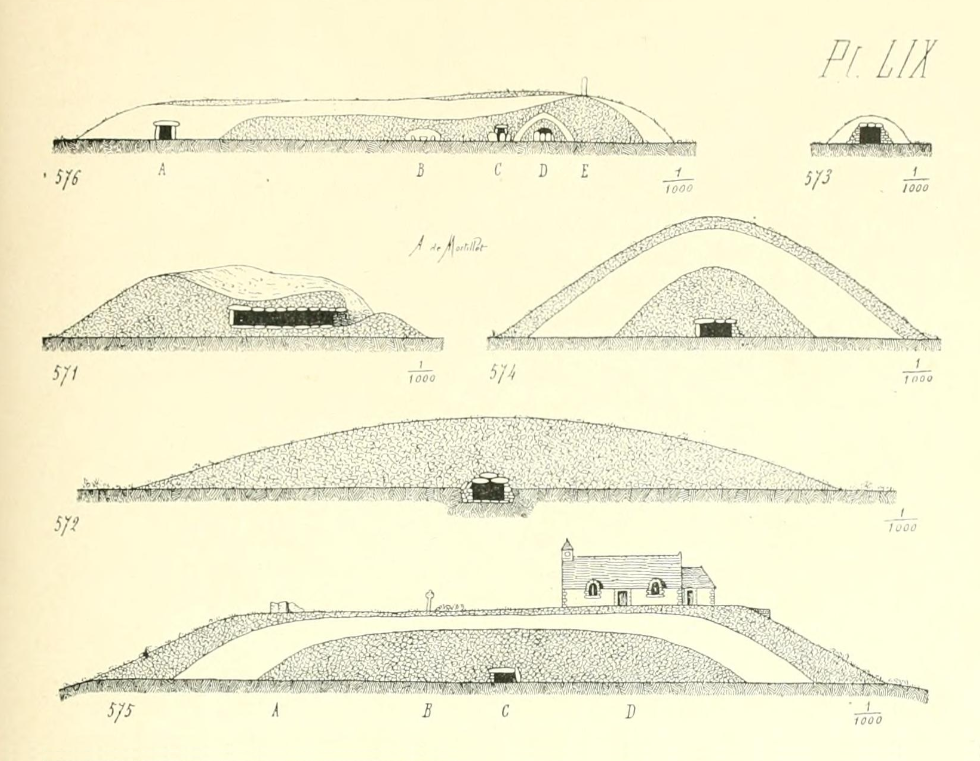
Diagram of megalithic burial mounds (tumuli) in the Carnac region

There are several tumuli, mounds of earth built up over a grave. In this area, they generally feature a passage leading to a central chamber which once held neolithic artifacts.

Three exceptionally large burial mounds are known from the Carnac and Morbihan area, dating from the mid-5th millennium BC and known collectively as 'Carnacéen tumuli': Saint-Michel, Tumiac and Mané-er-Hroëk. Each of these tumuli contained a megalithic burial chamber, containing the burial of only one individual, along with numerous large polished stone axeheads, stone arm-rings, and jewellery made from callaïs (variscite and turquoise). Scientific analyses have shown that many of the axeheads are made of jade from the Italian Alps, whilst the callaïs was imported from south-western Iberia. Archaeological evidence indicates that the callaïs was brought from Iberia by boat, across the Bay of Biscay, rather than along the coast or overland. Some of the Carnacéen jade axeheads are up to 46 cm in length and may have taken over a thousand hours to produce, on top of the time required to quarry the material and transport it to Carnac. The extraordinary nature of these burials, the scale of the tumuli, the logistics and effort involved, all indicate that these were the burials of extremely important elite individuals, that some researchers have described as "divine kings". The large-scale effort and organisation involved in the construction of megalithic monuments, such as the 20.6-metre-tall (68 ft) Grand Menhir of Er Grah, further suggests the existence of rulers or kings in the Carnac and Morbihan region. A similar situation has been described for the later megalithic culture in Ireland, which shows some close similarities to the megalithic culture in Brittany. Based on archaeological, DNA and ethnographic evidence it has been suggested that an elite male buried in the Newgrange passage grave, c. 3200 BC, may have been a "god-king" and part of a "dynastic elite". Similarities have also been noted with the Michelsberg culture in northeastern France and Germany (c. 4200 BC), which featured large tumulus burials within fortified settlements and the use of Alpine jade axes, all associated with the emergence of "high-ranking elites". Engravings on megalithic monuments in Carnac also feature numerous depictions of objects interpreted as symbols of authority and power, such as curved throwing weapons, axes and sceptres.

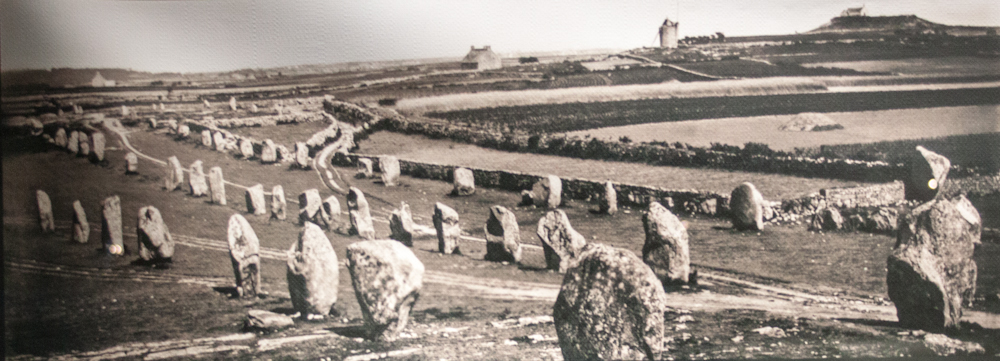
Le Menec alignments with the Saint-Michel tumulus in the distance

The Carnacéen tumuli were contemporary with the rich burials of the Varna culture in Bulgaria (c. 4500 BC), which contained more gold than all excavated sites from the rest of the world combined in the 5th millennium BC. The Varna burials attest to the existence of powerful elites in southeastern Europe at the same time as they appear in Carnac. Grave 43 of the Varna necropolis, which contained a single male buried with a sceptre and numerous gold ornaments, also contained an Alpine jade axehead.

=== Saint-Michel ===
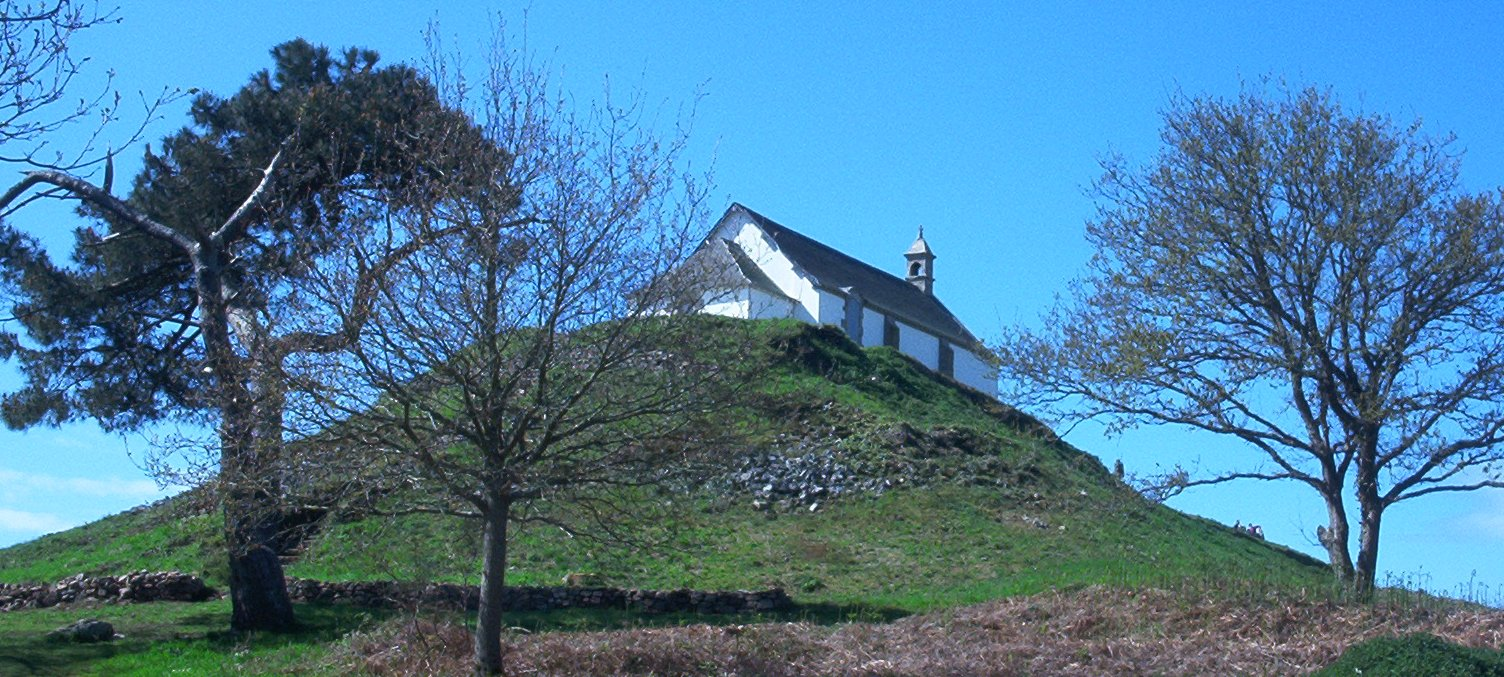
Tumulus of Saint-Michel

The tumulus of Saint-Michel was constructed between 5000 BCE and 3400 BCE. At its base it is 125 by 60 m (410 by 197 ft), and is 12 m (39 ft) high. It required 35,000 cubic metres (46,000 cu yd) of stone and earth. Its function was a tomb for the members of the ruling class. It contained various funerary objects, such as 15 stone chests, large jade axes, pottery, and callaïs jewellery, most of which are currently held by the Museum of Prehistory of Carnac. It was excavated in 1862 by René Galles with a series of vertical pits, digging down 8 m (26 ft). Le Rouzic also excavated it between 1900 and 1907, discovering the tomb and the stone chests.

A chapel was built on top in 1663 and was rebuilt in 1813, before being destroyed in 1923. The current building is an identical reconstruction of the 1663 chapel, built in 1926.

=== Tumiac ===
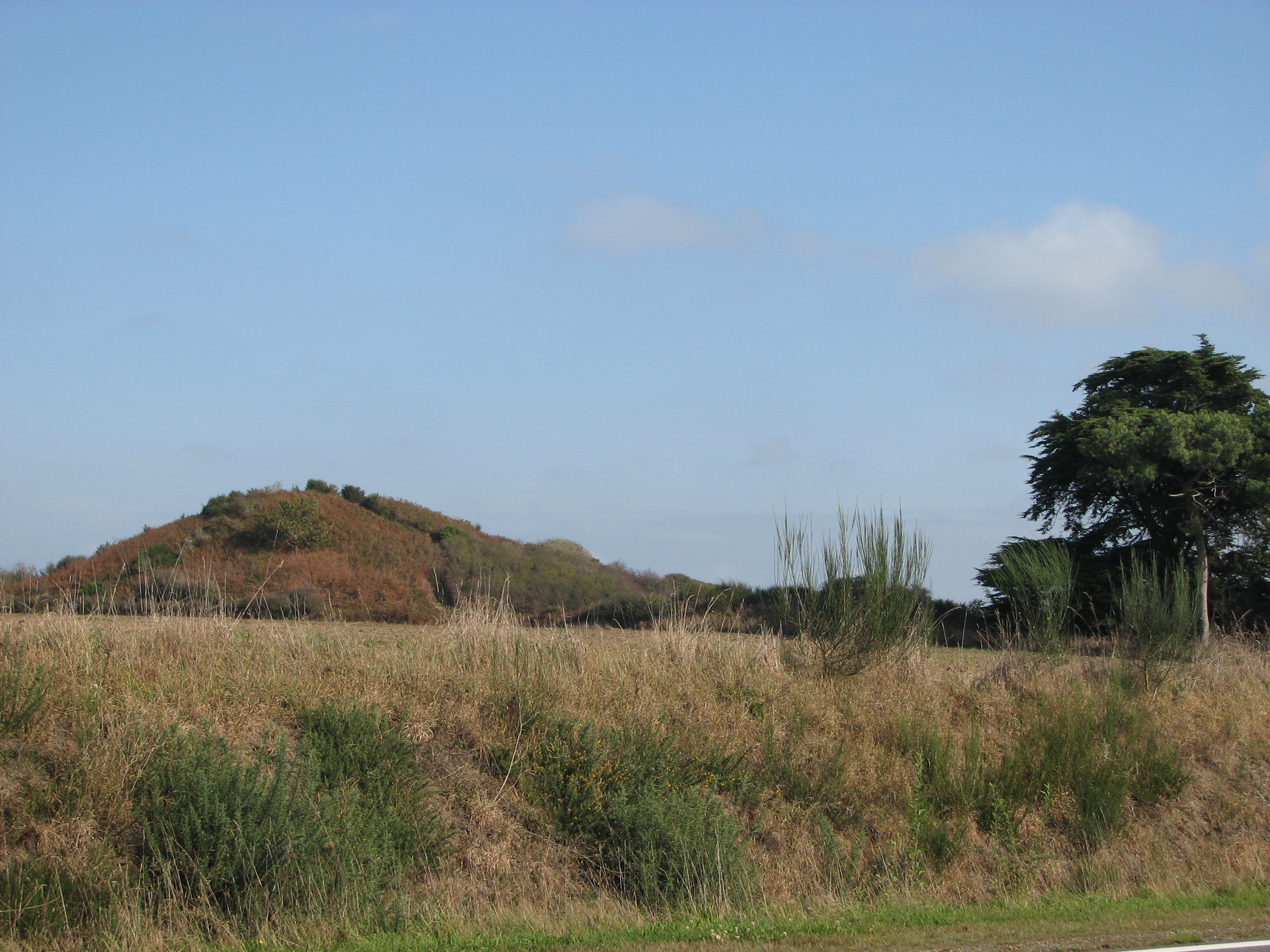
Tumulus of Tumiac

The tumulus of Tumiac is located in Arzon, in the Rhuys peninsula, south of the Gulf of Morbihan. It is also known as 'Caesar's mound' because, according to local legend, it served as an observatory for Julius Caesar during his war against the Veneti in 56 BC.

The site was excavated in 1853. The crater visible at the top of the tumulus corresponds to the vertical hole made at the time for its exploration. It was the subject of new excavations and work in 1934, which brought to light several secondary burials.

The tumulus, circular/elliptical in shape, is made up of layers of clay. It measures 50 m in diameter and 15 m in height. It contains a central rectangular burial chamber 4.40 m long, 2.40 m wide and 1.75 m high. This chamber is made up of three monolithic supports and is covered with a quartz slab 4.80 m long. It had a wooden floor and two engraved side slabs. The funerary chamber contained rich furniture consisting of 11 jadeite axes, 26 fibrolite axes and 249 callaïs beads. These objects are kept in the Archaeological Museum of Vannes. According to carbon-14 dating, the tumulus of Tumiac was erected between 4790 and 4530 BC.

The tumulus of Tumiac has been classified as a historical monument since 1923.

=== Mané-er-Hroëk ===
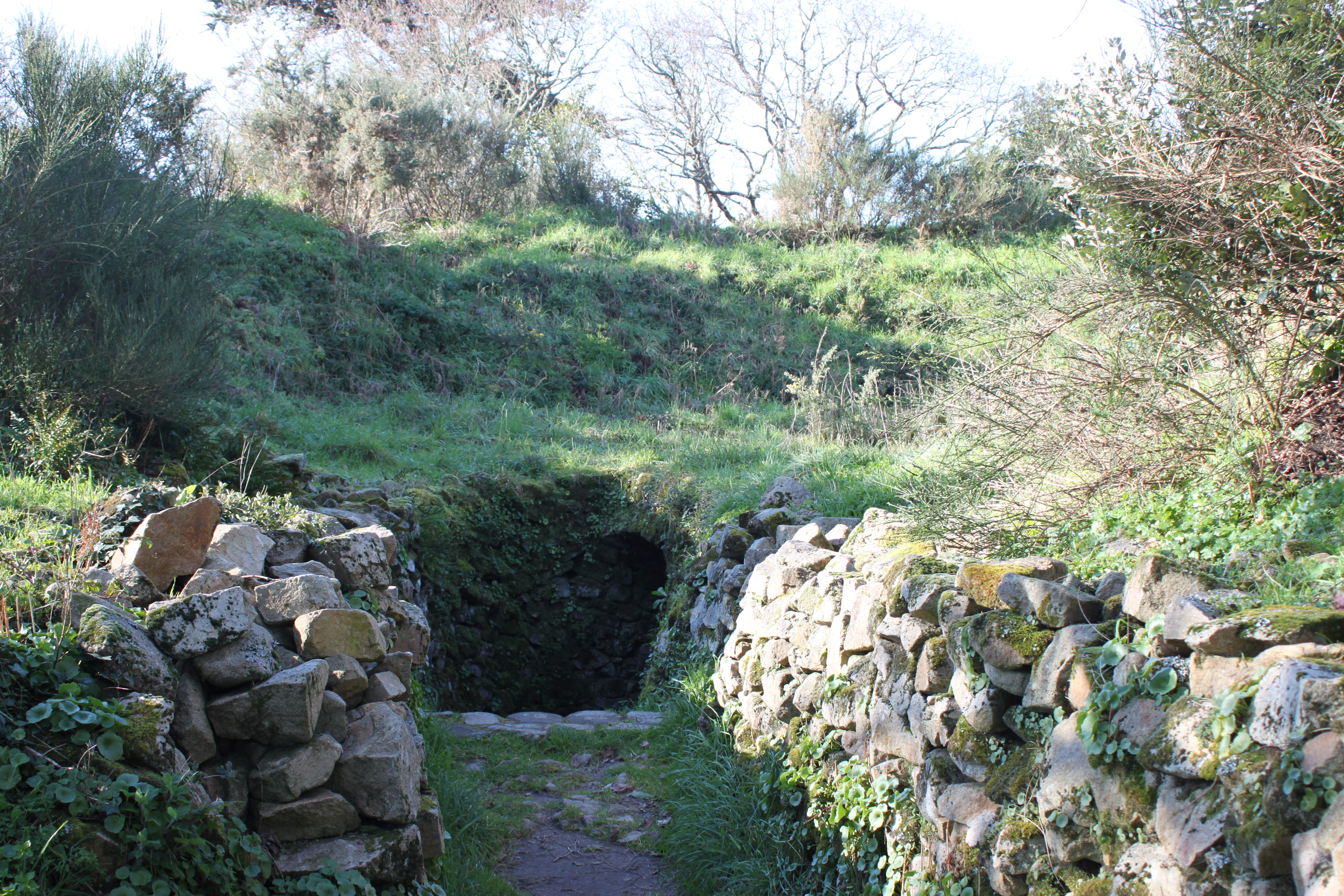
Entrance to the Mané-er-Hroëk burial chamber

The Tumulus of Mané-er-Hroëk (also known as the Tumulus du Ruyk) is located in Locmariaquer, Morbihan, immediately west of the hamlet of Er-Hroueg and about 1 km northeast of the Pierres Plates dolmen.

The tumulus comprises a rectangular burial vault of about 5 m by 3 m, covered with two roofing slabs, supporting a mound about 100 m long and 60 m wide. The tumulus rises to approximately 15 m above sea level, or almost 8 m above the natural ground. The current entrance, with a staircase, is a modern addition. An engraved stele, found broken into three pieces, stands next to the entrance.

The tumulus was excavated in 1863 by the Polymathic Society of Morbihan. These excavations led to the discovery of the vault and stele and brought to light 106 precious stone axes (the largest of which measures 46 cm), 49 callaïs beads and 9 callaïs pendants. These objects were subsequently deposited in the Archeological Museum of Vannes. The tumulus has been classified as a historical monument since 1889.

=== Moustoir ===
47.6119°N 3.0608°W Also known as Er Mané, it is a chamber tomb 85 m (279 ft) long, 35 m (115 ft) wide, and 5 m (16 ft) high. It has a dolmen at the west end, and two tombs at the east end. A small menhir, approximately 3 m (10 ft) high, is nearby.

== Grave goods ==
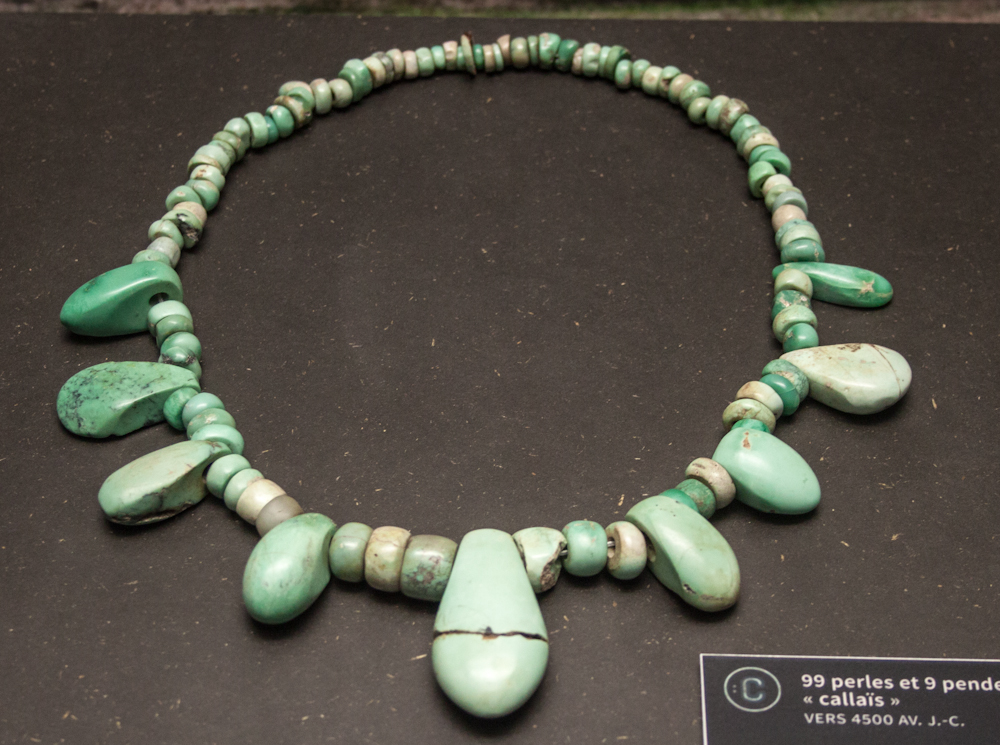
Callaïs from Saint-Michel

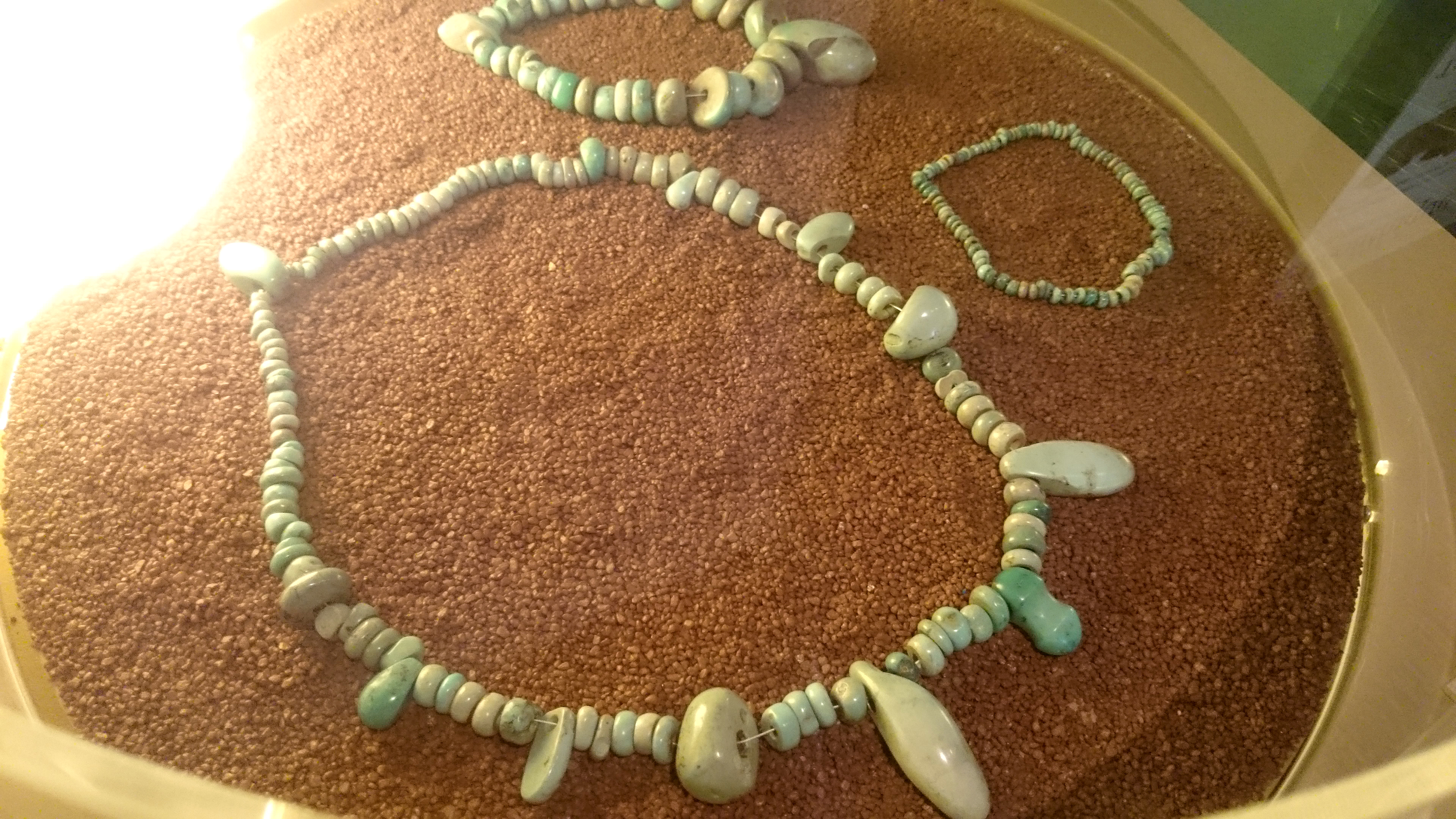
Callaïs from Tumiac

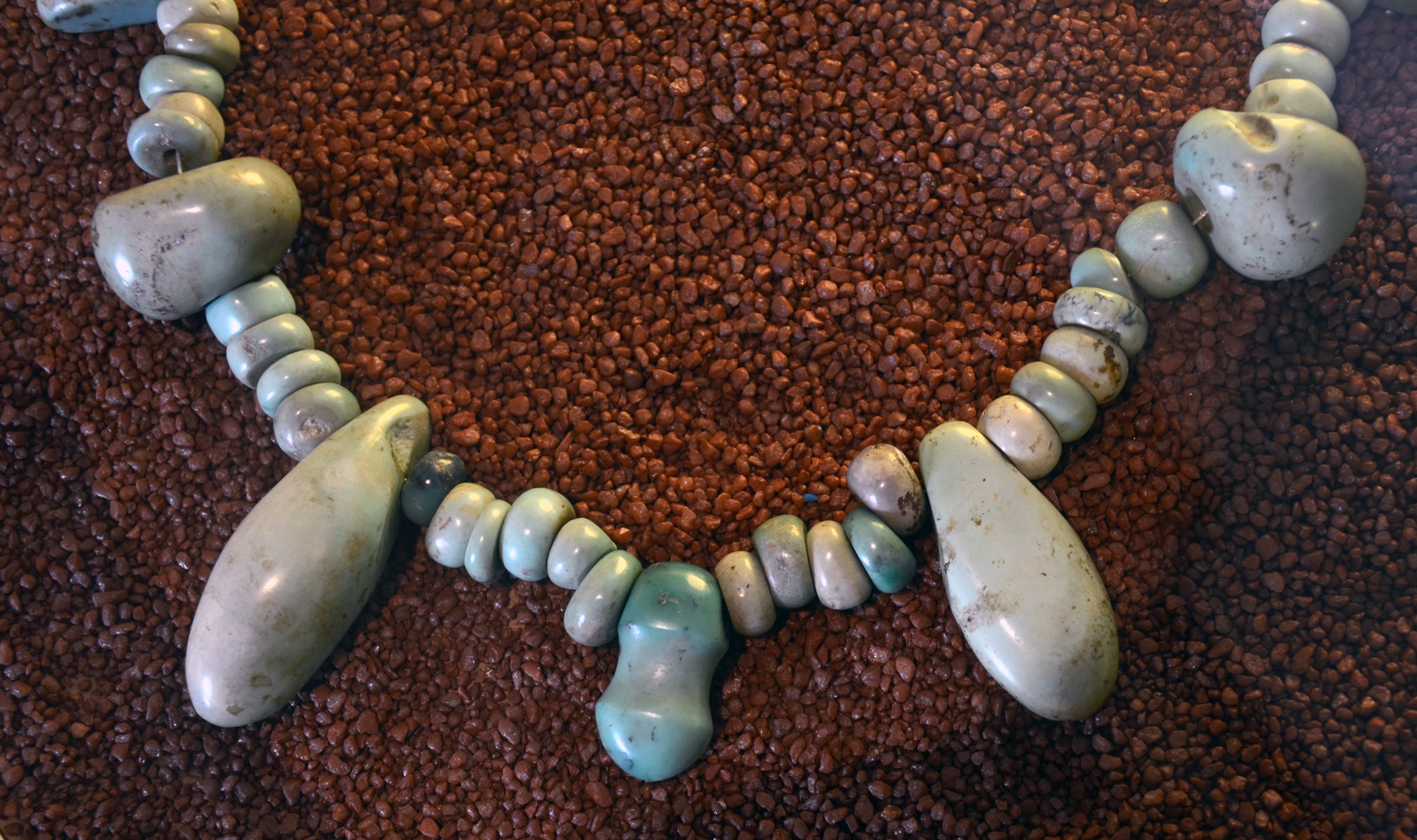
Tumiac

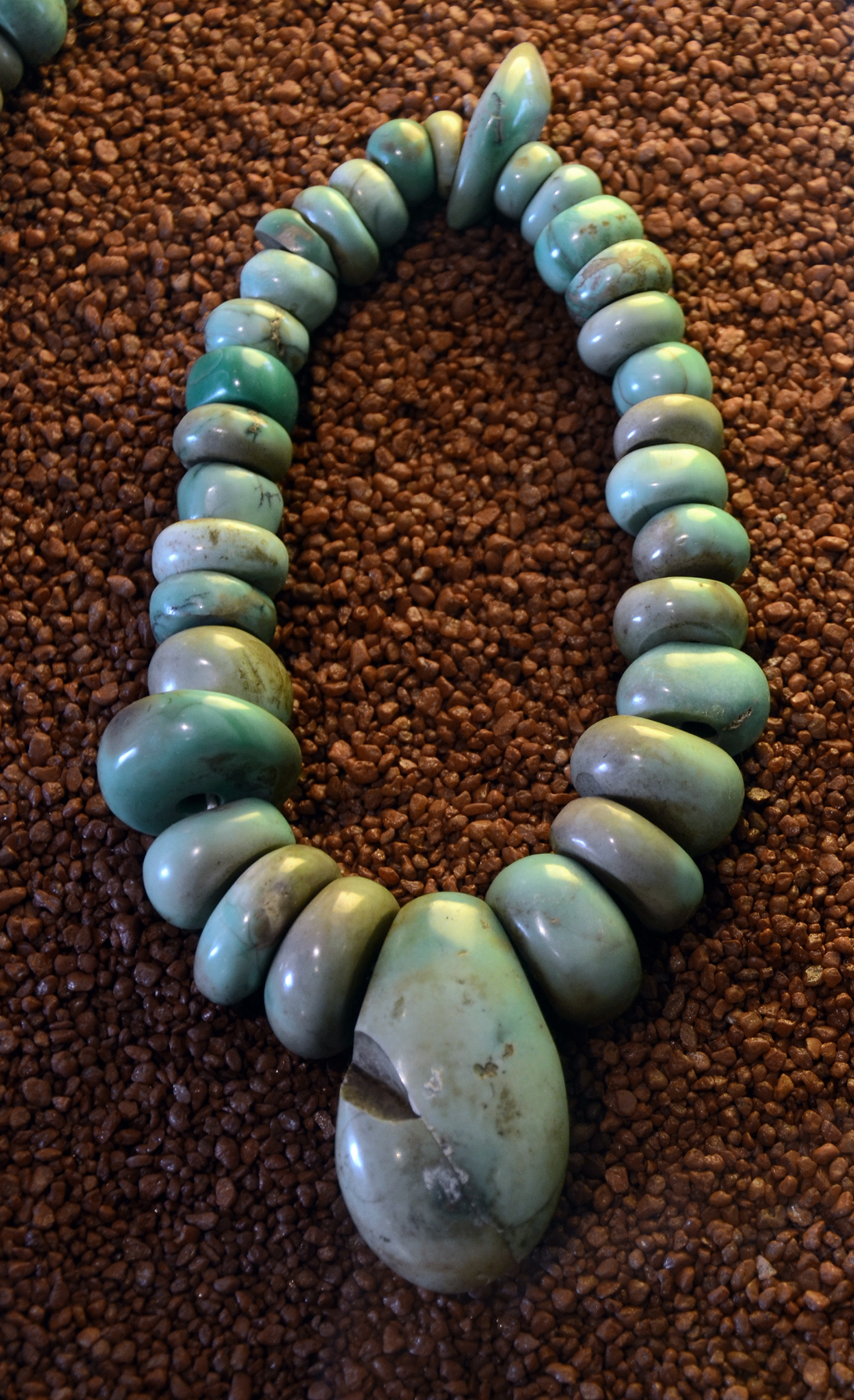
Tumiac

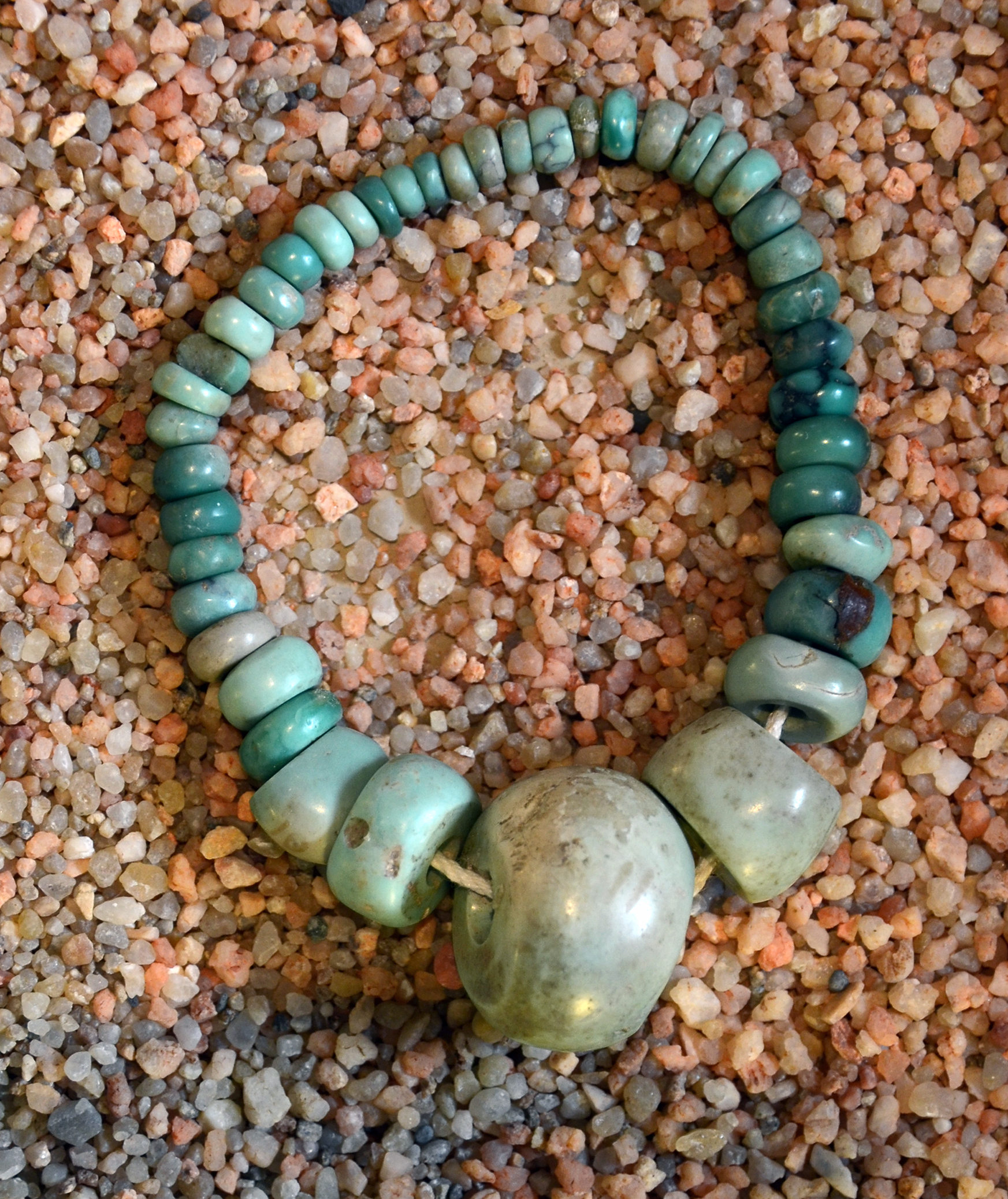
Mané-er-Hroëck

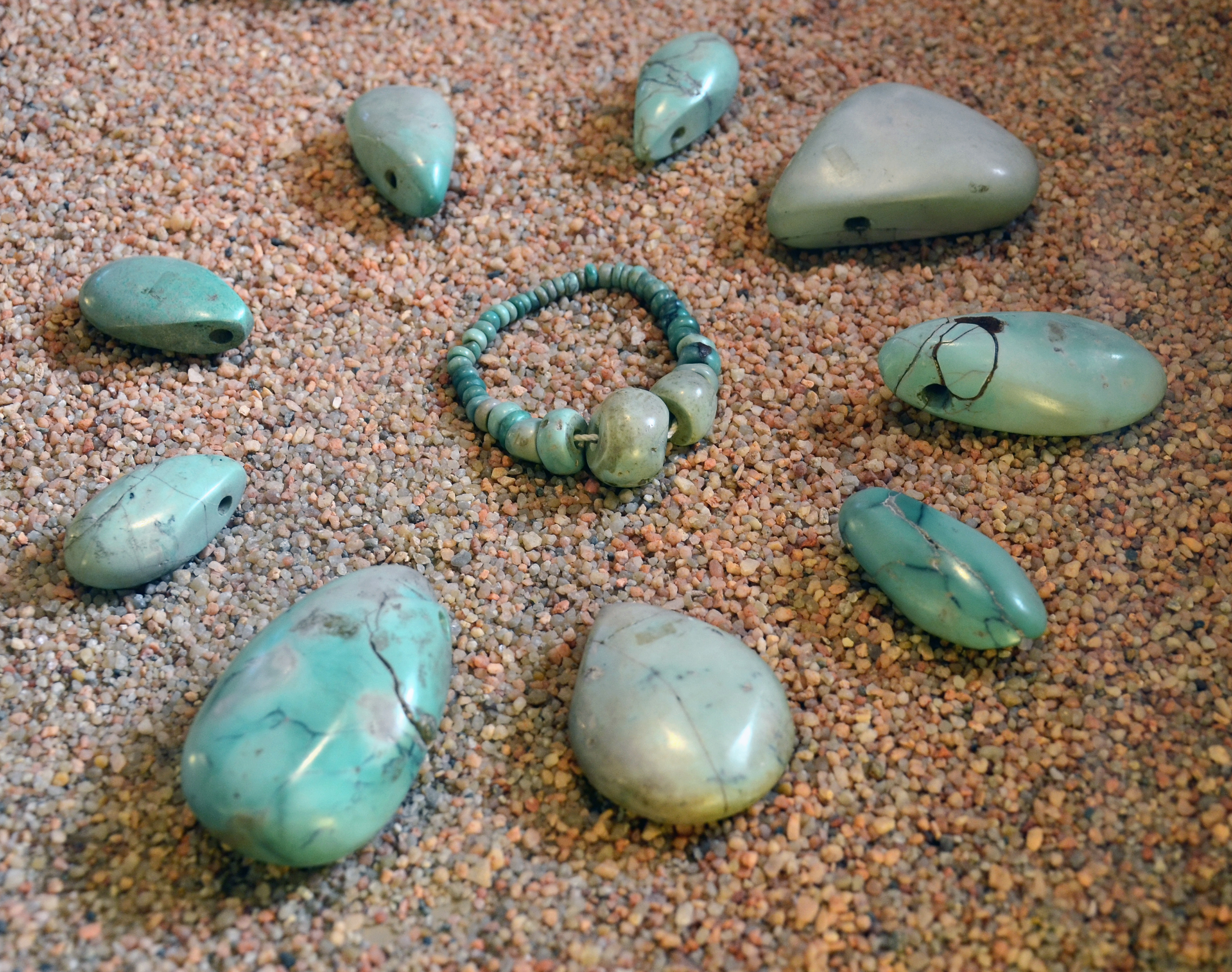
Mané-er-Hroëck

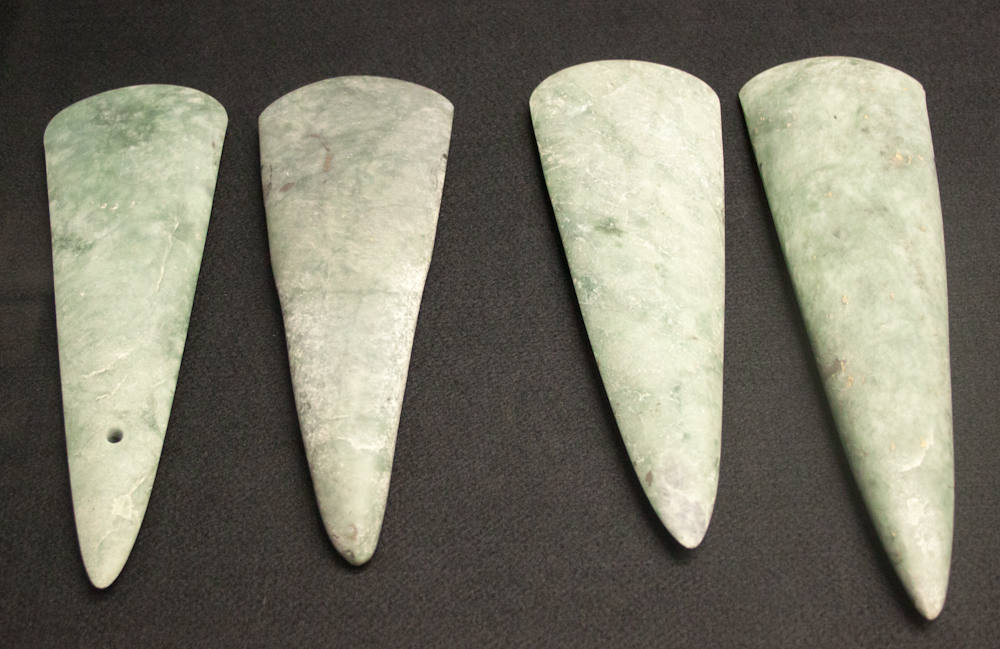
Jadeitite axes

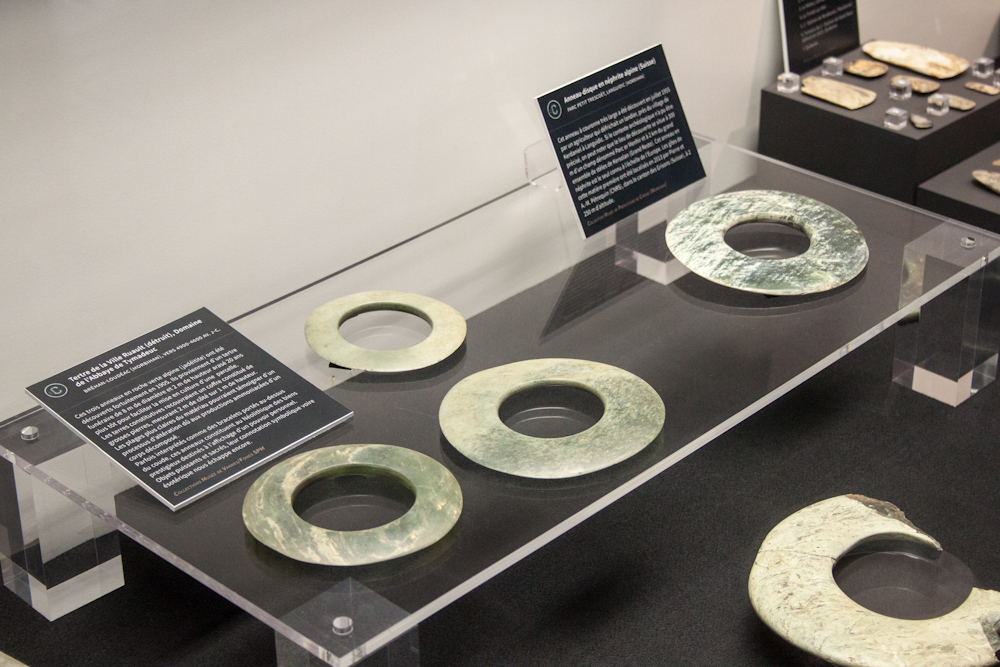
Stone rings

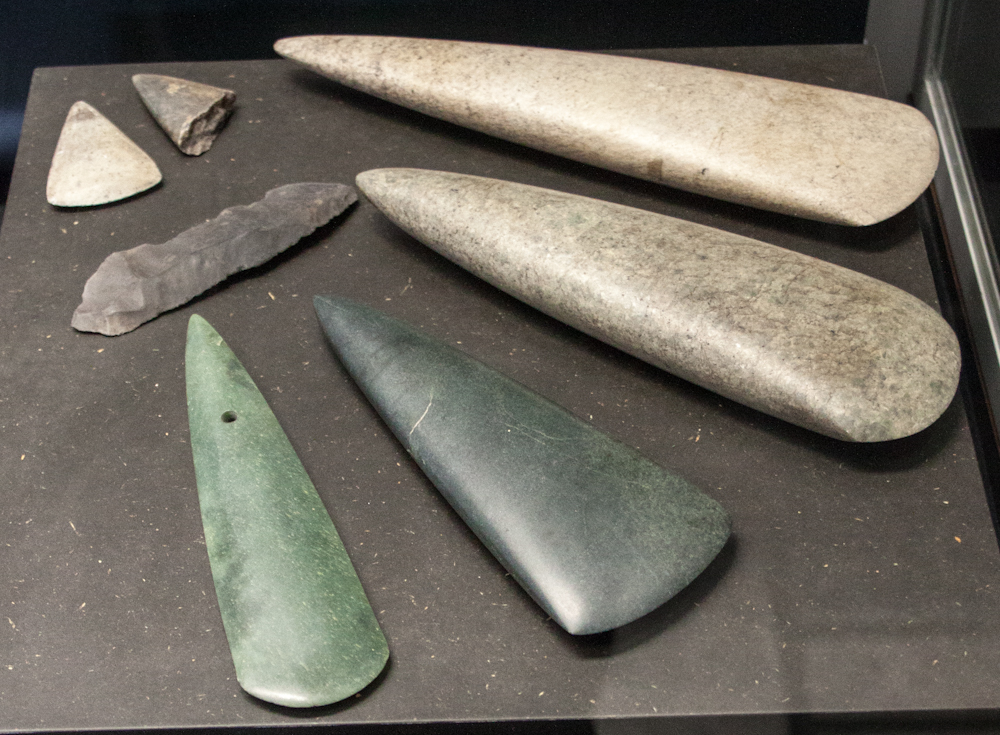
Polished stone axes

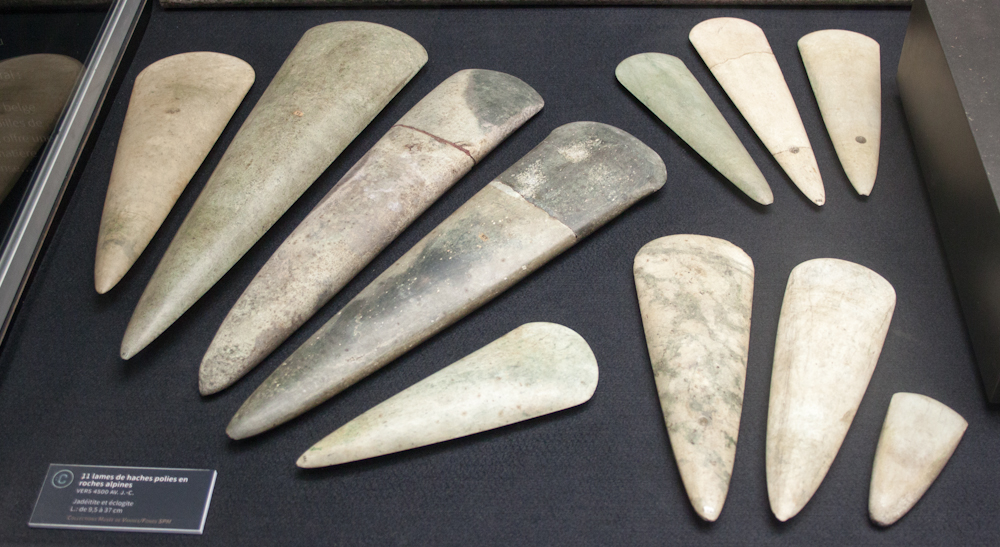
Jadeitite and eclogite axes from the Saint-Michel tumulus

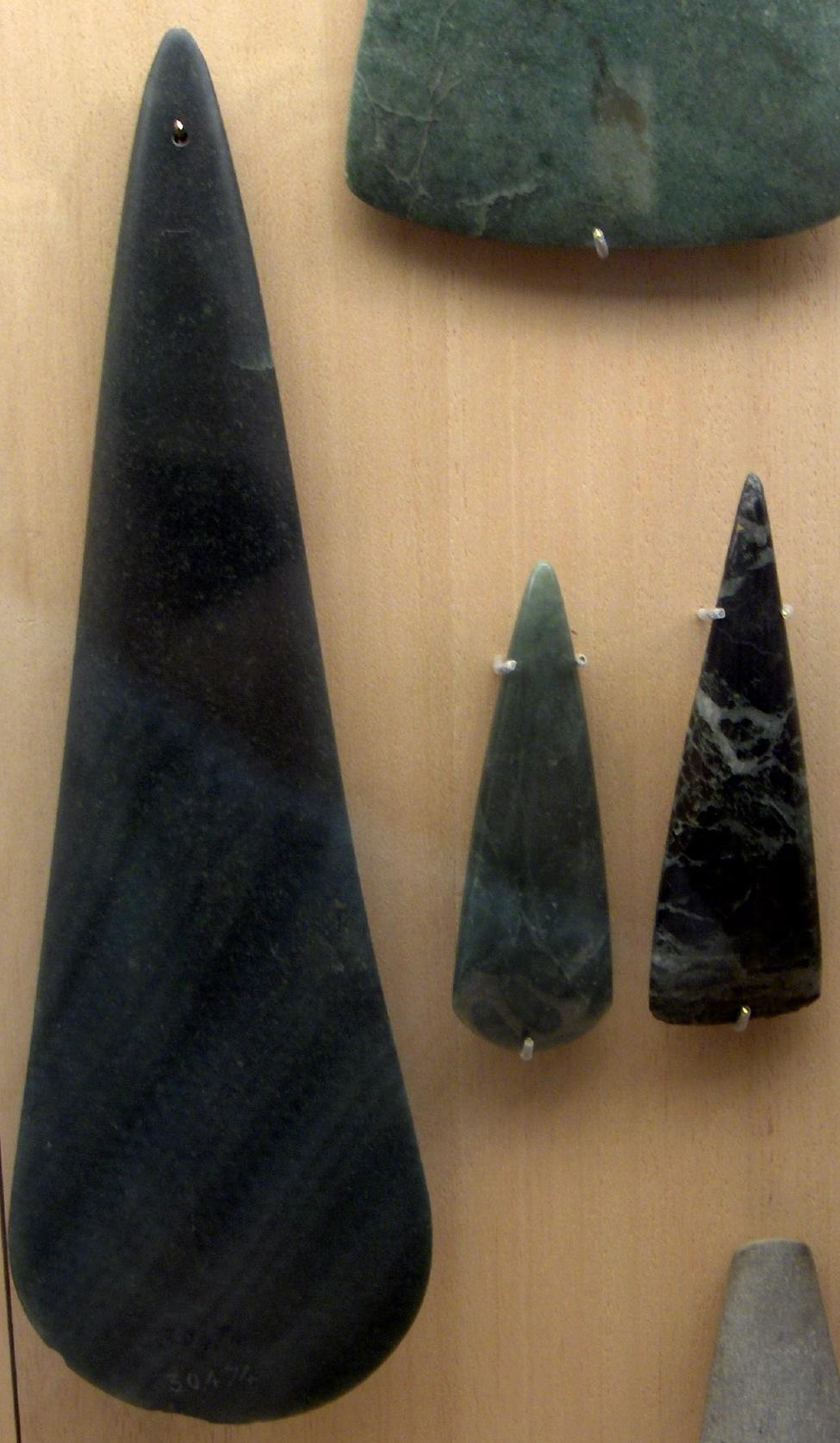
Jade axes

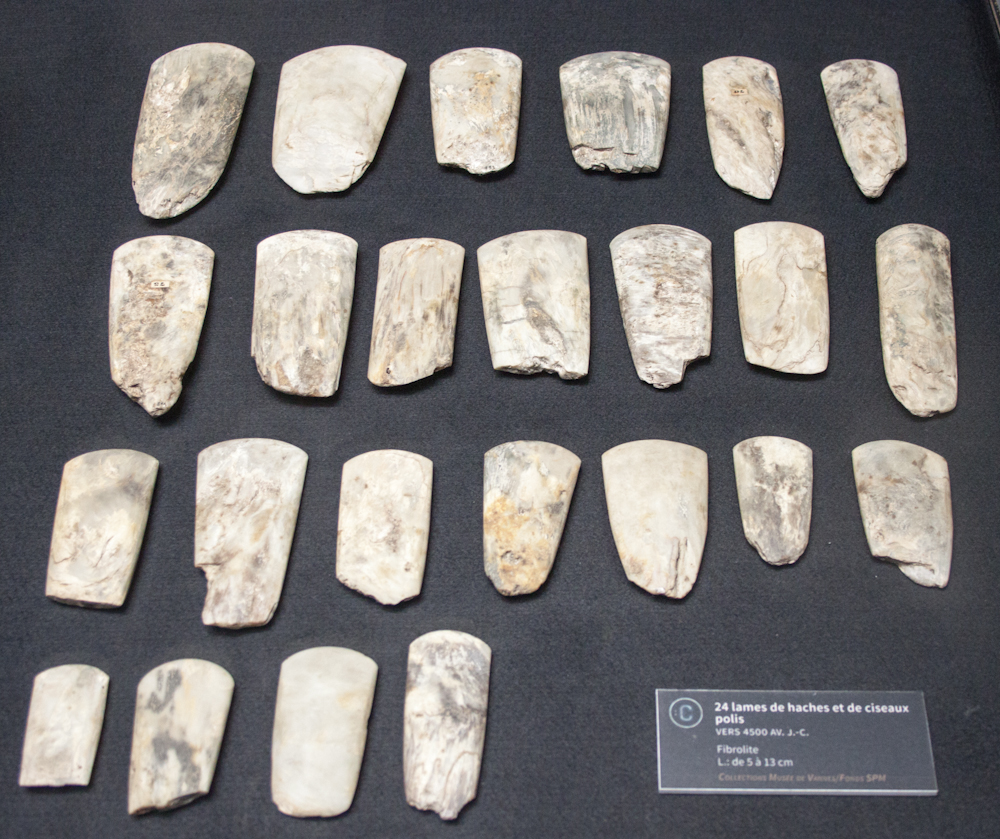
Broken stone axes

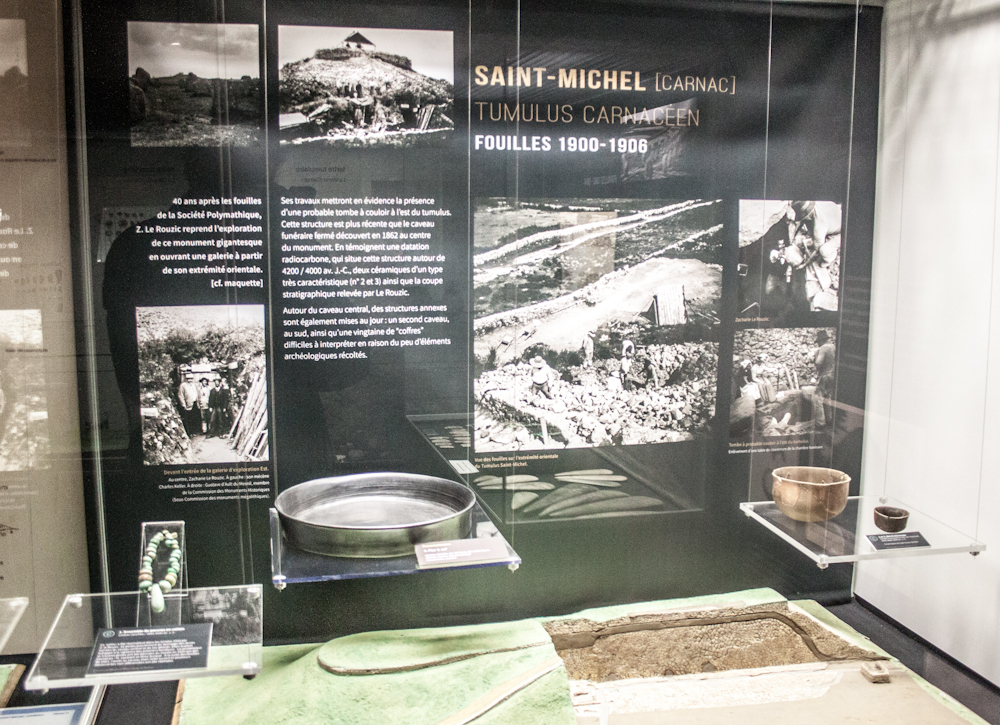
Documentation of the Saint-Michel excavations, and finds from the tumulus

== Dolmens ==
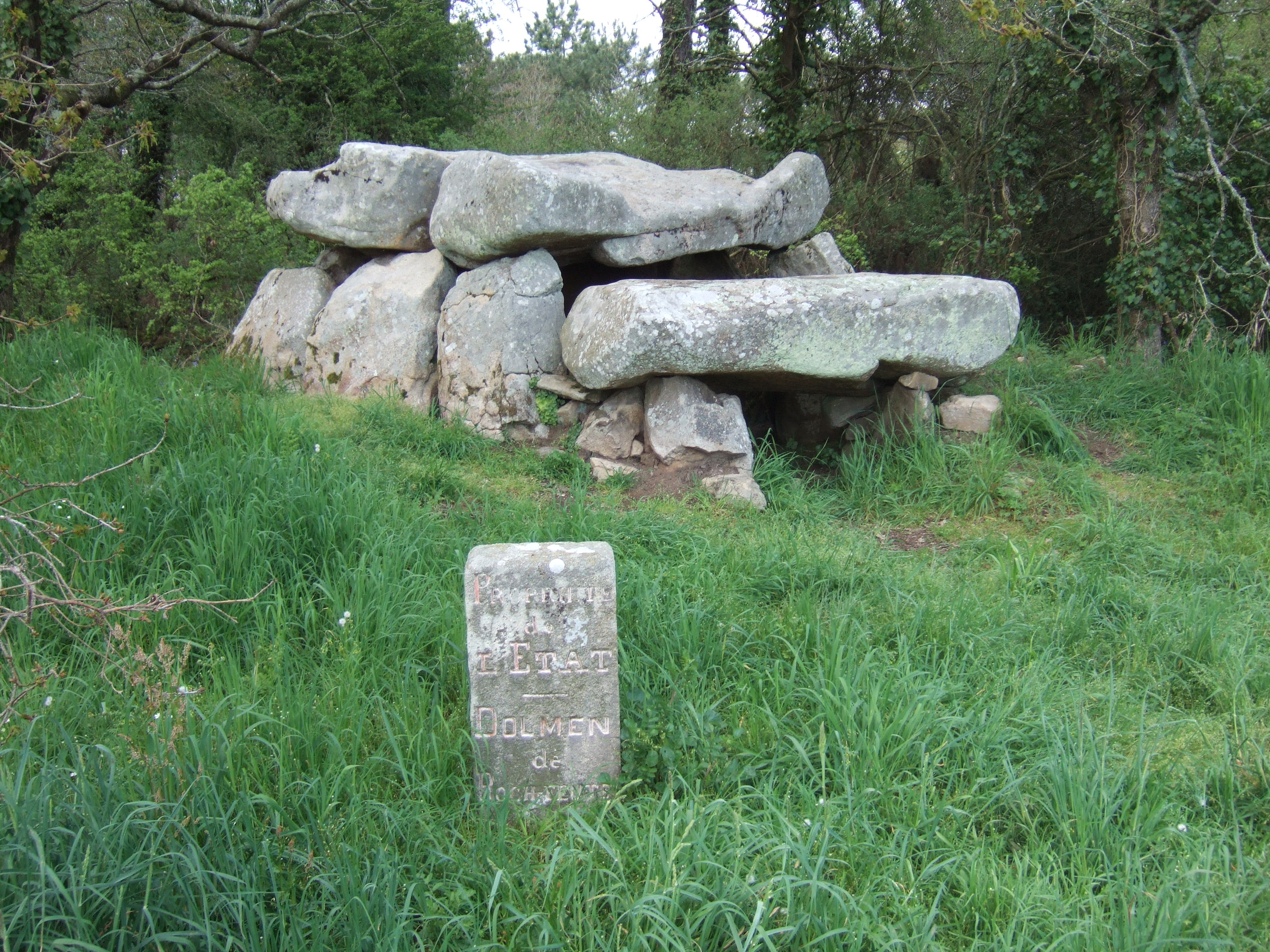
The dolmen Er-Roc'h-Feutet. An inscription next to every standing stone formation proclaims ownership by the state of France.

There are several dolmens scattered around the area. These dolmens are generally considered to have been tombs; however, the acidic soil of Brittany has eroded away the bones. They were constructed with several large stones supporting a capstone, then buried under a mound of earth. In many cases, the mound is no longer present, sometimes due to archeological excavation, and only the large stones remain, in various states of ruin.

=== Er-Roc'h-Feutet ===
Located toward the North, near the Chapelle de La Madeleine, Er-Roc'h-Feutet has a completely covered roof.

=== La Madeleine ===
Located at 47.6208°N 3.0482°W, La Madeleine is a large dolmen measuring 12 by 5 m (39 by 16 ft), with a 5 m (16 ft) long broken capstone. It is named after the nearby Chapelle de La Madeleine, which is still used.

=== Kercado ===
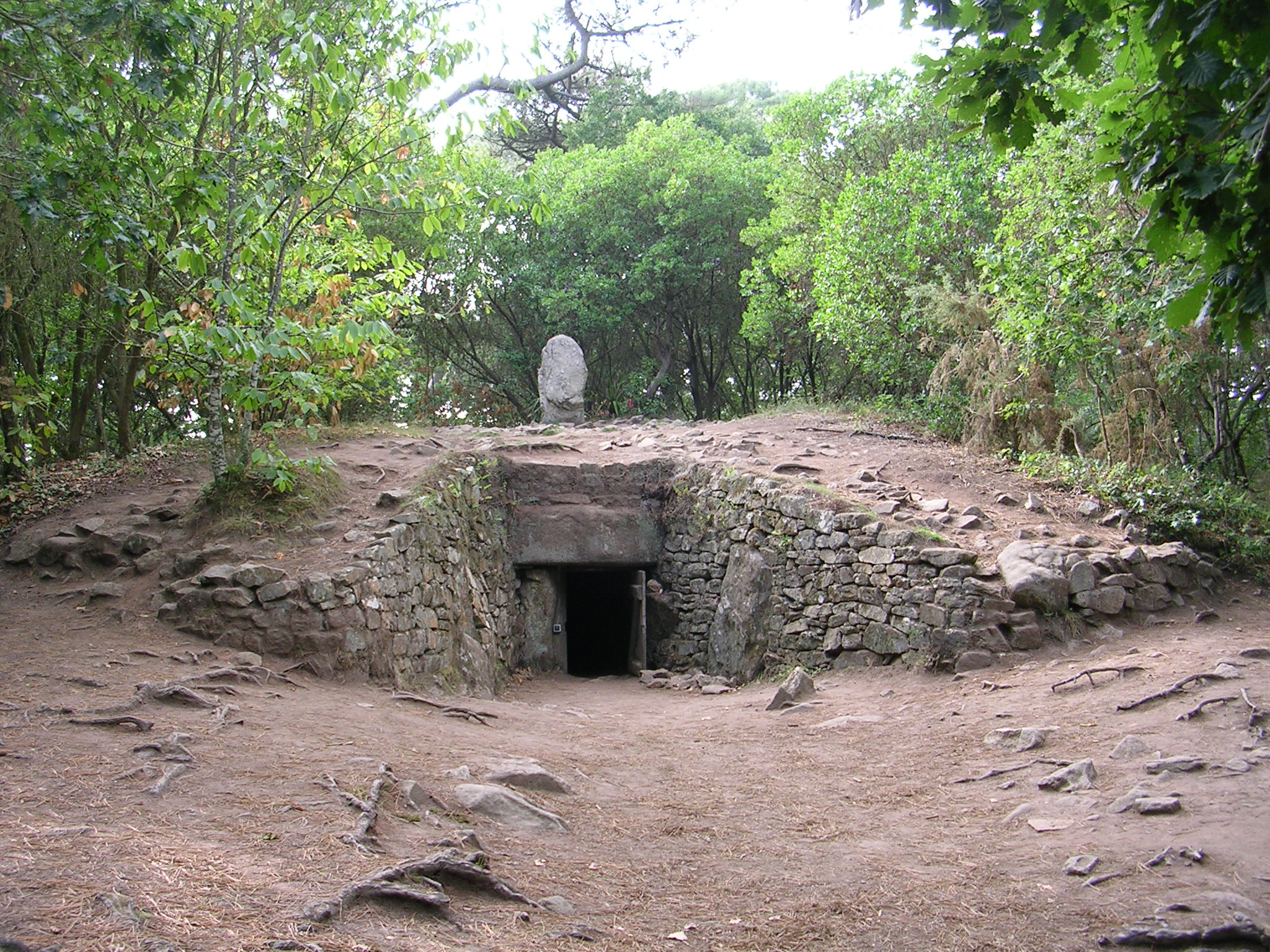
The Dolmen of Kercado, constructed c. 4600 BCE — smaller and older than St. Michel

A rare dolmen still covered by its original cairn. South of the Kermario alignments, it is 25 to 30 metres (82–98 ft) wide, 5 m (16 ft) high, and has a small menhir on top. Previously surrounded by a circle of small menhirs 4 m (13 ft) out, the main passage is 6.5 m (21 ft) long and leads to a large chamber where numerous artifacts were found, including axes, arrowheads, some animal and human teeth, some beads and sherds (fragments of pottery), and 26 beads of a unique bluish Nephrite gem. It has some Megalithic art carved on its inner surfaces in the form of serpentines and a human-sized double-axe symbol carved in the underside of its main roof slab. In ancient cultures, the axe and more precisely the bi-pennis used to represent the lightning powers of divinity. It was constructed around 4600 BC and used for approximately 3,000 years.

=== Kerlescan ===
A roughly rectangular mound, with only one capstone remaining. It is aligned east-to-west, with a passage entrance to the south.

=== Kermarquer ===
On a small hill, has two separate chambers.

=== Mané-Kerioned ===
(Pixies' mound or Grotte de Grionnec):A group of three dolmens with layout unique in Brittany, once covered by a tumulus. Whereas most groups of dolmens are parallel, these are arranged in a horseshoe. The largest of the three is at the east, 11 metres (36 ft).

=== Crucuno ===
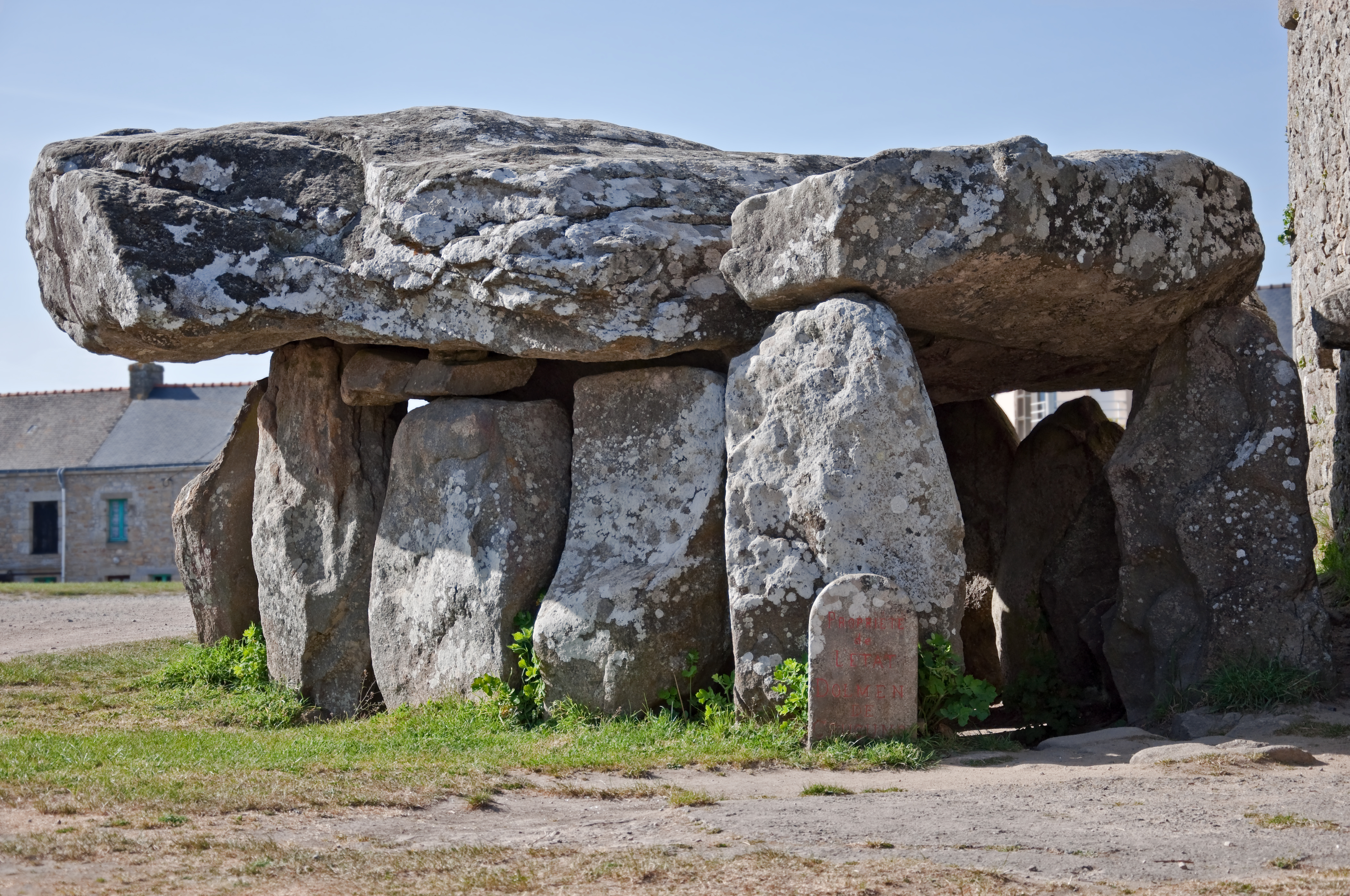
The Crucuno dolmen

A "classic" dolmen, with a 40-tonne (44-short-ton), 7.6-metre (24 ft 11 in) tablestone resting on pillars roughly 1.8 m (5 ft 11 in) high. Prior to 1900, it was connected by a passage making it 24 m (79 ft) long.

=== Crucuno stone rectangle ===
Located at 47.625°N 3.122°W, the Crucuno stone rectangle is a classic 3, 4, 5 rectangle of 21 menhirs varying in height from 0.91 metres (3.0 ft) to 2.4 metres (7.9 ft) that is aligned along its diagonal to the midsummer sunrise. Alexander Thom suggested it measured forty by thirty of his megalithic yards.

== Other formations ==
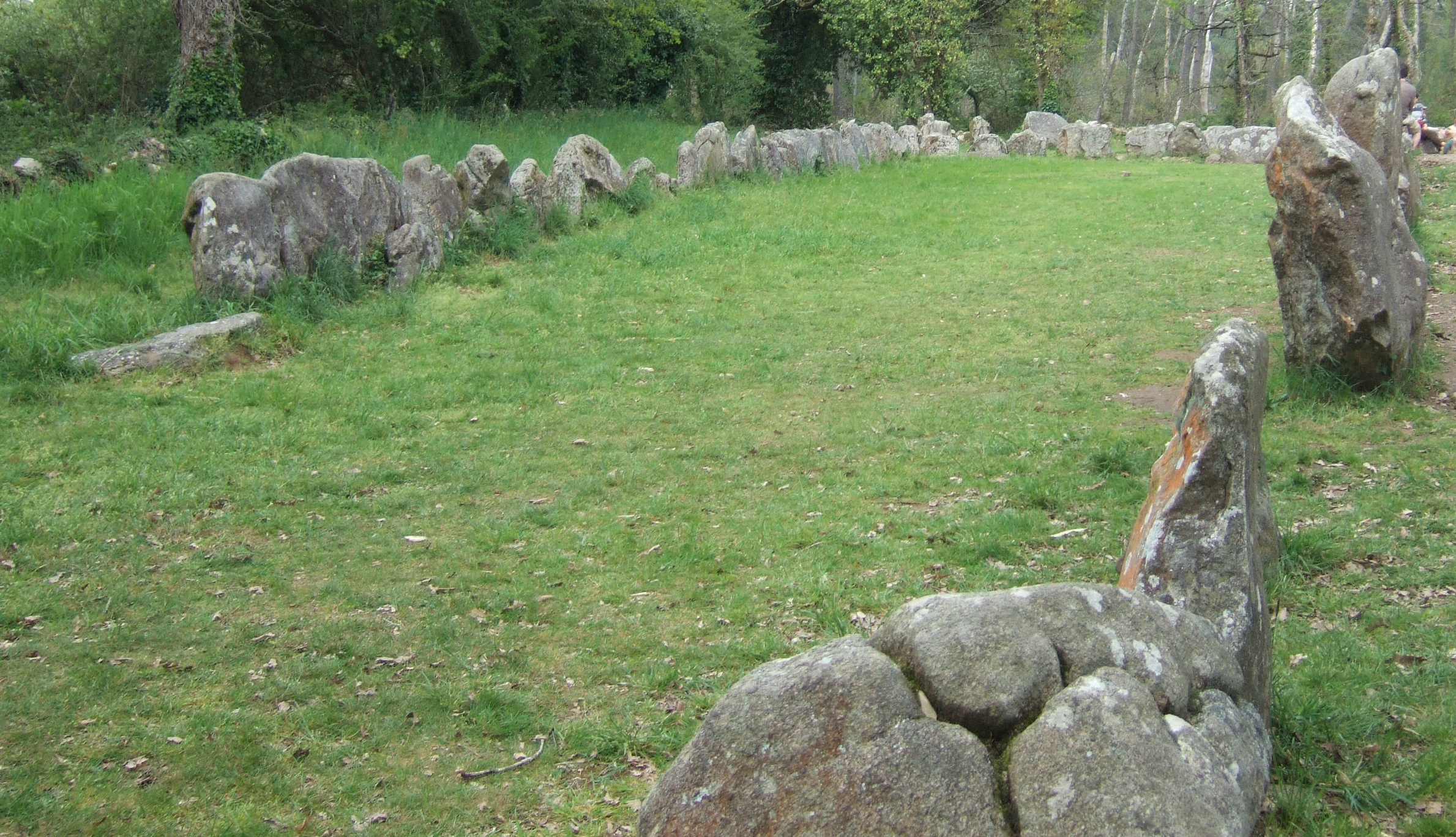
The Manio quadrilateral arrangement

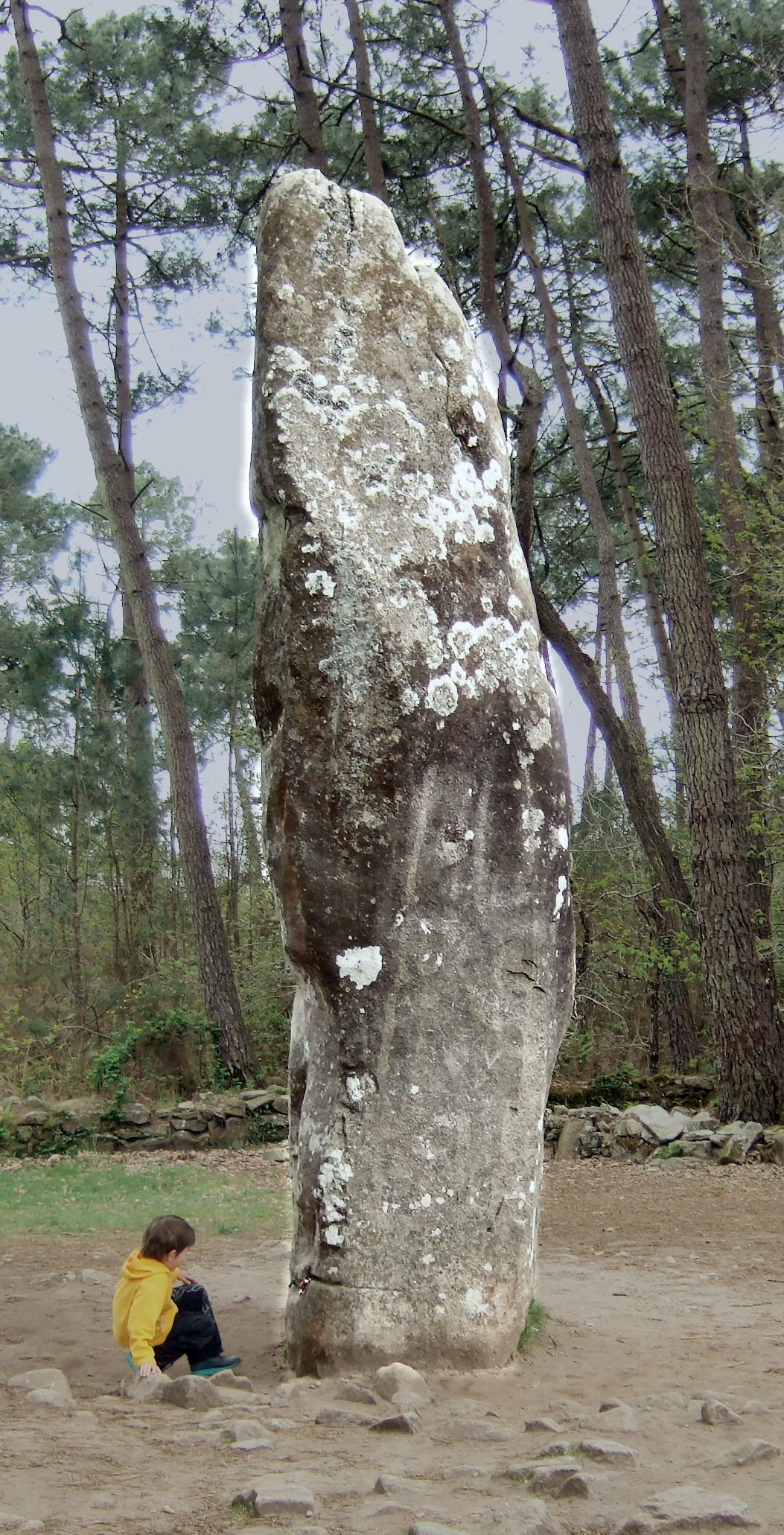
The Manio "Giant"

There are some individual menhirs and at least one other formation which do not fit into the above categories.

=== Manio quadrilateral ===
An arrangement of stones to form the perimeter of a large rectangle. Originally a "tertre tumulus" with a central mound, it is 37 m (121 ft) long, and aligned to east of northeast. The quadrilateral is 10 m (33 ft) wide to the east, but only 7 m (23 ft) wide at the west.

=== Manio giant ===
Located at 47.603°N 3.056°W near the Manio quadrilateral is a single massive menhir, now known as the Giant. Over 6.5 m (21 ft) tall, it was re-erected around 1900 by Zacharie Le Rouzic, and overlooks the nearby Kerlescan alignment.

== Excavation and analysis ==
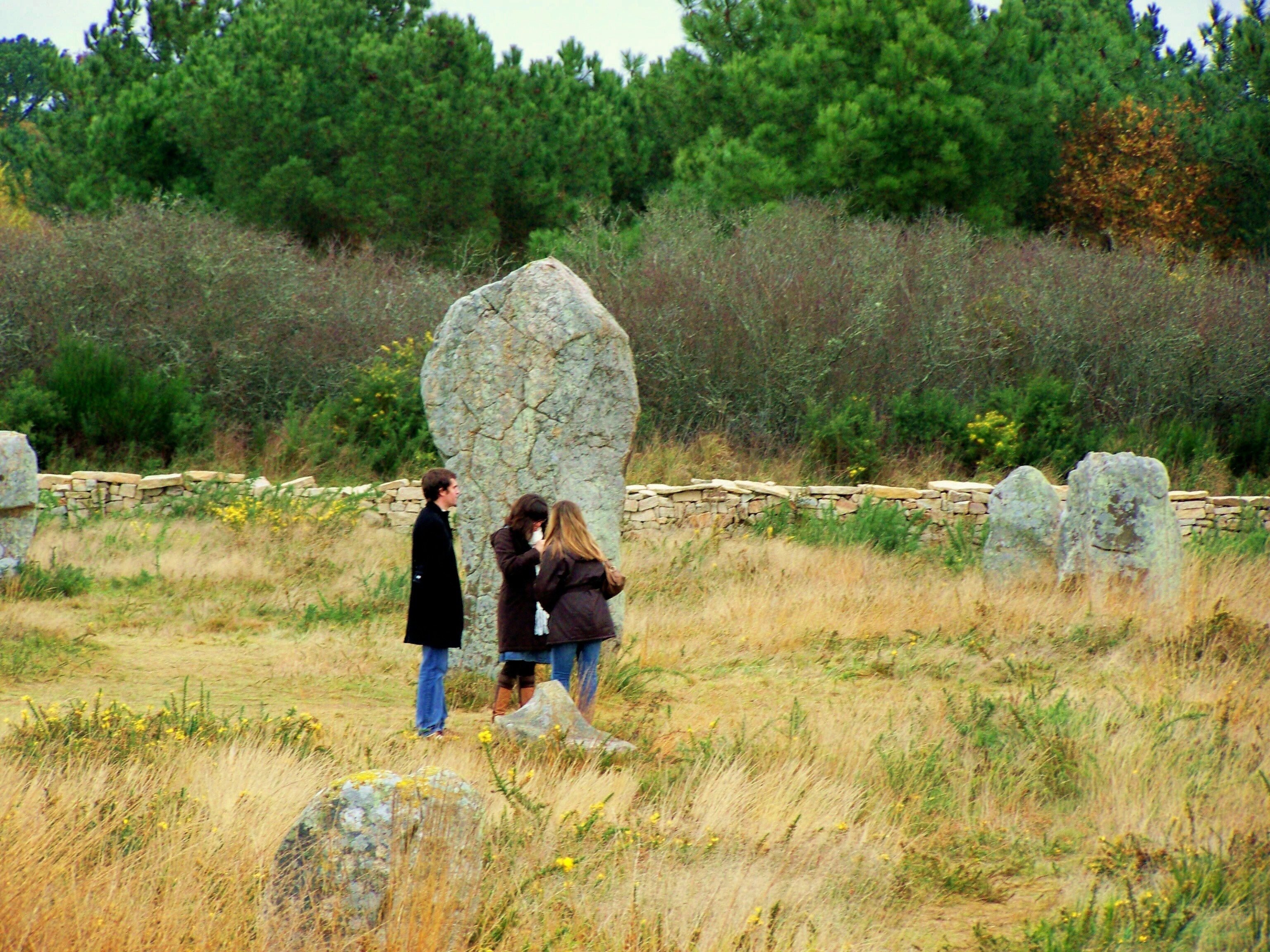
Large upright in the Ménec alignment

From the 1720s increasing interest was shown in these features. In 1796, for example, La Tour d'Auvergne attributed them to druidic gatherings. In 1805, A. Maudet de Penhoët claimed they represented stars in the sky.

Englishmen Francis Ronalds and Alexander Blair made a detailed survey of the stones in 1834. Ronalds created the first accurate drawings of many of them with his patented perspective tracing instrument, which were printed in a book Sketches at Carnac (Brittany) in 1834.

=== Miln and Le Rouzic ===
The first extensive excavation was performed in the 1860s by Scottish antiquary James Miln (1819–1881), who reported that by then fewer than 700 of the 3,000 stones were still standing. Towards 1875, Miln engaged a local boy, Zacharie Le Rouzic (1864–1939), as his assistant, and Zacharie learnt archaeology on the job. After Miln's death, he left the results of his excavations to the town of Carnac, and the James Miln Museum was established there by his brother Robert to house the artifacts. Zacharie became the director of the Museum and, although self-taught, became an internationally recognised expert on megaliths in the region. He too left the results of his work to the town, and the museum is now named Le Musée de Préhistoire James Miln – Zacharie le Rouzic.

=== Other theories ===
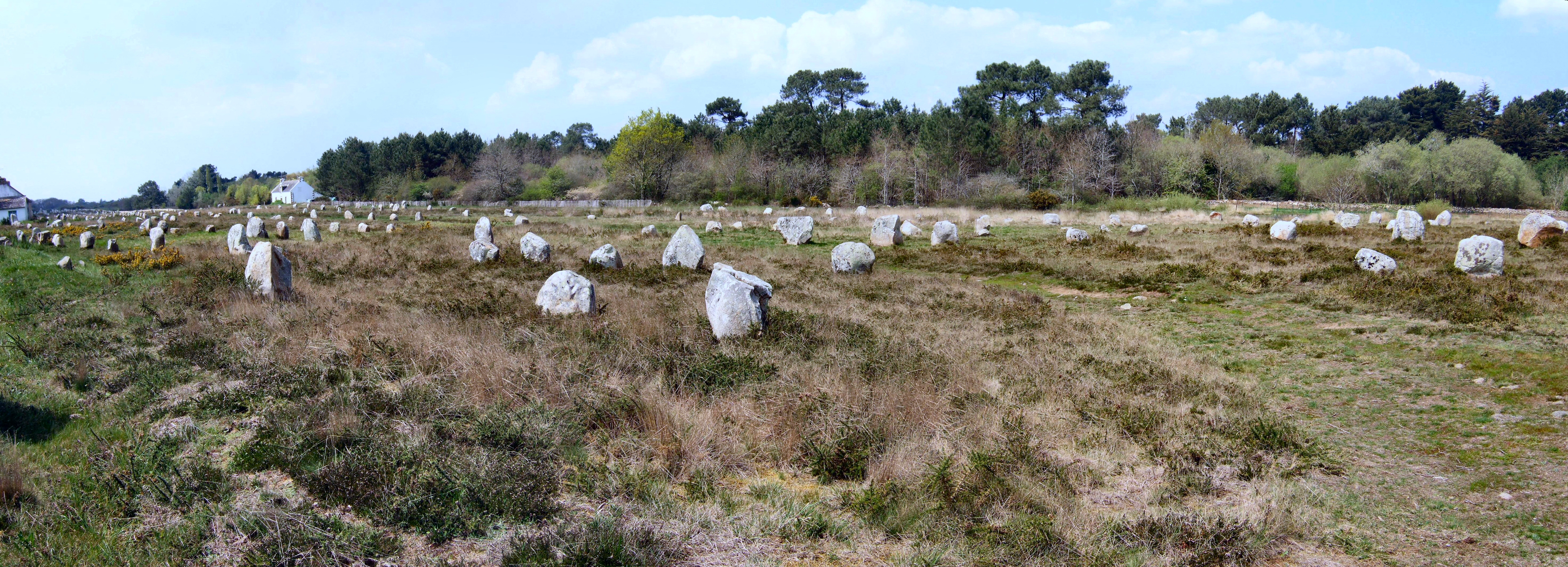
The Ménec alignments of some 1,100 stones in 11 columns

In 1887, H. de Cleuziou argued for a connection between the rows of stones and the directions of sunsets at the solstices.

Among more recent studies, Alexander Thom worked with his son Archie from 1970 to 1974 to carry out a detailed survey of the Carnac alignments, and produced a series of papers on the astronomical alignments of the stones as well as statistical analysis supporting his concept of the megalithic yard. Thom's megalithic yard has been challenged.

There are also general theories on the use of the stones as astronomical observatories, as has been claimed for Stonehenge. According to one such theory, the massive menhir at nearby Locmariaquer was linked to the alignments for such a purpose.

== Management ==
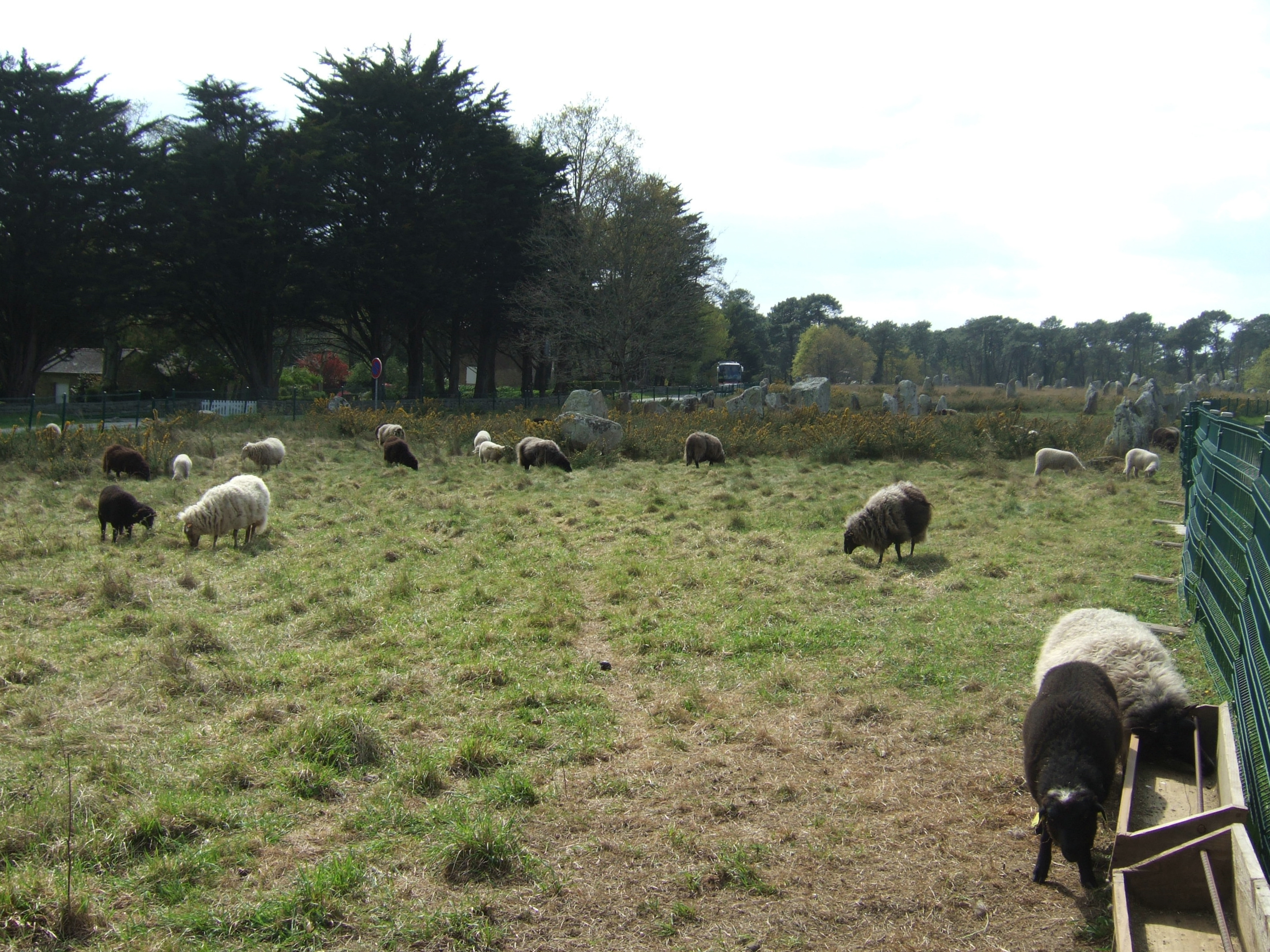
Sheep grazing around the Kerlescan alignment, part of a new management strategy

The Musée de Préhistoire James Miln – Zacharie le Rouzic is at the centre of conserving and displaying the artefacts from the area. It also contains the "world's largest collection [of] prehistoric[al] exhibits" with over 6,600 prehistoric objects from 136 different sites.

The monuments themselves were listed and purchased by the State at the start of the 20th century to protect them against quarrymen, and while this was successful at the time, in the middle of the century, redevelopment, changes to agricultural practices and increasing tourism bringing visitors to the stones led to rapid deterioration. The Ministère de la Culture et de la Communication (Heritage Ministry) re-examined the issue starting in 1984, and subsequently set up the 'Mission Carnac' in 1991 with the aim of rehabilitating and developing the alignments. This involved restricting public access, launching a series of scientific and technical studies, and producing a plan for conservation and development in the area.

As with the megalithic structure of Stonehenge in England, management of the stones can be controversial. Since 1991, the main groups of stone rows have been protected from the public by fences "to help vegetation growth", preventing visits except by organised tours. They are open during winter, however. When James Miln studied the stones in the 1860s, he reported that fewer than 700 of the 3,000 stones were still standing, and subsequent work during the 1930s and 1980s (using bulldozers) rearranged the stones, re-erecting some, to make way for roads or other structures. In 2002, protesters invaded the site, opening the padlocks and allowing tourists free entry. In particular, the group Collectif Holl a gevred (French and Breton for "the everyone-together collective") occupied the visitor centre for the Kermario alignment, demanding an immediate stop to current management plans and local input into further plans.

In recent years, management of the site has also experimented with allowing sheep to graze among the stones, in order to keep gorse and other weeds under control.

In June 2023, 39 menhirs still outside the UNESCO protected site were destroyed to construct a DIY store of the Mr. Bricolage franchise, which obtained a building permit from the local town hall in August 2022. The affected stones were located in the town of Montaubin, separate from the primary tourist locations of Ménec and Kermario, which are situated a little over 1.5 km (1 mile) away. The town's mayor, Olivier Lepick, told AFP that he had "followed the law" and pointed to the "low archaeological value" of objects found during checks before the construction process began. He also admitted to being unaware that the site was listed on the Heritage Atlas, despite reportedly presiding over the group that applied for UNESCO status for the prehistoric sites. While Lepick blamed the region's complex zoning situation, the researcher Christian Obeltz claimed that "elected officials in the area and the department are in a hurry to build up anything because once it is classified with UNESCO, it won't be possible anymore". The local Koun Breizh association lodged a complaint with the public prosecutor of Vannes for willful destruction of sites that relate to archaeological heritage.

In 2025, the stones, along with 550 monuments across 28 towns and villages in Morbihan, were designated as World Heritage Sites by UNESCO.

== See also ==
- Prehistory of Brittany
- Passage grave
- Megalith
- List of megalithic sites
- Michelsberg culture
