= Callaïs =

Precious stones used in ancient beadmaking

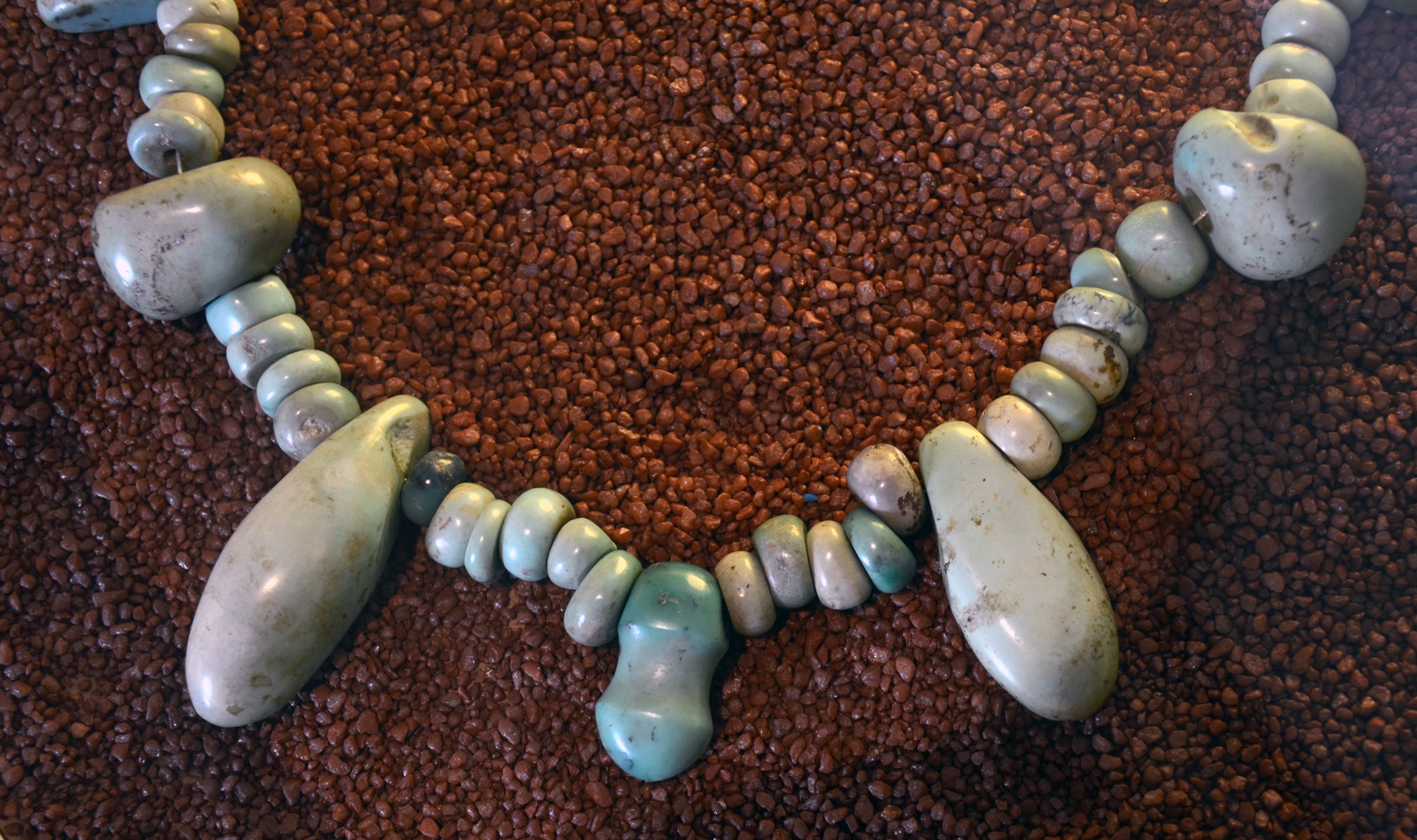
An example of a variscite "callaïs" necklace of Neolithic origin, dated 4500 - 4000 BC, found in Arzon. The necklace now located in the Musée d'Histoire et d'Archéologie de Vannes.

Callaïs are ancient green-blue precious stones used for making pendants and beads by western European cultures of the later Neolithic and early Bronze Age. "Callaïs" is a generic term that includes turquoise and variscite, but not jade. It was described by Pliny the Elder as being paler than lapis lazuli. Callaïs objects have been found in Neolithic tombs from the mid-5th millennium BC in the Carnac region of western France.

Callaïs deposits are thought to have been widely distributed throughout the Iberian peninsula, and transported from Andalusia, Castile, and Catalonia to Brittany, Normandy, and the Paris Basin.
