= Variscite =

Hydrated aluminium phosphate

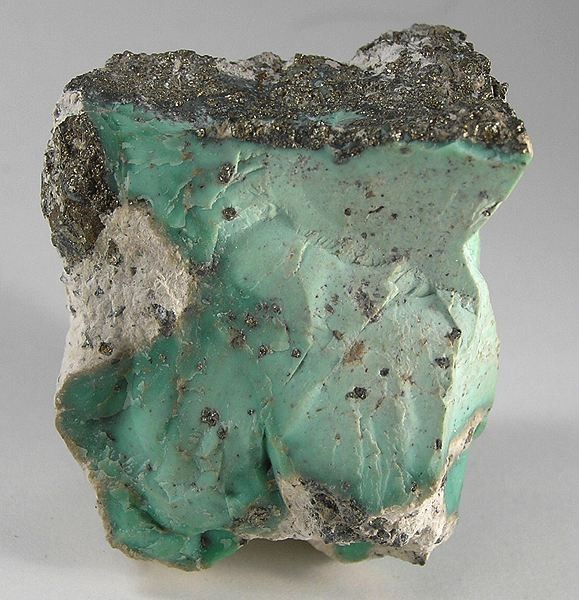

General
- Category: Phosphate minerals
- Formula: AlPO_{4}·2H_{2}O
- IMA symbol: Var
- Strunz classification: 8.CD.10
- Crystal system: Orthorhombic
- Crystal class: Dipyramidal (mmm); H-M symbol: (2/m 2/m 2/m)
- Space group: Pbca

Identification
- Color: Pale to emerald-green (pale green in transmitted light), green, blue green, yellow green, pale shades of brown or yellow, rarely red and colourless to white
- Crystal habit: Encrustations and reniform masses
- Cleavage: [010] perfect
- Fracture: Conchoidal to splintery
- Mohs scale hardness: 4.5
- Luster: Vitreous to waxy
- Streak: White
- Diaphaneity: Transparent to translucent
- Specific gravity: 2.57 to 2.61
- Optical properties: Biaxial (−)
- Refractive index: nα = 1.563 nβ = 1.588 nγ = 1.594
- Birefringence: δ = 0.031

Variscite is a relatively rare hydrated aluminium phosphate mineral (AlPO_{4}·2H_{2}O). It is sometimes confused with turquoise; however, variscite is usually greener in color. The green color results from the presence of small amounts of trivalent chromium (Cr^{3+}).

== Geology ==
Variscite is a secondary mineral formed by direct deposition from phosphate-bearing water which has reacted with aluminium-rich rocks in a near-surface environment. It occurs as fine-grained masses in nodules, cavity fillings, and crusts. Variscite often contains white veins of the calcium aluminium phosphate mineral crandallite.

It was first described in 1837 and named for the locality of Variscia, the historical name of the Vogtland, in Germany. At one time, variscite was called Utahlite. At times, materials which may be turquoise or may be variscite have been marketed as "variquoise". Appreciation of the color ranges typically found in variscite have made it a popular gem in recent years.

Variscite from Nevada typically contains black spiderwebbing in the matrix and is often confused with green turquoise. Most of the Nevada variscite recovered in recent decades has come from mines located in Lander County and Esmeralda County, specifically in the Candelaria Hills.

Notable localities are Lucin, Snowville, and Fairfield in Utah, United States. Most recently found in Wyoming as well. It is also found in Germany, Australia, Poland, Spain, Italy (Sardinia), Brazil, and Iran (Yazd).

== Jewelry ==
Variscite has been used in Europe to make personal ornaments, especially beads, since Neolithic times. In the tumulus (burial mounds) excavated in the 19th century in Brittany (France)—among them the tomb of Mané er Hroëck in Locmariaquer and the Tumiac mound in Arzon—dating from the Neolithic period, between 4500 and 4000 BCE, many ornamental pieces, beads, and pendants were found. These were made from a green stone that Alexis Damour identified as a hydrated aluminum phosphate containing some iron, which he considered equivalent to the callaïs described by Pliny in his Natural History. Later, variscite was found in Neolithic archaeological sites in Spain as well. During Roman times, variscite was used to imitate emerald crystals employed as pendants, being carved into prisms drilled longitudinally through the center but having eight faces instead of the six typical of emerald crystals. It was not until the 19th century that it was determined that all variscite used in Europe came from three sites in Spain, Gavá (Barcelona), Palazuelo de las Cuevas (Zamora), and Encinasola (Huelva).

Variscite is sometimes used as a semi-precious stone, and is popular for carvings and ornamental use due to its beautiful and intense green color, and is commonly used in silversmithing in place of turquoise. Variscite is less common than turquoise. However, because it is not as commonly available or as well known to the general public, raw variscite tends to be less expensive than turquoise.

== Gallery ==
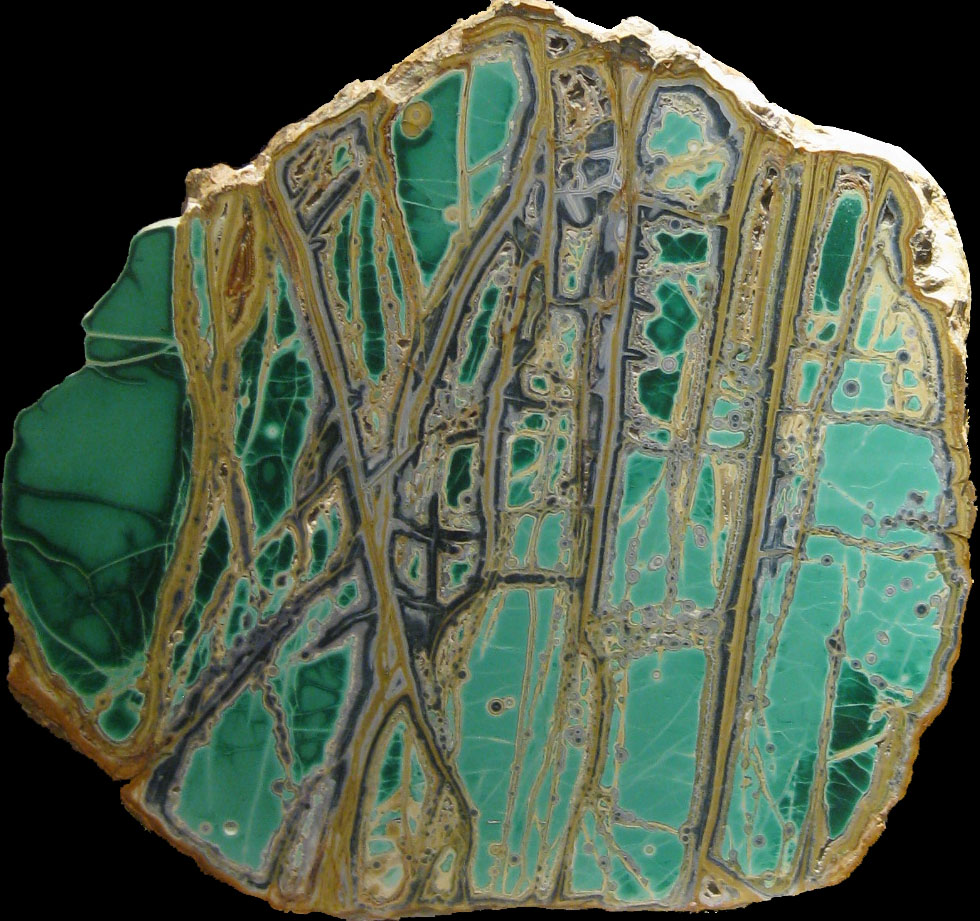
Cut slab of variscite at the Smithsonian. Specimen is roughly 0.5 m wide.

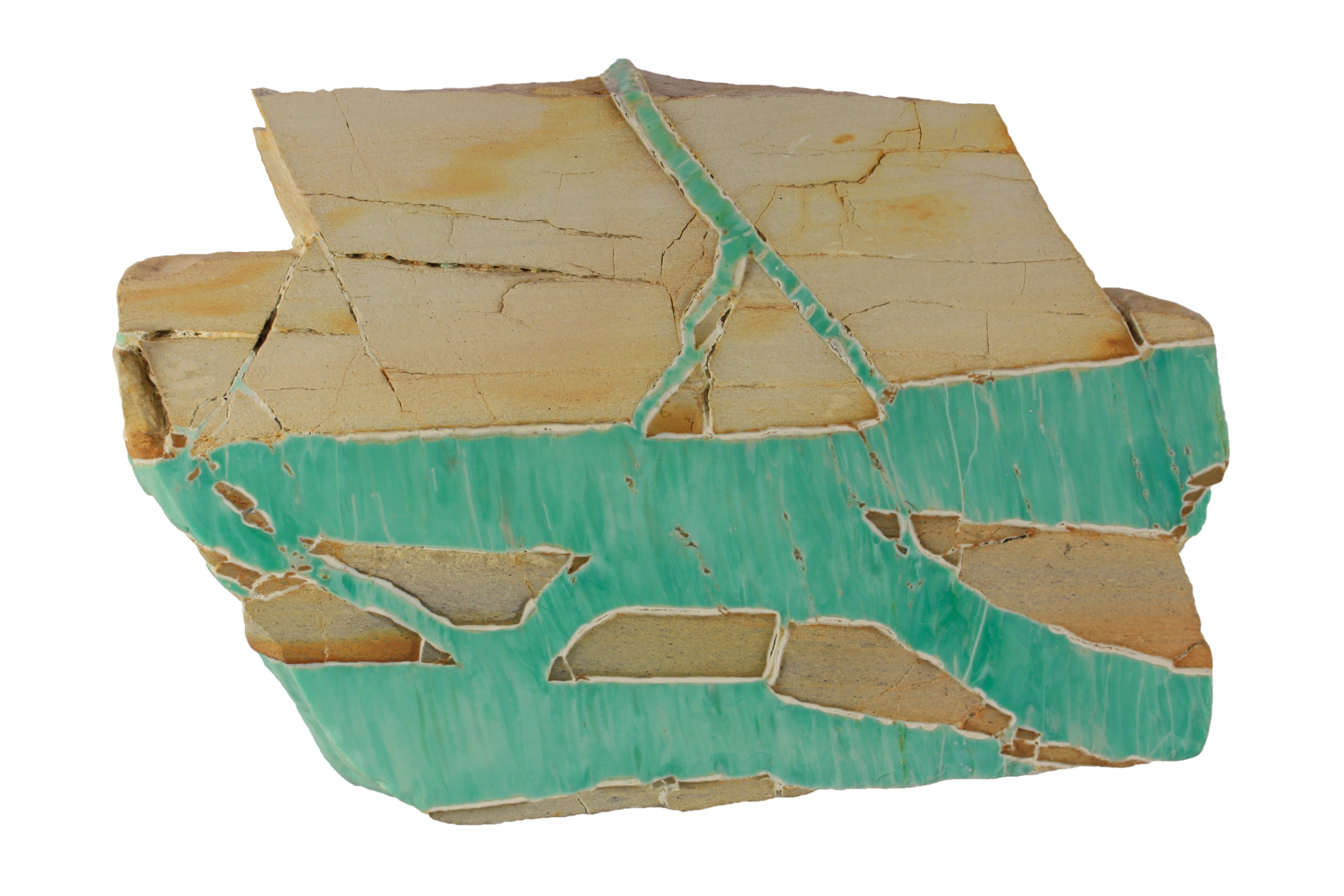
Variscite filling the cracks in siltstone. The sample is from Queensland, Australia. The width of the view is 11 cm (4.3 in).

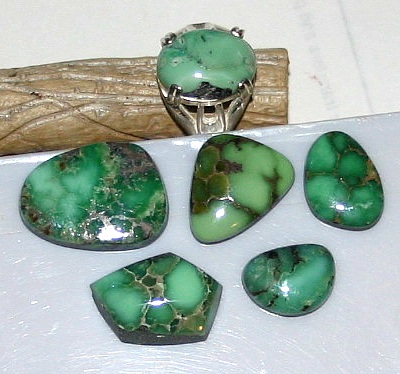
Polished variscite from Nevada

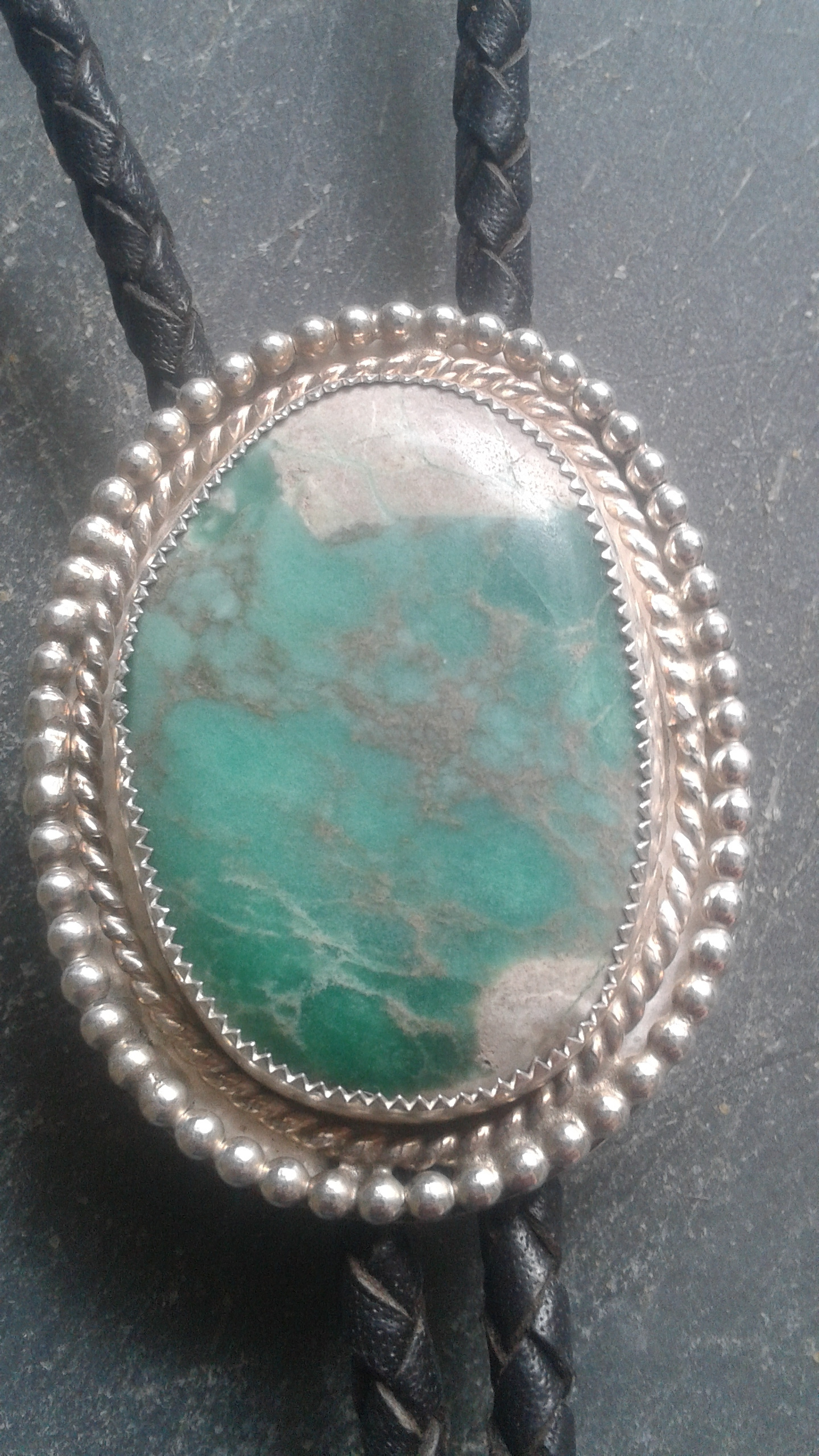
Variscite and silver bolo tie. This variscite specimen contains inclusions of white crandallite and is from Clay Canyon near Fairfield, Utah.

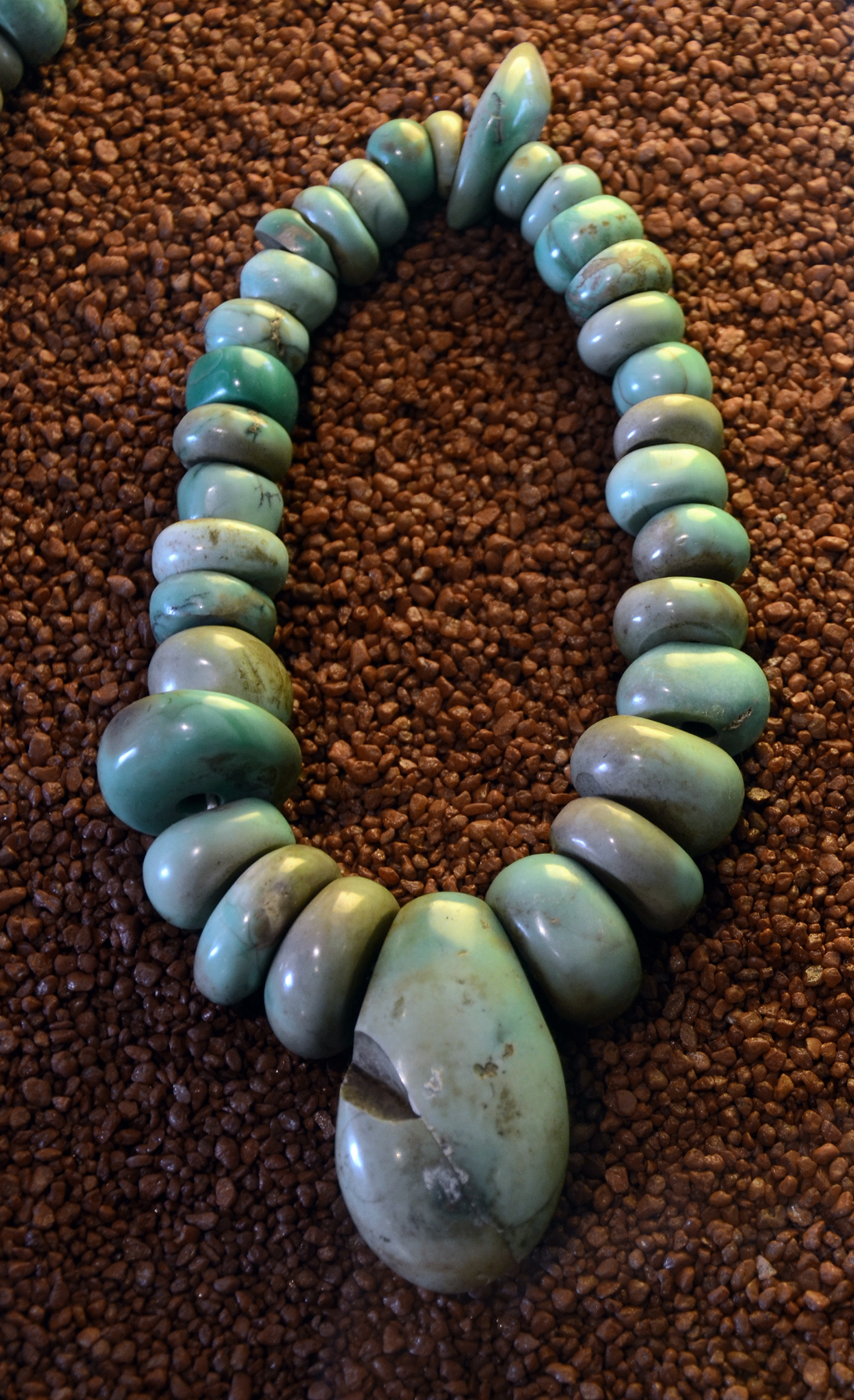
Necklace of variscite, from Neolithic tumulus of Turmiac c 4500-4000 BCE

== See also ==
- Variscan orogeny – Collision of tectonic plates resulting in the creation of mountains (same etymology, as named from the ancient locality of Variscia in Germany)
- List of minerals
