= Musée de Préhistoire de Carnac =

Museum in Carnac, France

Carnac Museum of Prehistory
- Musée de Préhistoire de Carnac
- Established: 1881, reopened in current location in 1985
- Location: Place Christian Bonnet, 56340 Carnac, Morbihan, France
- Coordinates: 47°35′05″N 3°04′42″W
- Type: Archaeology
- Collections: Objects, particularly from the Neolithic period, recovered from archaeological sites (ceramics, flint tools, polished axes, ornaments, etc.)
- Collection size: 350,000 objects
- Visitors: 36,688 (2019)
- Website: https://www.museedecarnac.com/?lang=en

The Musée de Préhistoire de Carnac (English: Carnac Museum of Prehistory; also known as the James Miln–Zacharie Le Rouzic Archaeological Museum) is a single-theme museum located in the town of Carnac, in the French department of Morbihan.

== History ==
=== The historic building ===
In 1881, upon the death of archaeologist James Miln, the archaeological artifacts he had gathered during his excavations in Carnac were still being kept and displayed in the rooms he had occupied at the Hôtel des Voyageurs in Carnac. Robert Miln, James's brother, tasked Admiral Tremlett—another resident of the hotel—with settling the estate locally. In 1882, Tremlett proposed donating the collections to the town of Carnac, thereby helping to found the J. Miln Museum. Robert Miln funded the construction of a dedicated building to house his brother's collections and appointed Zacharie Le Rouzic as the museum's guardian.

In 1910, Le Rouzic became the official curator. He contributed to the museum's renown by conducting tours during the tourist season, a role he maintained until his death. In 1926, Le Rouzic bequeathed his own collection of 3,000 archaeological artifacts to the J. Miln Museum. The Carnac town council subsequently added his name to the museum's title. In 1946, the museum was placed under the administration of the University of Rennes (Institute of Geology) before finally being returned to the town of Carnac in 1958. In 1984, the museum moved into the former rectory.

=== A new museum project ===
In response to tourist numbers and the deteriorating preservation conditions at the historic museum, the construction of a new building was announced in 2024, with the aim of accommodating three times as many visitors, starting in 2027. The funding—approximately 20 million euros—was to be shared between the municipality and local and national grants.

This project became a central issue in the 2026 municipal election; the outgoing council had initiated the project, while the opposition sought to cancel it and instead launch a restoration of the existing museum. The latter group prevailed following a very close vote.

== Collections ==
The museum houses one of Europe's most significant prehistoric collections, comprising 350,000 objects from two hundred sites—including 120 megalithic ones—spread across thirty municipalities in southern Morbihan between the Étel estuary and the Rhuys Peninsula. The collection includes several key Neolithic and regional megalithic sites (such as Téviec, the Saint-Michel tumulus, the Er Lannic enclosure, and the Manio tumulus). These collections are designated as Monument historiques and hold the "Musée de France" title.

== Gallery ==
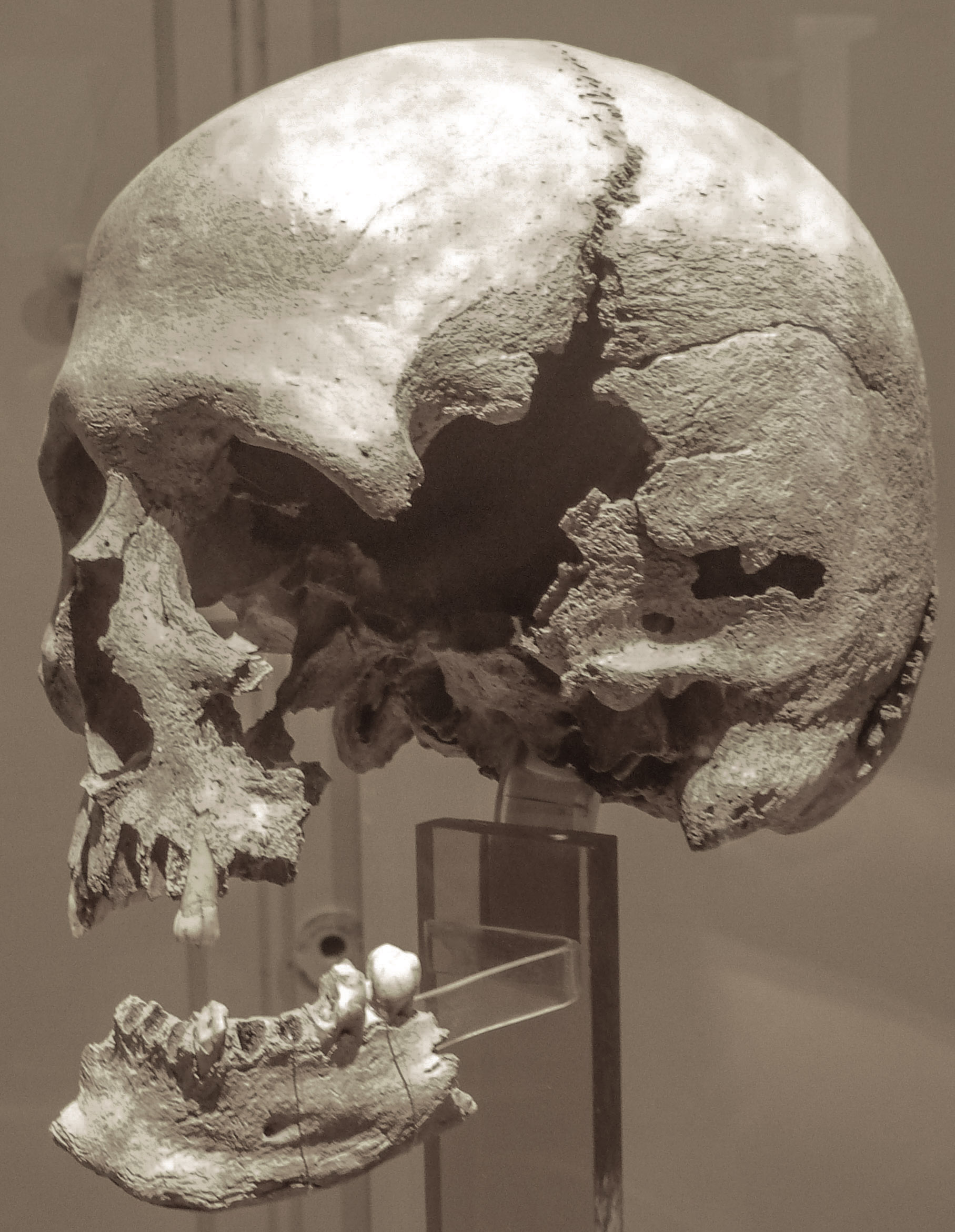
Man's skull found on the islet of Er Yoc'h (excavation by Zacharie Le Rouzic carried out in 1924–1925)

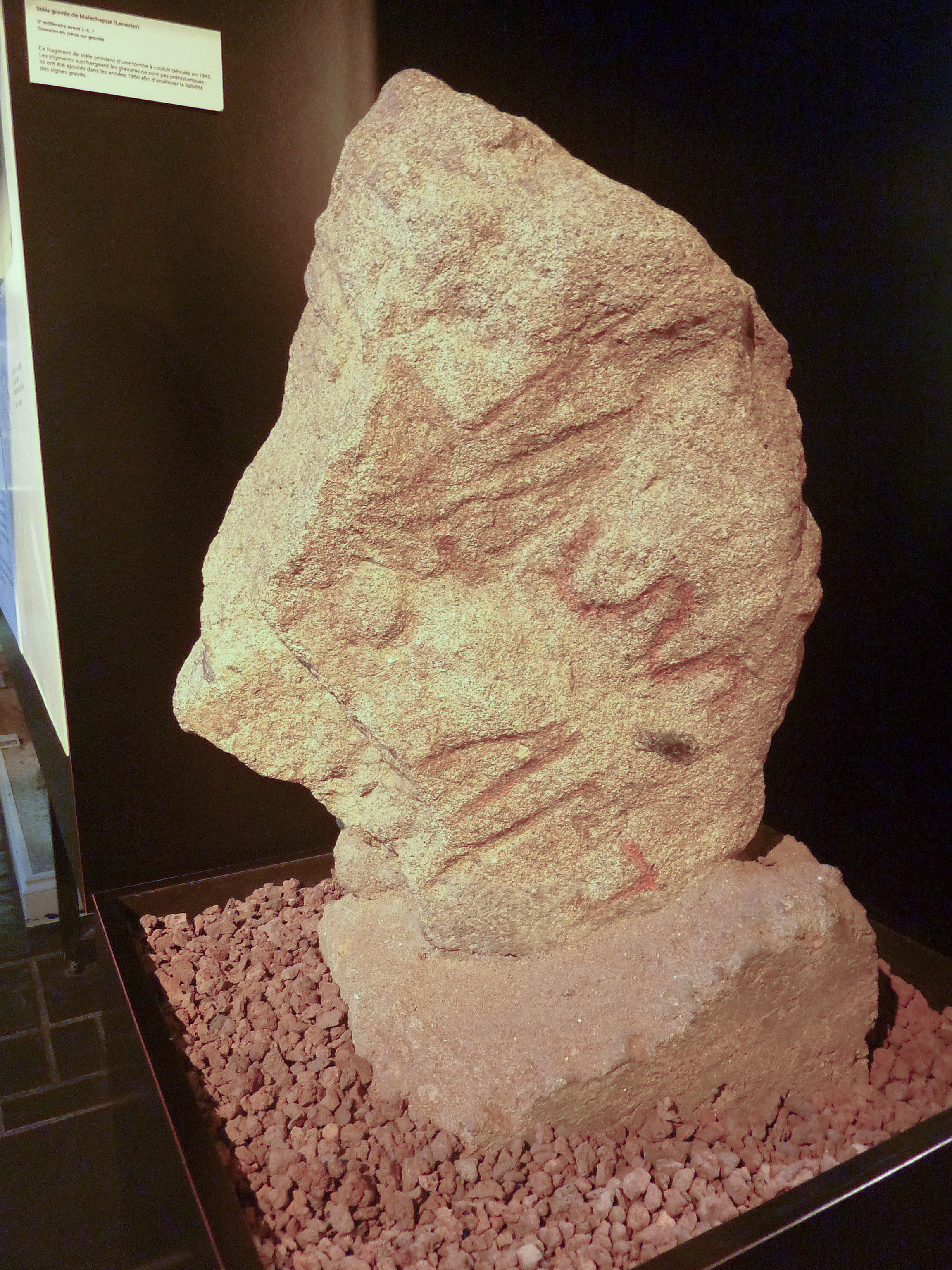
Engraved stele from Malachappe in Lanester (dating probably from the 5th millennium BC)

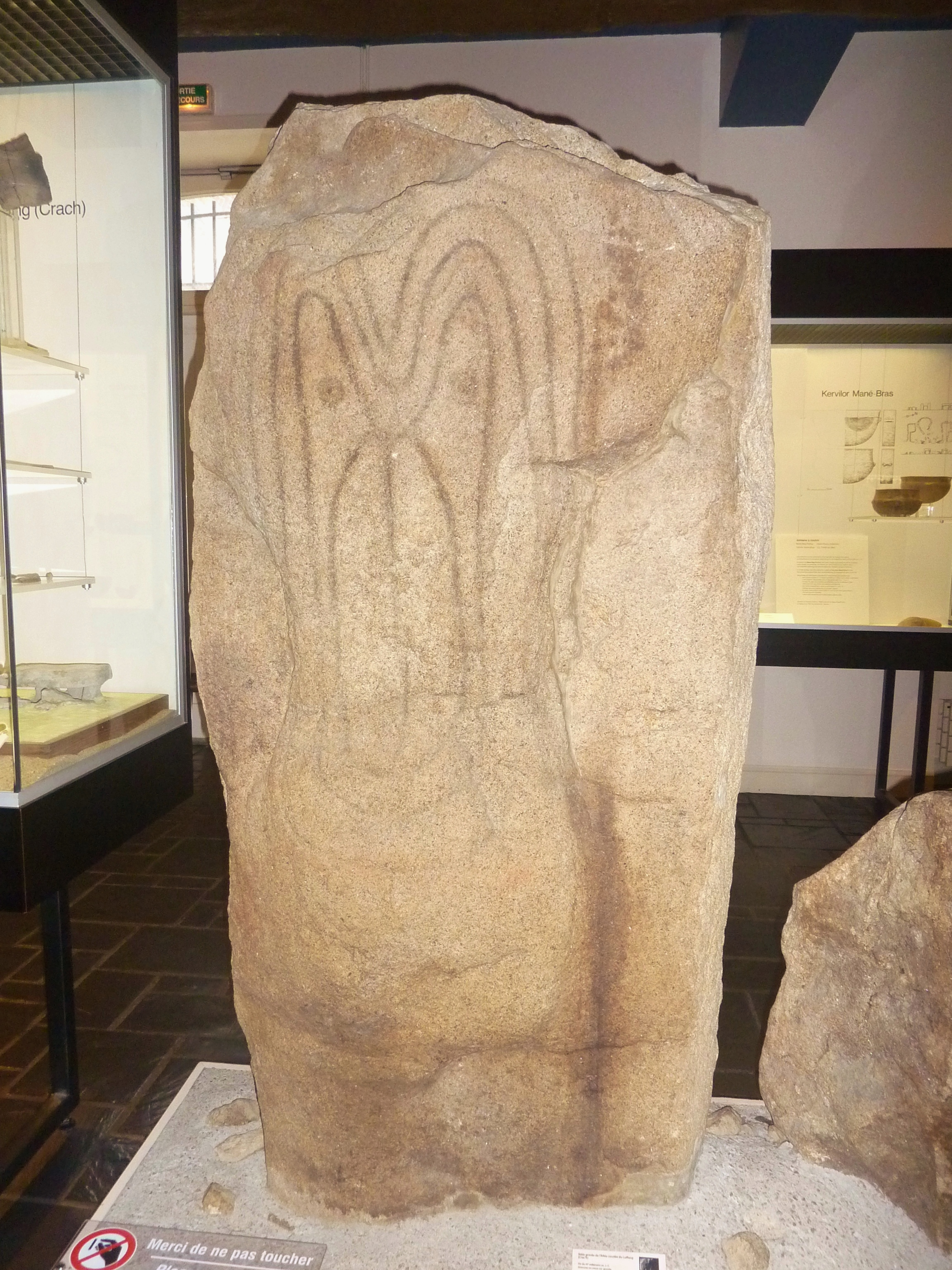
Engraved stele from the Luffang Tal-er-Roch angled gallery grave (incised carvings on granite; late 4th millennium BC)

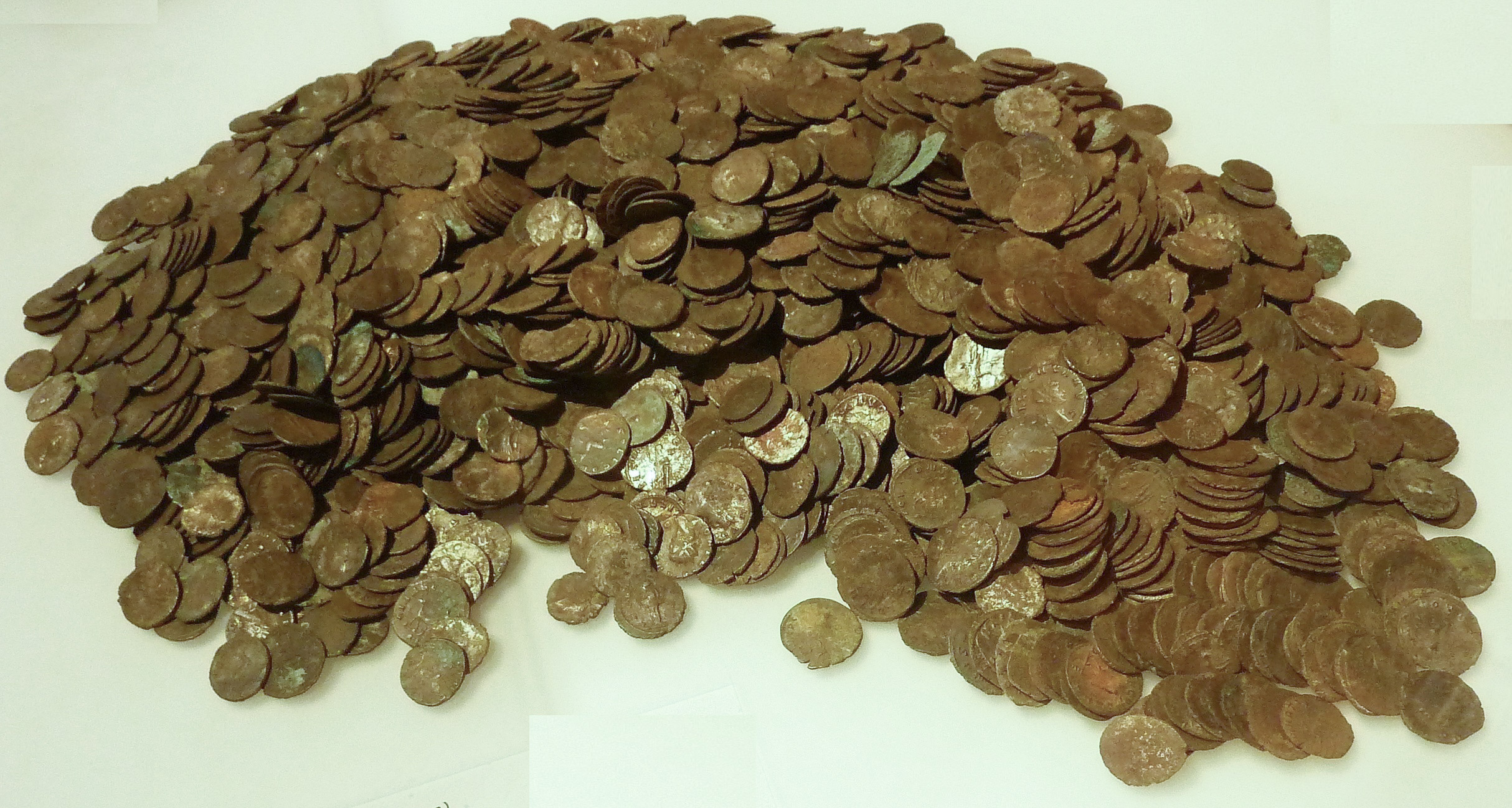
Missiriac: the Bermagouët treasure (coins buried at the end of the 3rd century AD)

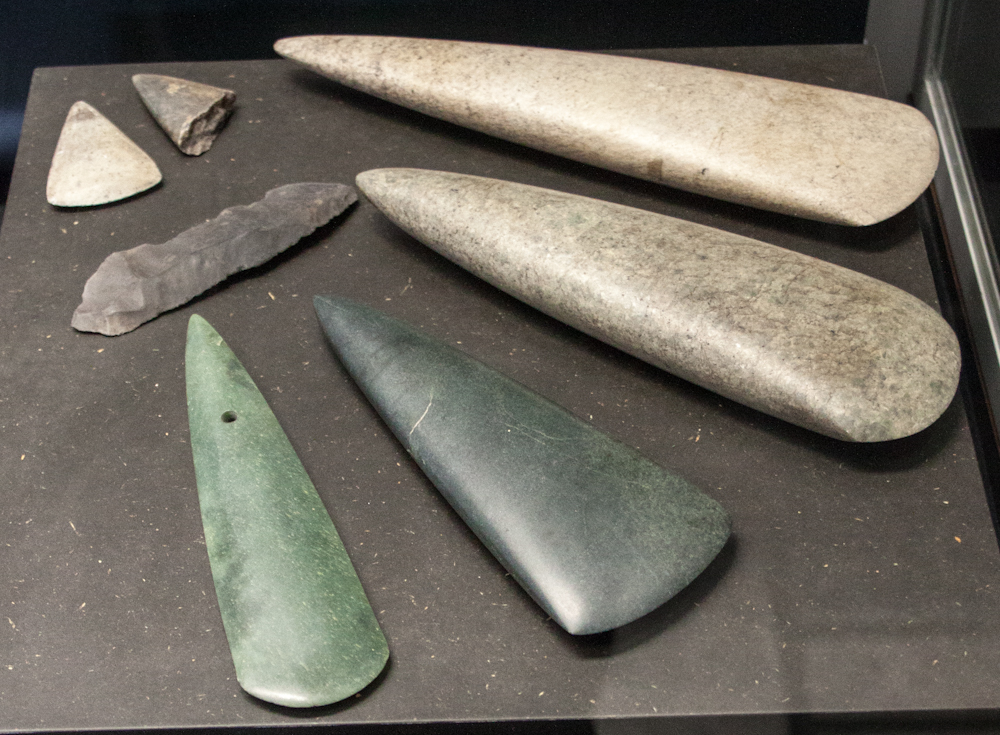
Polished axes found in 1861 in the Croix de Kerham burial mound in Ploemeur (c. 4500–4000 BC). This tumulus has since been destroyed.

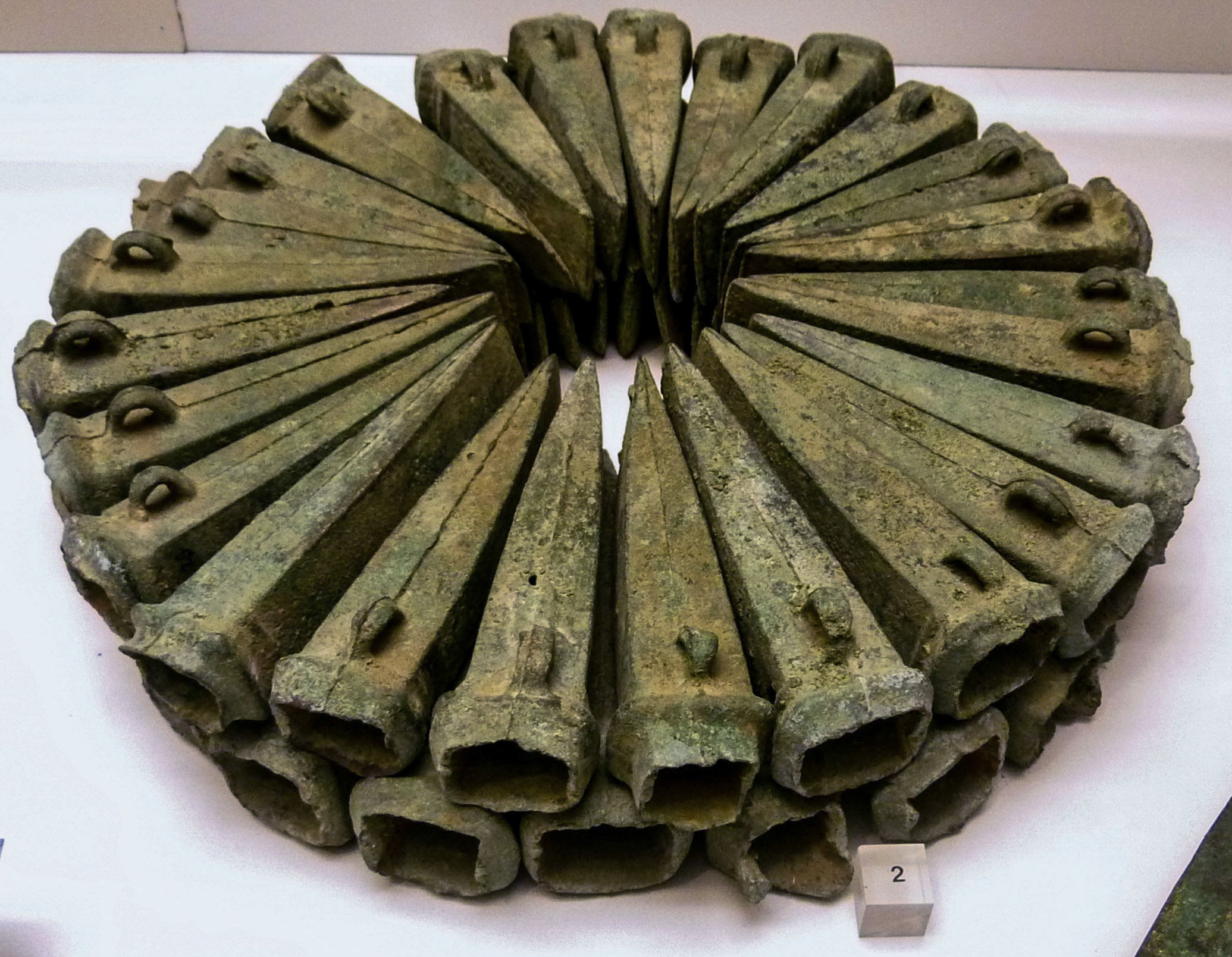
Socketed axes from the Quélenesse hoard in Cléguérec, found in 1970.

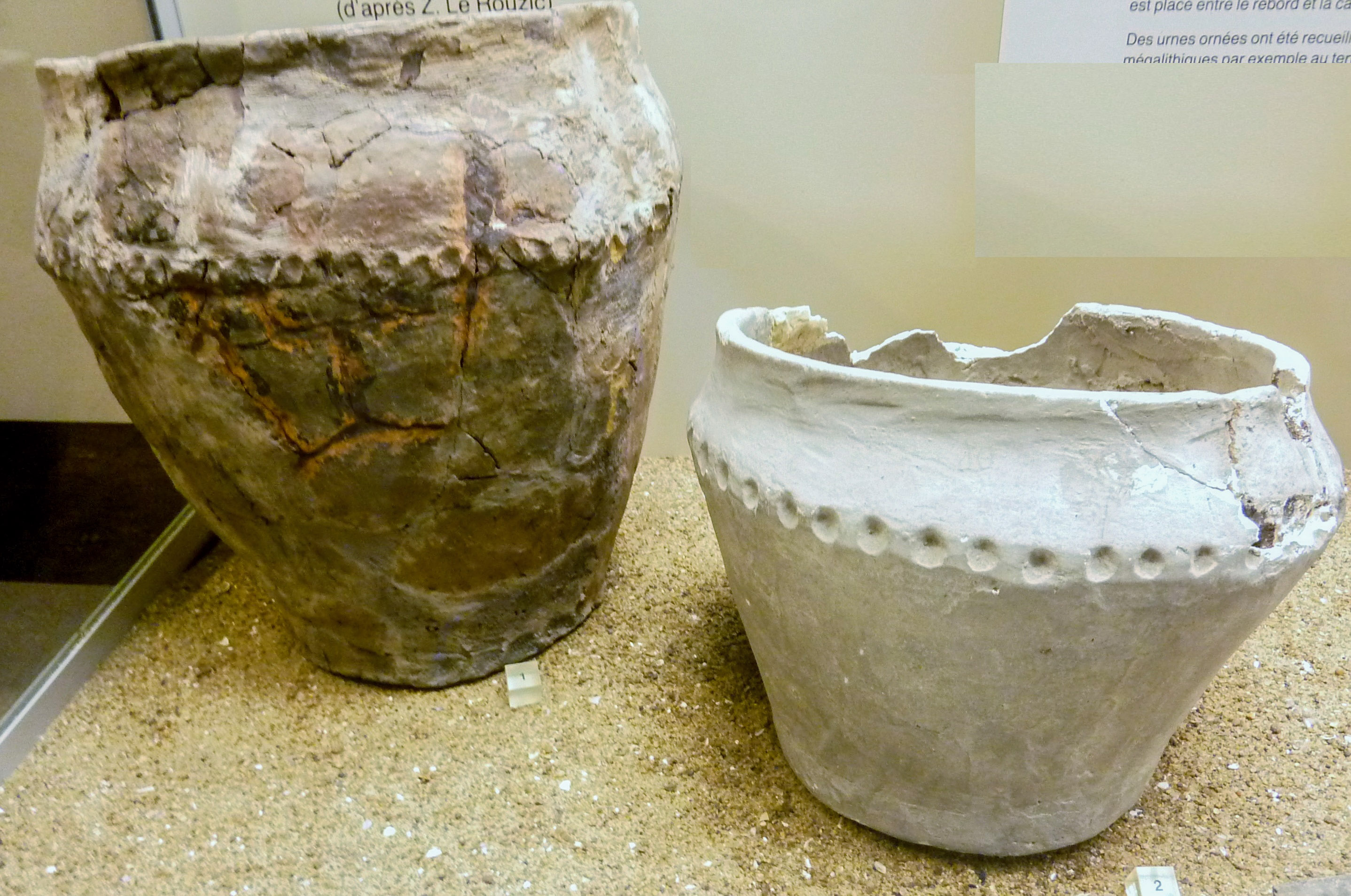
Two vases on display at the Carnac Museum of Prehistory

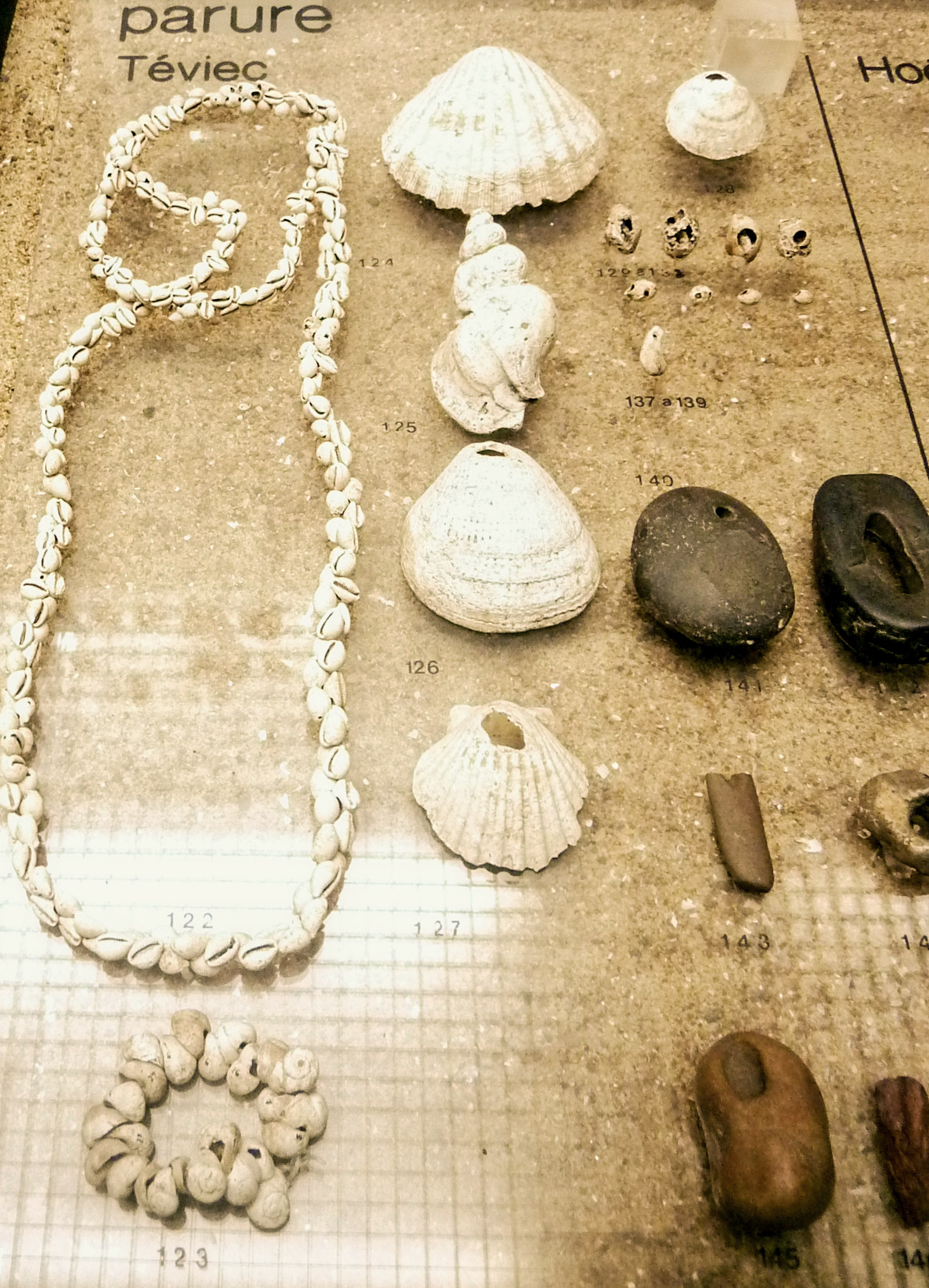
Shell necklaces and various ornaments found in one of the Mesolithic graves at Téviec.

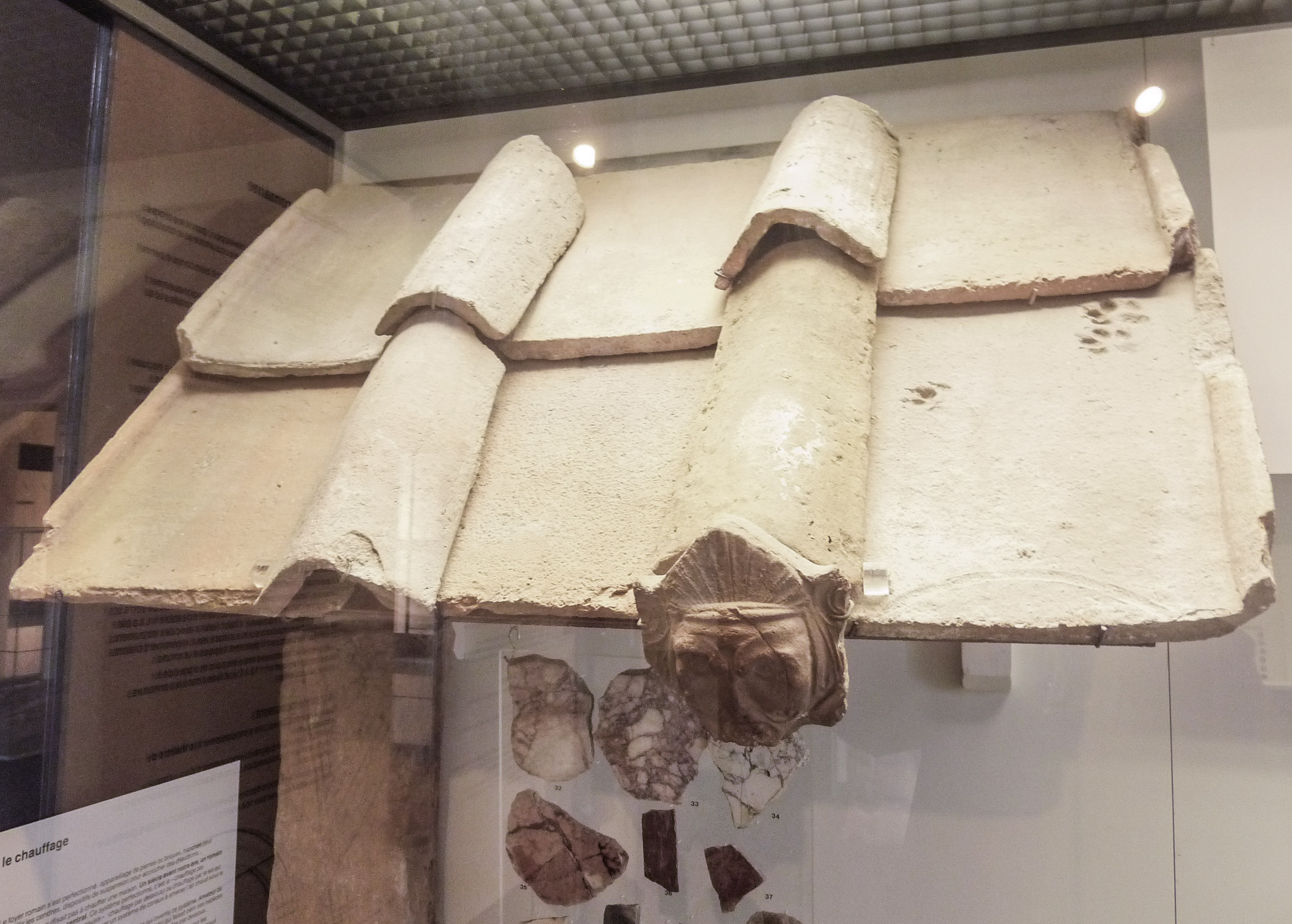
Reconstruction of part of the roof of the Gallo-Roman villa Les Bosséno in Carnac

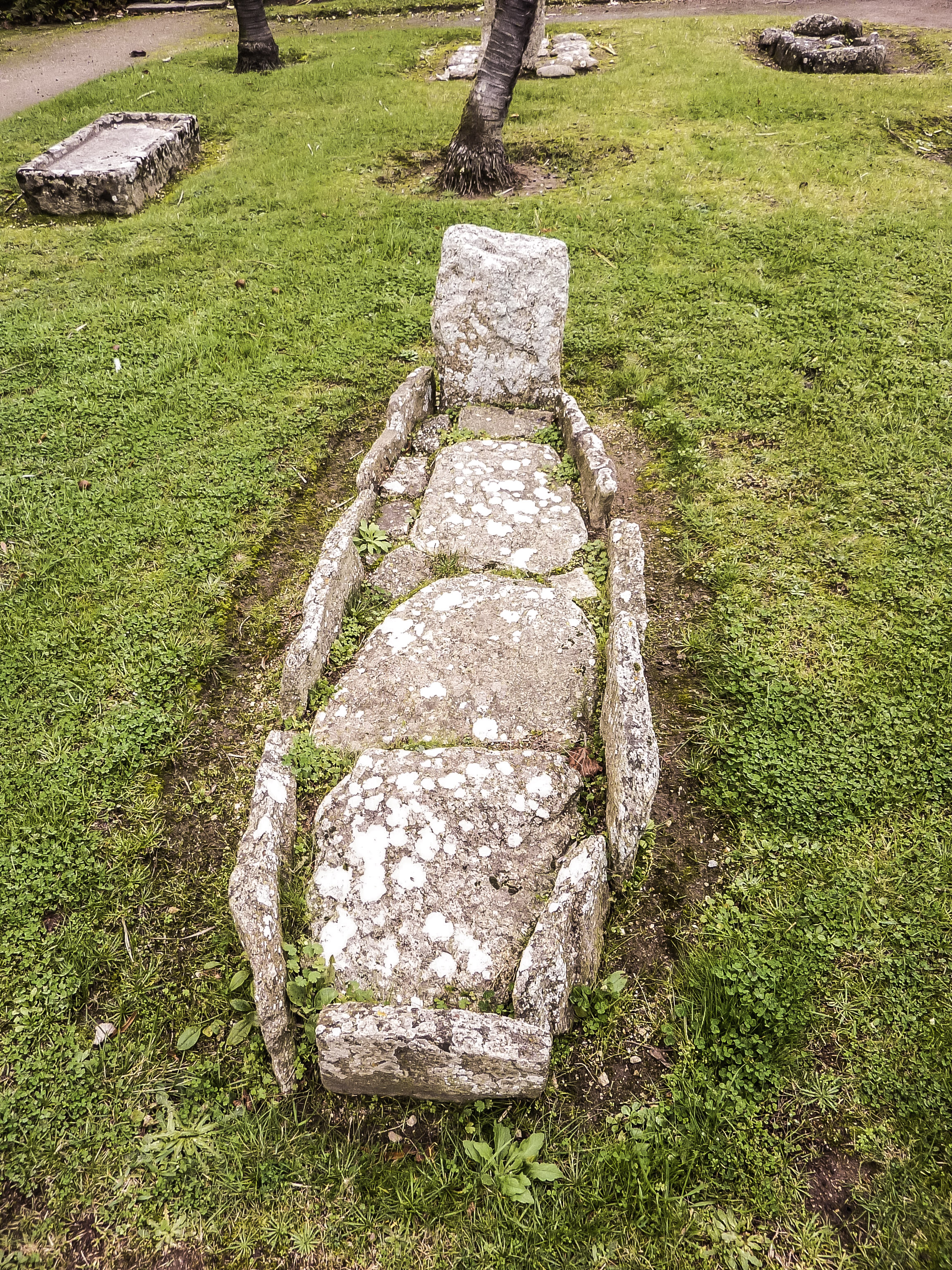
Tombs from the cemetery of the Saint-Clément chapel in Quiberon (dating from the 8th century AD; relocated to the garden of the Carnac Museum of Prehistory)

== Bibliography ==
- Agogué, Oliver (2021). Trésors de la préhistoire : Découverte des collections du Musée de Carnac [Treasures of Prehistory: Discovering the Collections of the Carnac Museum] (in French). Carnac et Châteaulin, Musée de Préhistoire de Carnac et Locus Solus. ISBN 978-2-36833-355-6.
- Jacq, Maurice (1940). Catalogue du Musée archéologique James Miln-Zacharie Le Rouzic [Catalogue of the James Miln-Zacharie Le Rouzic Archaeological Museum] (in French). Monument historique, Vannes.
- Le Rouzic, Zacharie (1894). Catalogue du Musée J. Miln à Carnac (Morbihan) [Catalogue of the J. Miln Museum in Carnac (Morbihan)] (in French). Vannes.
- Riskine, Anne-Élisabeth (2000). Le Musée de préhistoire : James Miln, Zacharie Le Rouzic : 450 000 ans d'histoire au pays de Carnac [The Museum of Prehistory: James Miln, Zacharie Le Rouzic – 450,000 years of history in the Carnac region] (in French). Musée de Préhistoire de Carnac. ISBN 2-9516092-0-5.
