= Kercado tumulus =

Cairn in Carnac, France

Coordinates: 47°35′44″N 3°03′15″W

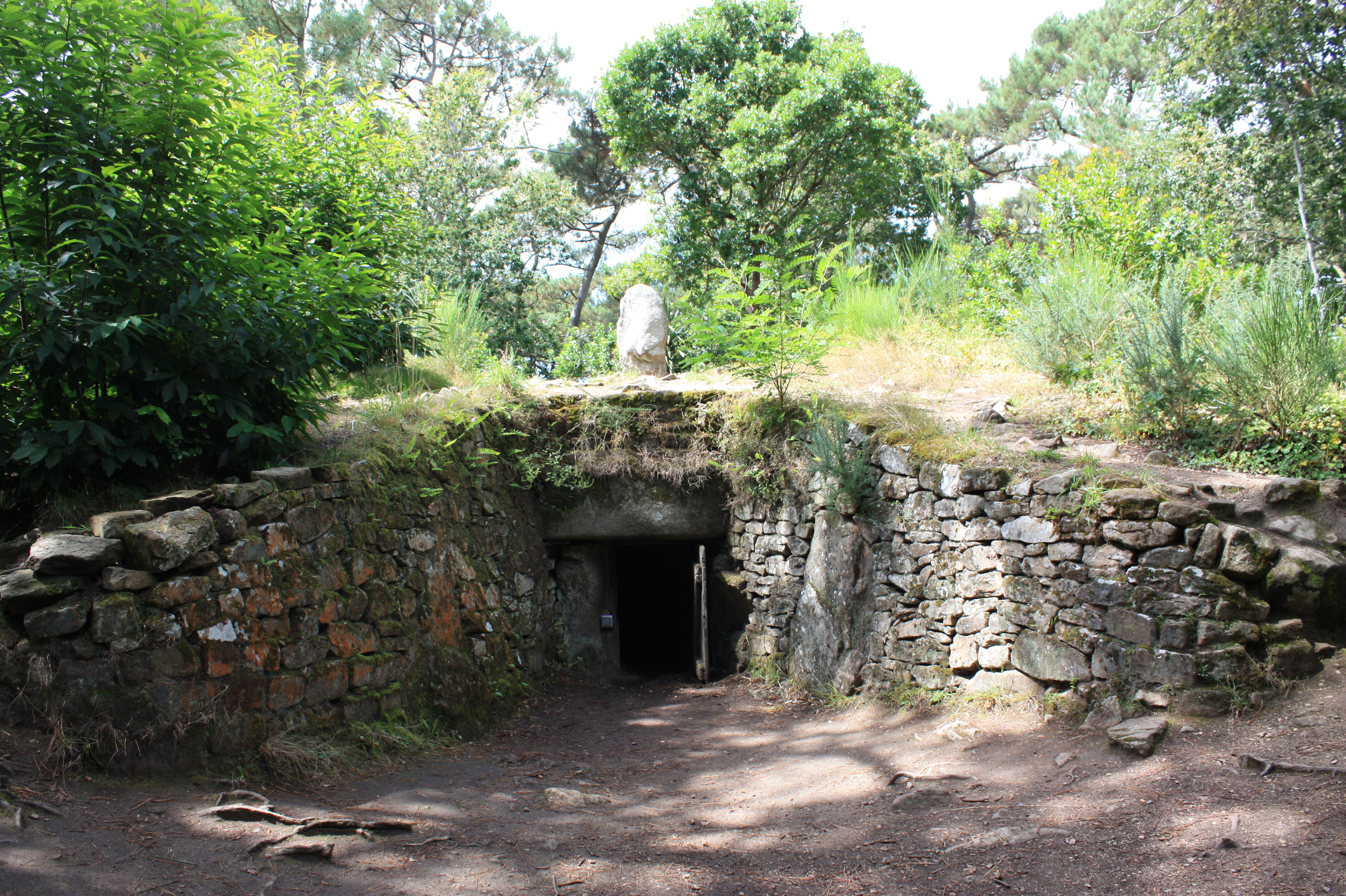
The Kercado tumulus

The Kercado tumulus is a chambered cairn located near Carnac in the French department of Morbihan, Brittany. The remarkably well-preserved tumulus contains a passage grave whose archaeological excavations have yielded a wealth of artifacts corresponding to its use during the Middle and Late Neolithic periods.

== History ==
The monument is located on a former manorial estate, which probably helped prevent the tumulus from being dismantled by local inhabitants to recover its constituent stones. The site is believed to have served as a hiding place for Chouan insurgents and army deserters in the 19th century. In 1863, it was excavated by René Galles; at that time, access to the interior of the tumulus was through an opening made at the top in the northeast corner of the chamber. The site was classified as a monument historique by decree of 27 December 1923. In 1925, Zacharie Le Rouzic excavated it before somewhat excessively restoring it.

== Description ==
The tumulus is circular in shape. It measures 30 metres (98 ft) in diameter and approximately 3.5 metres (11 ft) in height. It is made entirely of dry stones without any layer of interposed earth. Le Rouzic recorded that all the stones of the tumulus had been placed by hand, laid flat one on top of the other, all leaning towards the centre of the monument. The entire tumulus is surrounded by 27 small menhirs. The outer perimeter of the tumulus was paved fairly regularly with stones laid flat, measuring 3 metres (9.8 ft) wide on the east side, 4 metres (13 ft) to 6 metres (20 ft) on the west side, and 4 metres (13 ft) on the south side. Around the edge of this paving, Le Rouzic "unearthed twenty-seven blocks, both lying and standing, forming a semi-circular, or rather eccentric, enclosure around the tumulus, but the northern and north-eastern sections of which are missing"; these he straightened after discovering their wedge stones.

The tumulus contains a passage grave, opening to the south-south-east, comprising a single chamber. The passage is defined by nine orthostats (five on the north side, four on the south), partially surmounted by dry-stone walls. It measures 7.5 metres (25 ft) long and its width increases from 0.9 metres (3.0 ft) at the entrance to 1.2 metres (3.9 ft) near the chamber. The entire structure is covered by five capstones. The chamber is quadrangular in shape, 3 metres (9.8 ft) long by 2.9 metres (9.5 ft) wide. It measures 2.3 metres (7.5 ft) high at the centre. The chamber is bordered by eight orthostats surmounted by rather rough walls, all covered by a single capstone. The floor of the corridor and the chamber is paved. Le Rouzic discovered a cavity in the centre of the chamber, carved into the underlying bedrock, 0.6 metres (2.0 ft) long by 0.4 metres (1.3 ft) wide and 0.15 metres (0.49 ft) to 0.2 metres (0.66 ft) deep.

Two slabs in the corridor, as well as the southern support of the chamber entrance, feature engraved reticulated (net-like) decoration, similar to that observed at Mané-Kerioned and the Petit Mont Cairn. The northern support of the chamber entrance is in the form of an anthropomorphic figure. The chamber's roof slab is engraved with a "plough-axe" type motif, placed near the supports, suggesting reuse. The engraving has alternatively been interpreted as a depiction of scales or a whale.

== Archaeological artifacts ==
Galles discovered the chamber and corridor filled with a mixture of stones and earth to a height of approximately 1 metre (3.3 ft). The interior of the dolmen had not remained untouched, but it was possible to recover numerous human bones and some small funerary objects:

Excavations	Ceramics	Ornaments	Lithic objects	Miscellaneous	Conservation
Galles (1863)	* fragments of calciform vases decorated with dots	* 4 schist pendants, of which 1 is discoid * 1 large serpentine bead * 7 callaïs beads	* 1 sandstone axe * 2 jadeite axes * arrowheads * flint flakes	* bones * charcoal	Société polymathique du Morbihan
Le Rouzic (1925)	* 41 vases, including 12 calciform vases decorated with dotted lines and some footless vases	* 147 callaïs beads * 14 white beads of friable material * 2 solid gold plaques * 1 pendant and 1 fragment of a pendant made of schist	* 4 barbed and tanged arrowheads * 10 small flint blades * 7 flint scrapers and 2 quartz scrapers * 620 flint flakes and 83 quartz flakes * 9 cores * 6 fragments of polished diorite axes * 16 quartz hammerstones * 4 granite grinding stones and 1 small granite grinding stone * various pebbles	* Human bones and 17 human teeth * charcoal * various seashells * 1 piece of used iron peroxide	Musée de Préhistoire de Carnac

The study of the human remains found by Galles was carried out as early as 1863 by Gustave de Closmadeuc, a surgeon. According to Closmadeuc, the discovered bones were of human (adults and children) and animal (birds) origin. Most of these bones showed traces of wear.

The diversity of the discovered artifacts corresponds to a long period of occupation from the Middle Neolithic to the Late Neolithic.

== Dating ==
Radiocarbon dating of a piece of charcoal collected by Le Rouzic indicates a period between 5200 BC and 4360 BC. In 1965, Jean L'Helgouach considered that such dates "do not seem valid, having been made on material from old excavations and not having received confirmation", but in 1979 he admitted a dating of 4670 BC.
