= Saint-Michel tumulus =

Ancient grave mound in Brittany, France

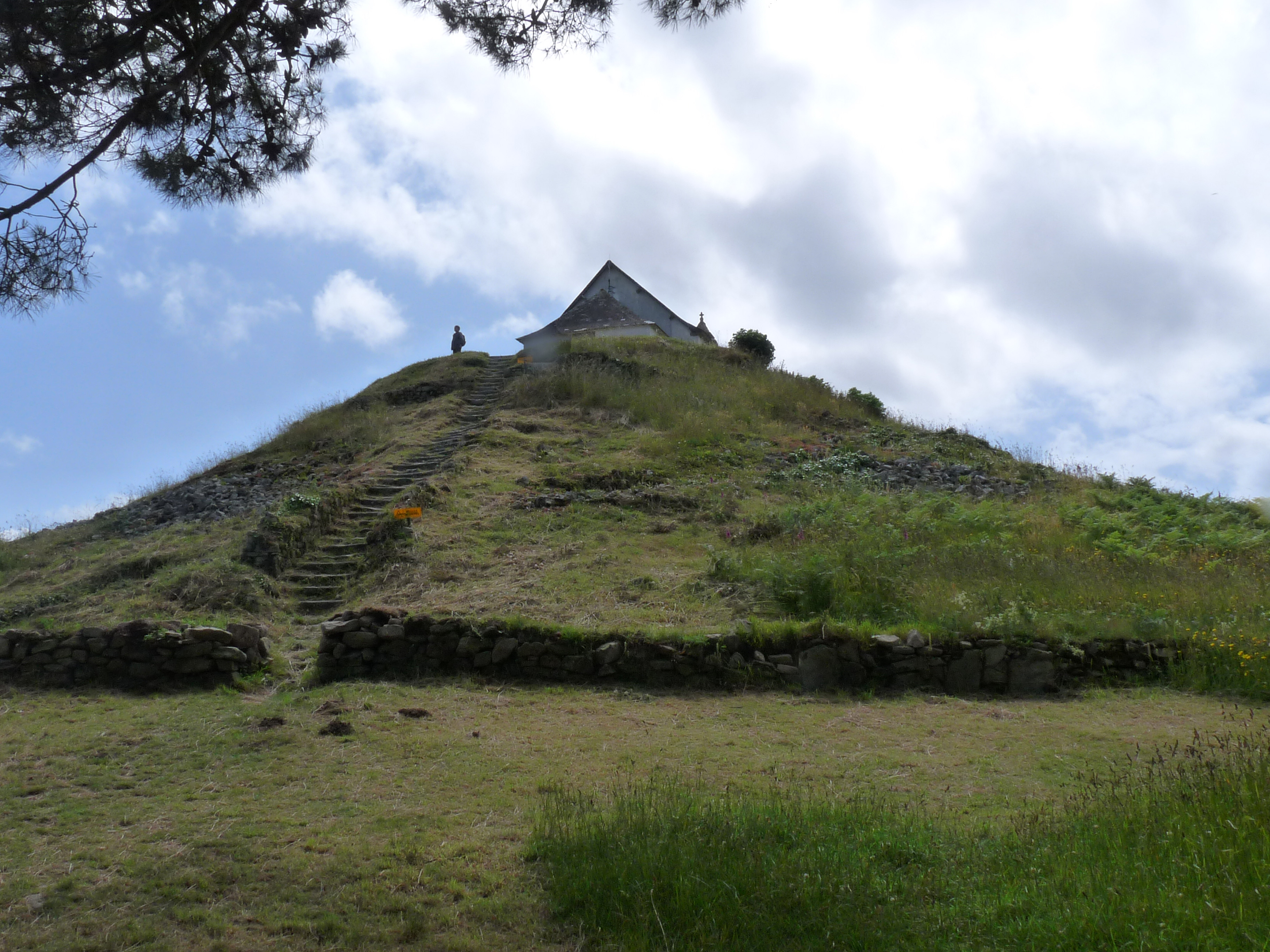

- Location in Brittany, France

General information
- Location: Carnac, Brittany, France
- Coordinates: 47.5879°N 3.0735°W
- Years built: c. 4500 BC

Height
- Height: 10 meters

Dimensions
- Diameter: 125 meters

Technical details
- Material: Stone

The Saint-Michel tumulus (Breton: tumulus Sant-Mikael) is a megalithic grave mound, located east of Carnac in Brittany, France. It is the largest grave mound in continental Europe.

== History ==
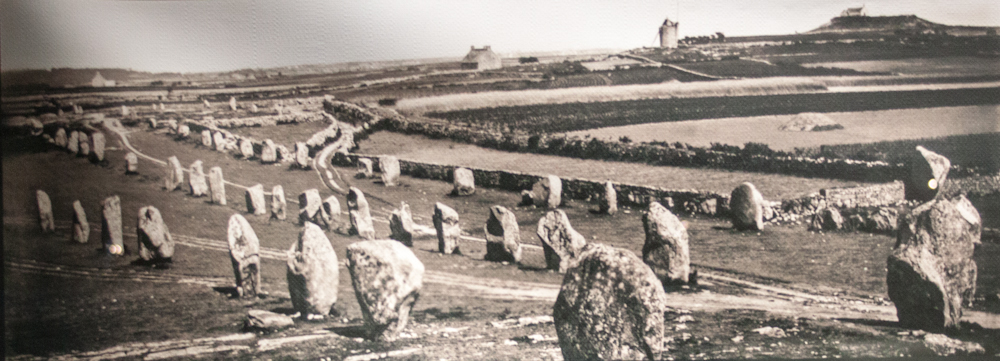
View of the Le Menec stone alignments with the Saint-Michel tumulus in the distance (top right)

The tumulus was built during the fifth millennium BC. It consists of a mound of earth and stones 125 metres (410 ft) long, 50 metres (160 ft) wide and 10 metres (33 ft) high. Explored in 1862, researchers found a central vault containing fairly prestigious funerary furniture: axes, pearls, flint tools, and sillimanite.

On 27 June 1795, the site served as the setting for the Battle of Saint-Michel Tumulus between the French and the British during the Great French War.

It has been classified as a "Monument historique" (National heritage site) since 1889.

Around 1900, the archaeologist Zacharie Le Rouzic again excavated the Saint-Michel tumulus and discovered a second dolmen and fifteen small stone chests, thus revealing the complexity of this monument.

== Gallery ==
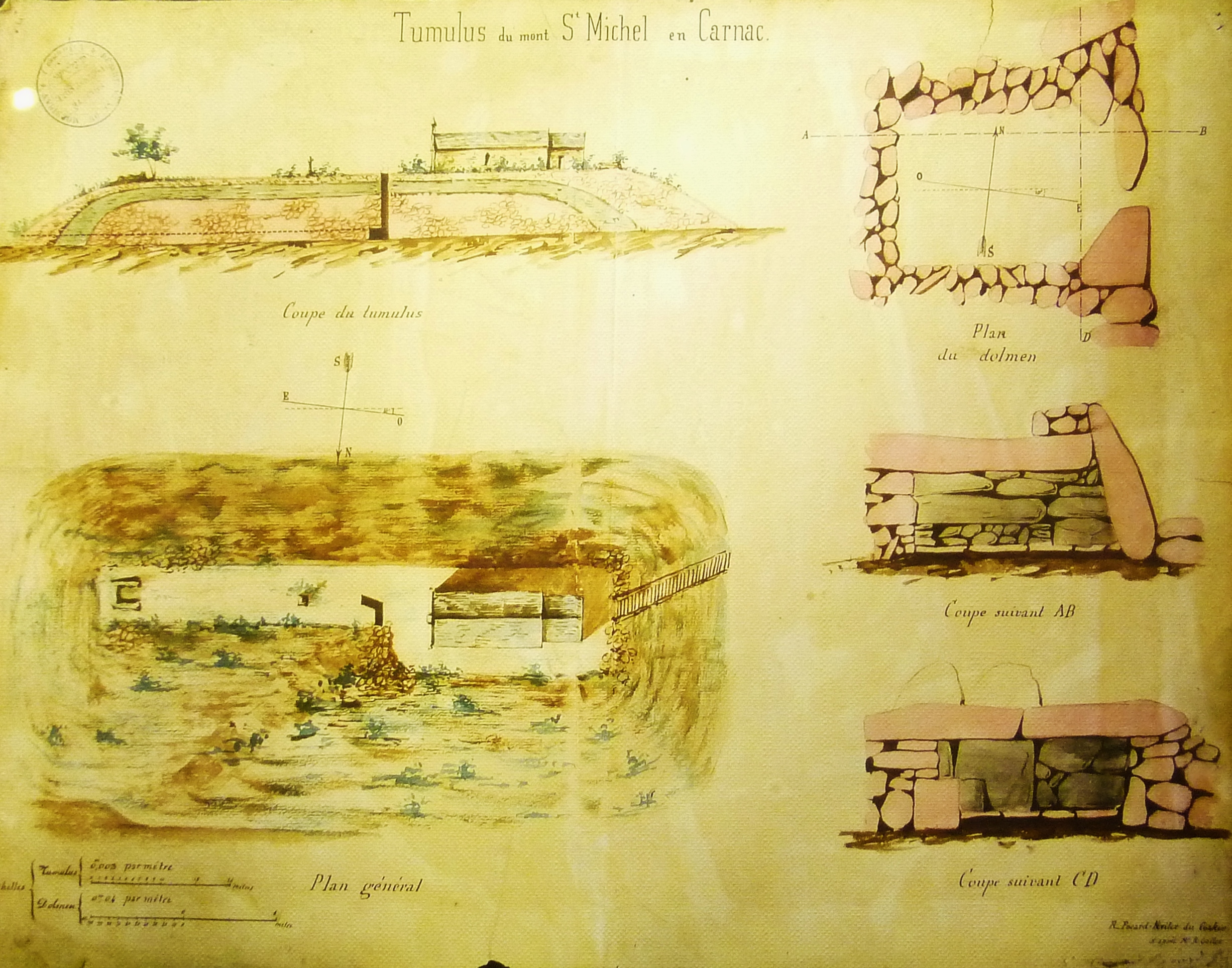

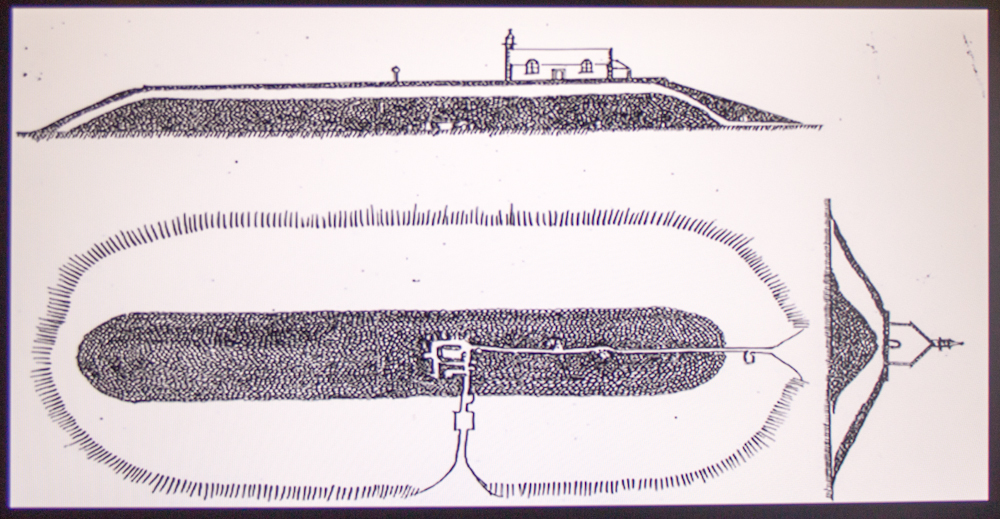

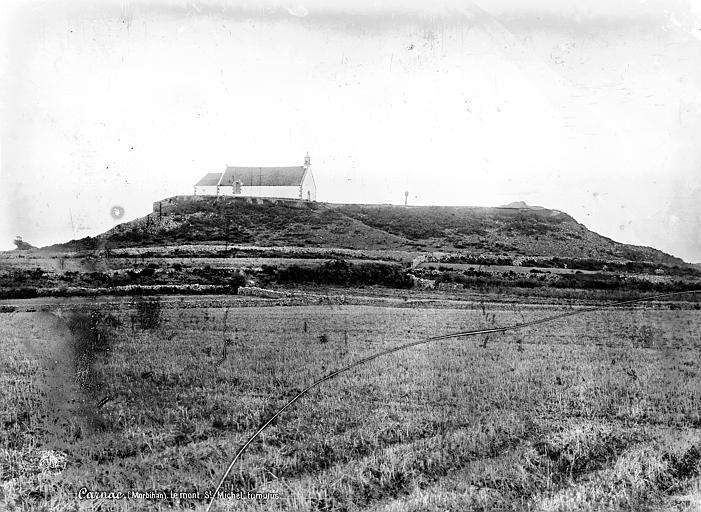

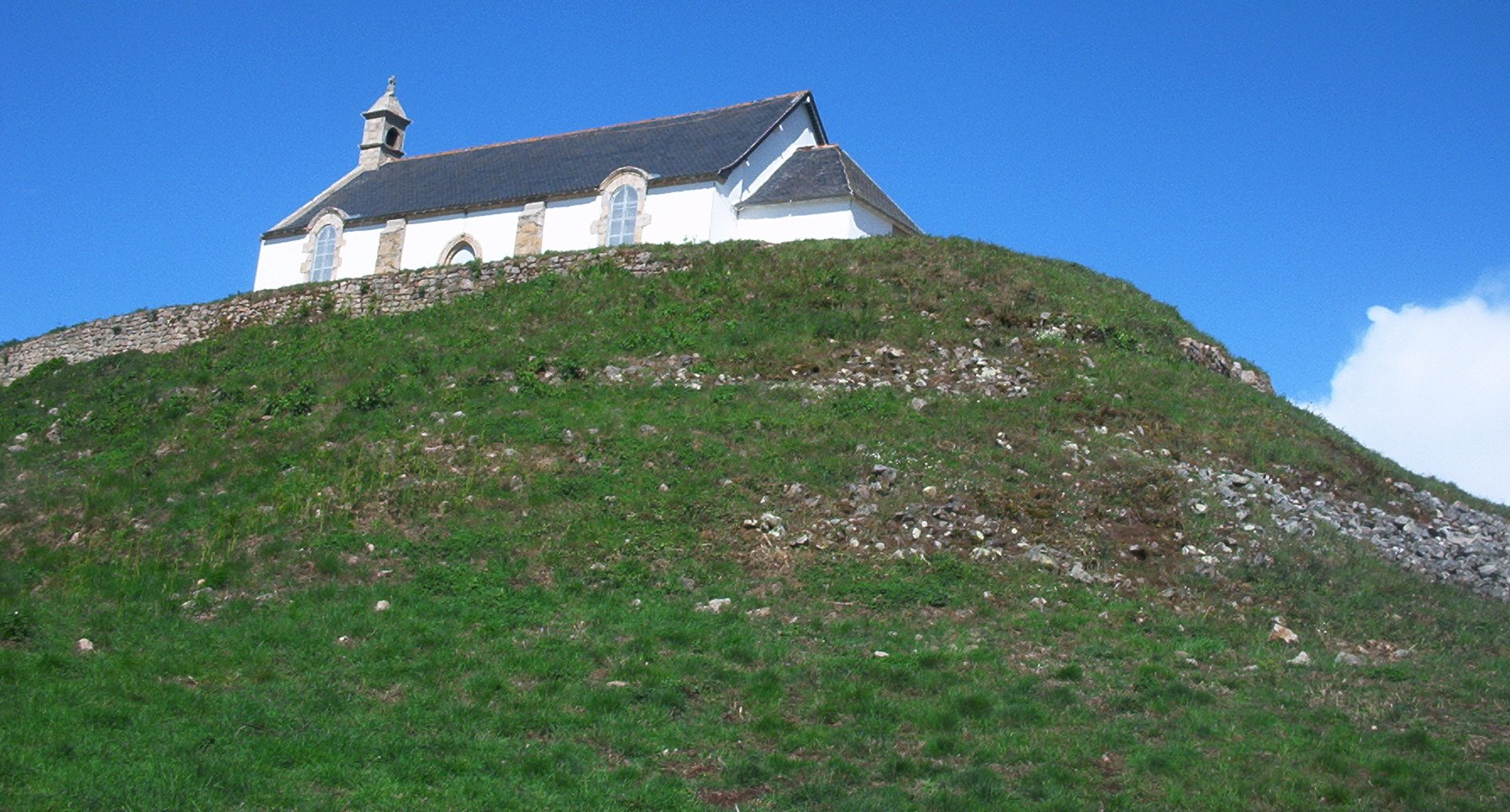

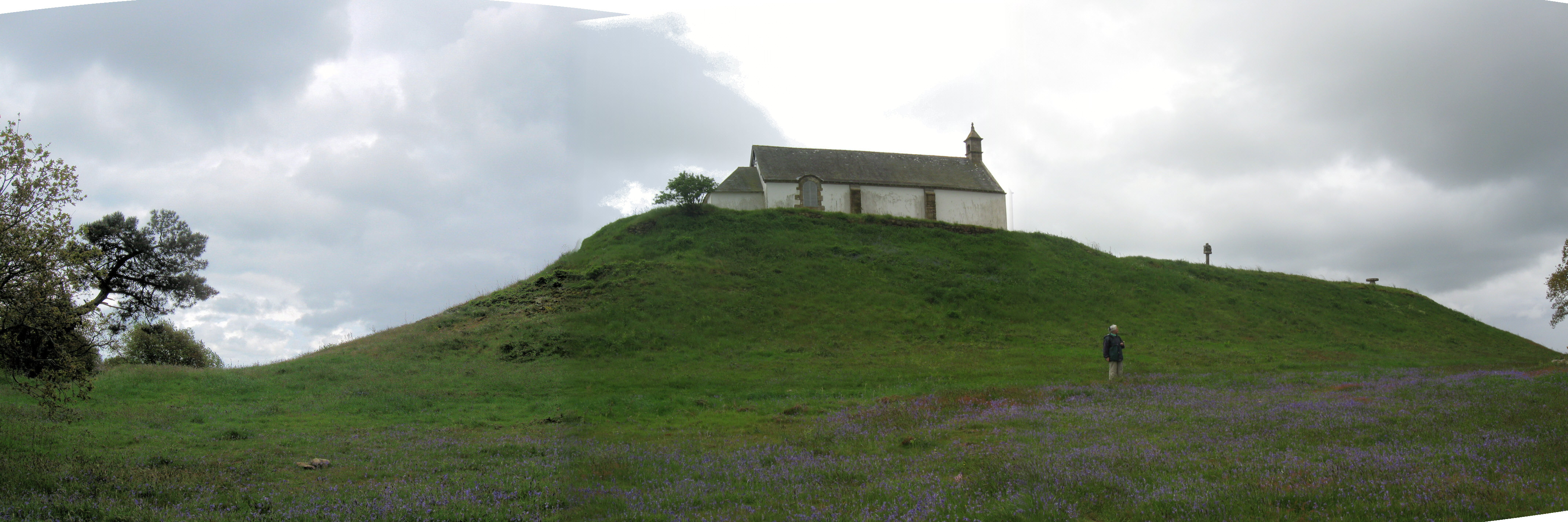

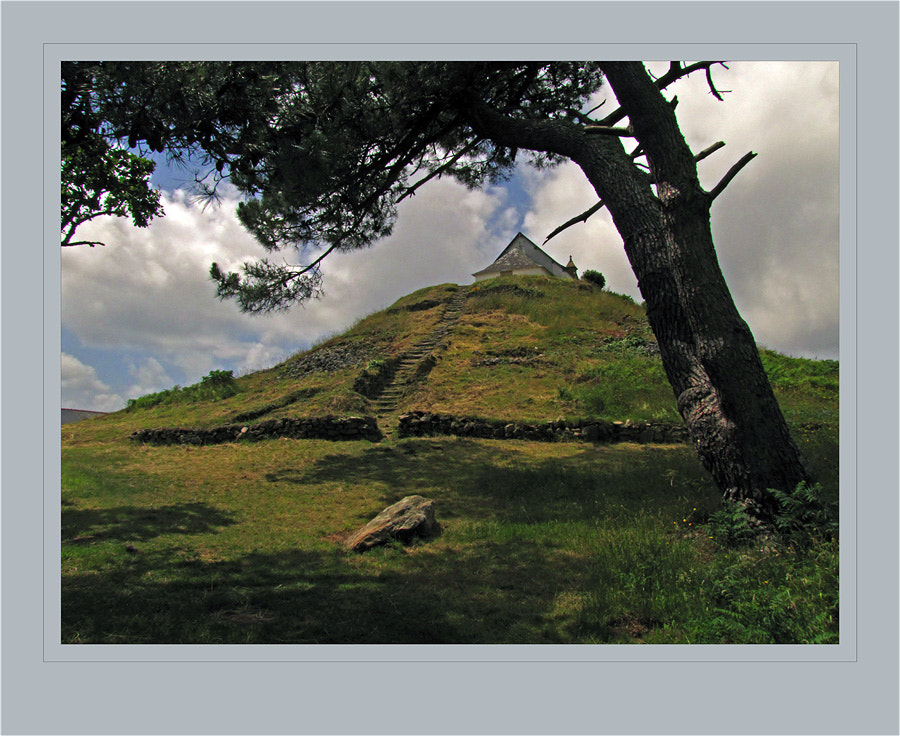

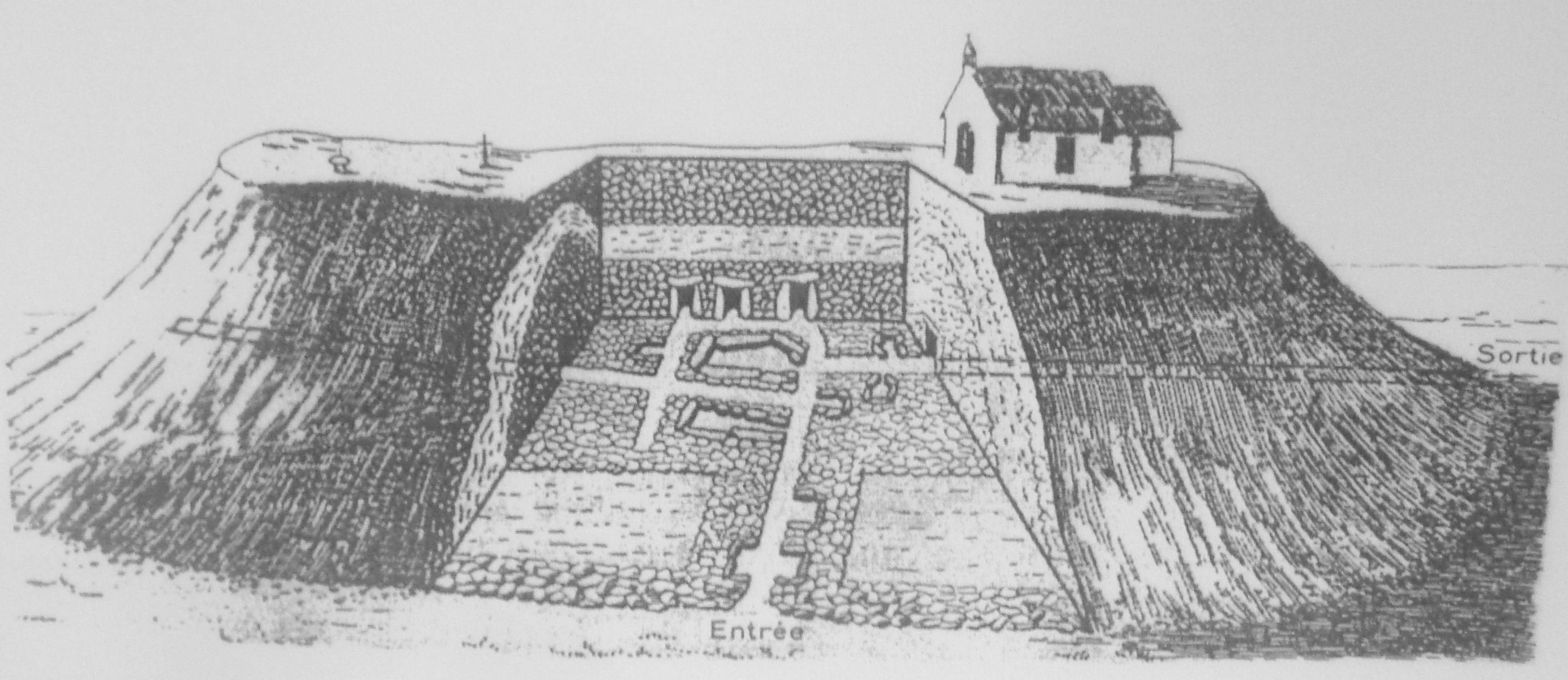
Saint-Michel tumulus plan by Zacharie Le Rouzic

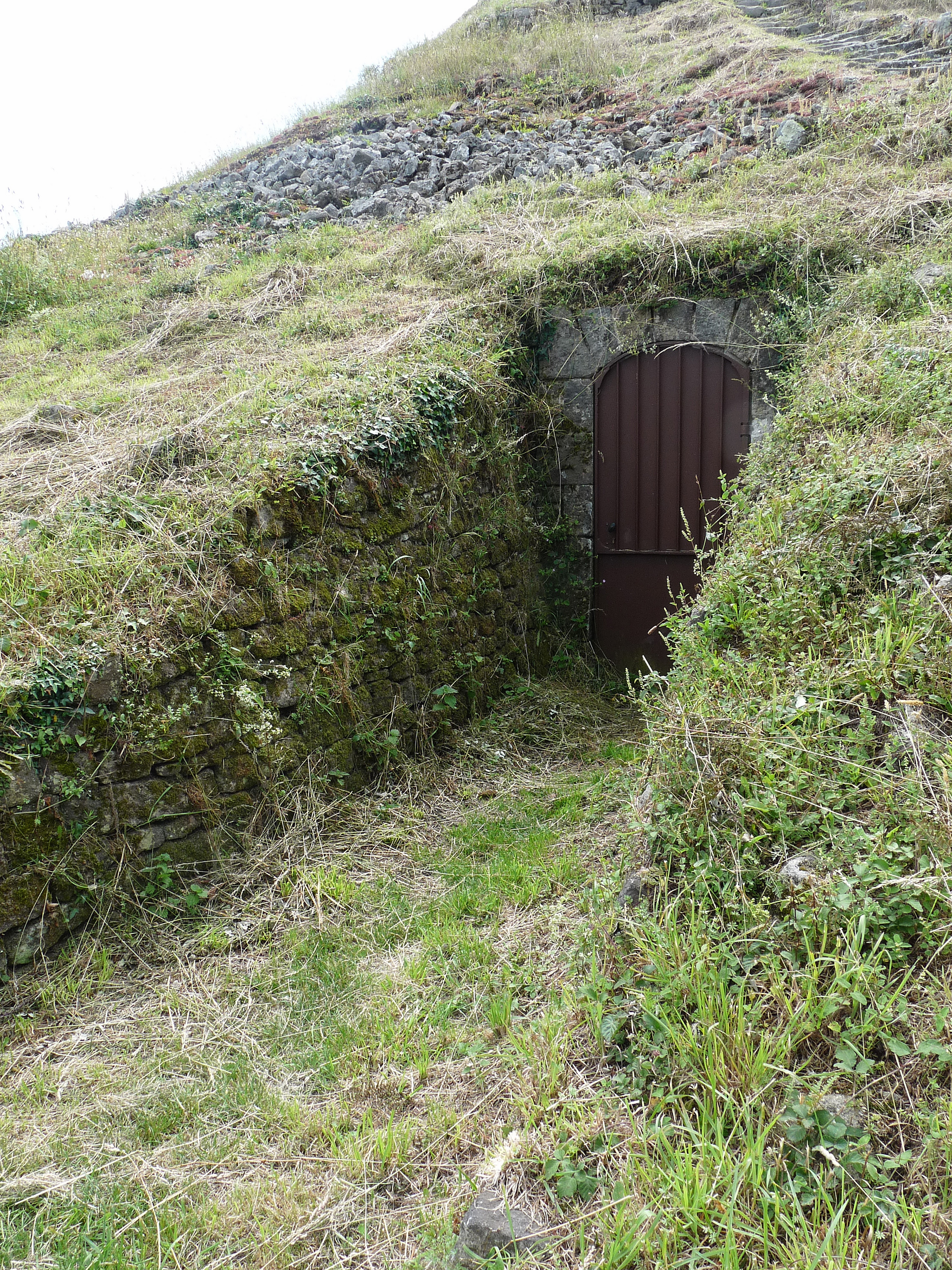
Excavation entrance to the tumulus

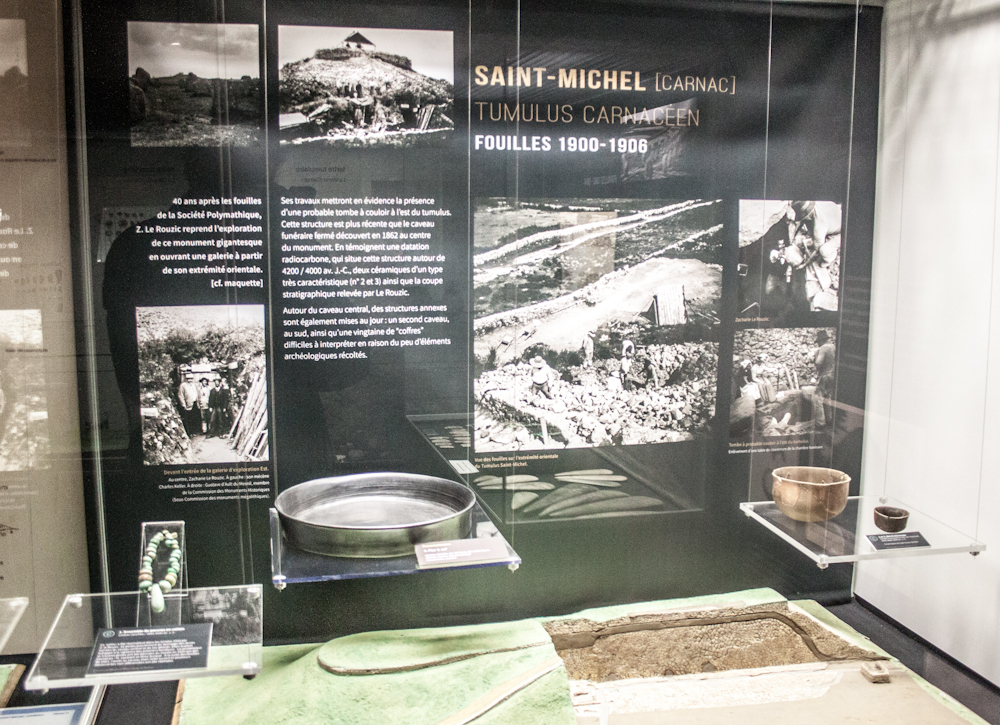
Finds from the Saint-Michel tumulus

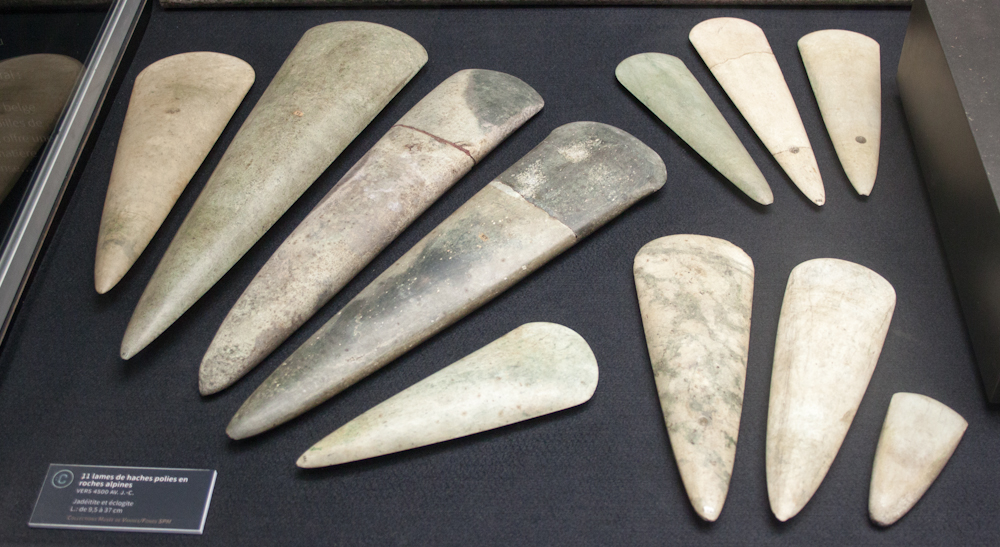
Jade axes from the tumulus

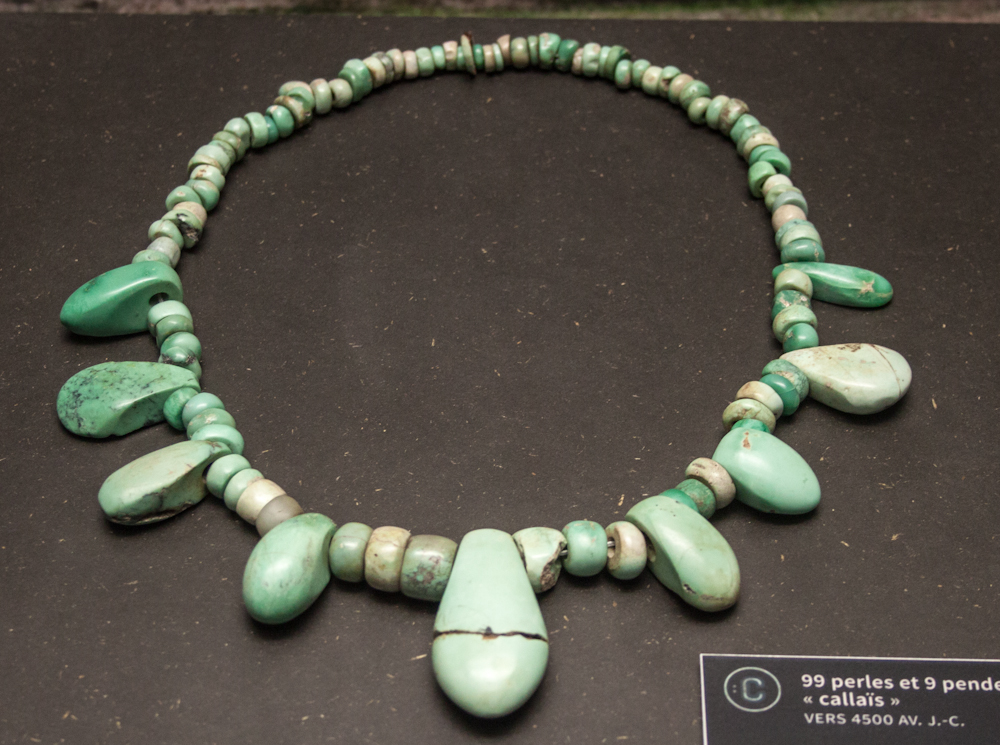
Callais necklace from the tumulus

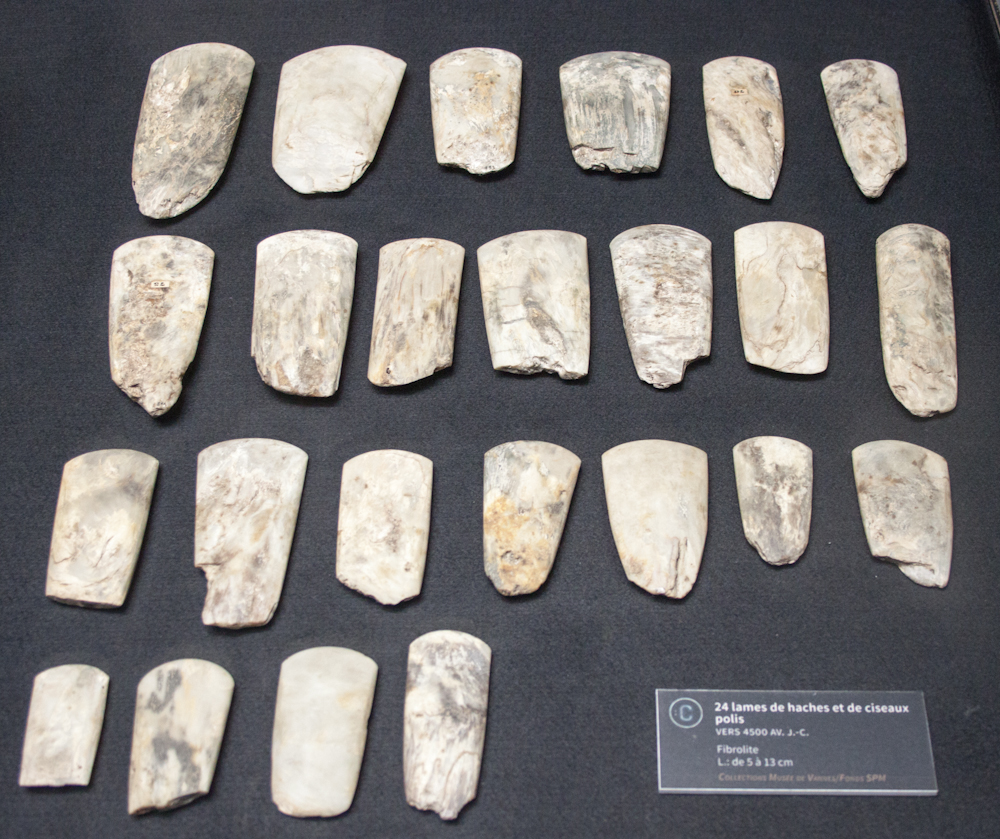
Broken stone axes from the tumulus
