= James Miln =

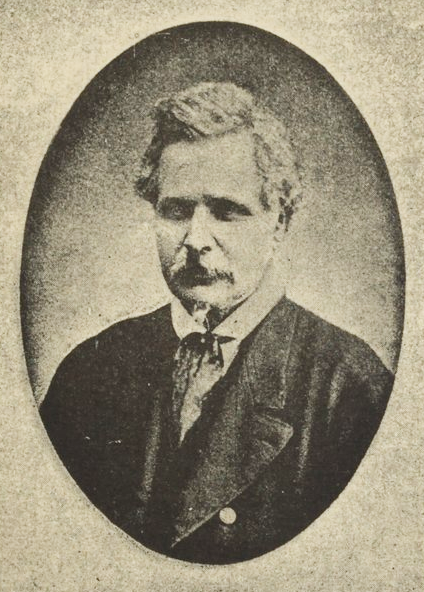
James Miln

James Miln (1819–1881) was a Scottish antiquary who excavated many sites around the French village of Carnac in Brittany from around the 1860s. He worked on Roman military camps and other Roman antiquities including the Bosseno Roman villa, but is remembered today for his studies of the Carnac stones. These had long been the subject of myth, and from the 1720s various people showed increasing interest in these features, but Miln was one of the first to carry out extensive excavations of the stones.

Miln was fascinated by these ancient monuments, and wrote "one is tempted to ask how it is that the Romans, masters of the world, came and disappeared, whilst the race of the rude constructors still remains". Towards 1875, he engaged a local boy, Zacharie Le Rouzic (1864-1939), as his assistant to carry his drawing materials as he surveyed the excavations, and Zacharie learnt archaeology on the job. Miln published his results, Excavations at Carnac, in 1877 and 1881.

After Miln's death in Glasgow, he left the results of his excavations to the town of Carnac, and the James Miln Museum was established there by his brother Robert to house the artefacts. Zacharie became the director of the Museum and an internationally recognised expert on megaliths in the region. He too left the results of his work to the town, and the museum is now named Le Musée de Préhistoire James Miln – Zacharie le Rouzic.

== Works ==
- Fouilles faites à Carnac : Morbihan : les Bossenno et le mont Saint-Michel, Paris, Didier, 1877 (on line);
  Excavations at Carnac : Brittany : a record of archaeological researches in the Bossenno and the Mont Saint-Michel, Edinburgh, D. Douglas, 1877 (on line).

Posthumous publications

- Fouilles faites à Carnac : Bretagne : les alignements de Kermario, ed. by Jean-François Luco, Rennes, Oberthur, 1881 (on line);
  Excavations at Carnac : Brittany : a record of archaeological researches in the alignments of Kermario, Edinburgh, D. Douglas, 1881 (on line).
- Jean-François Luco, James Miln et les trois sépultures circulaires explorées par lui dans la commune de Carnac : Morbihan, Tours, P. Bousrez, 1882.
  Extract of Congrès archéologique de France [Séances générales tenues à Vannes, en 1881], 48, Paris, 1882, p. 90-118 (on line).
- Quelques explorations archéologiques de feu James Miln, ed. by Jean-François Luco, Vannes, Galles, 1882–1883, 6 vol.
  Inside : I, Exploration des dolmens de Mané-er-Congre, en Locmariaquer, et de Mané-er-Gragueux, en Carnac; II, Exploration de trois sépultures circulaires en Carnac (2d ed.); III, Exploration des dolmens de la pointe et de la nécropole celtique de Mane Canaplaye : près de Saint-Philibert en Locmariaquer; IV, Explorations du Mané Roullarde : près de La Trinité-sur-Mer : Morbihan; V, Exploration de trois monuments quadrilatères; VI, Quelques explorations archéologiques.
  Before published in Bulletin de la Société polymathique du Morbihan (on line).

== Biographical elements ==
See Miln's Preface in Excavations at Carnac : Brittany : a record of archaeological researches in the Bossenno and the Mont Saint-Michel, 1877, p. V-VII.

- Ferdinand Fontès, « Allocution de M. Fontès en prenant le fauteuil de la présidence », in Bulletin de la Société polymathique du Morbihan, Vannes, 1881, p. 1-2 (on line).
- Jean-François Luco, « Notice sur les oeuvres archéologiques de feu James Miln », in Congrès archéologique de France [Séances générales tenues à Vannes, en 1881], 48, Paris, 1882, p. 62-73 (on line).
- Zacharie Le Rouzic, Catalogue du Musée J. Miln à Carnac, (Morbihan), Vannes, B. Le Beau, 1894, p. I-VI (en ligne).
- Anne-Elisabeth Riskine, Musée de préhistoire, James Miln, Zacharie Le Rouzic : 450 000 ans d'histoire au pays de Carnac, Carnac, Musée de préhistoire, 2000 (ISBN 2-9516092-0-5).
