= Er Lannic =

Island in Morbihan, France

Coordinates: 47°34′5″N 2°53′49″W

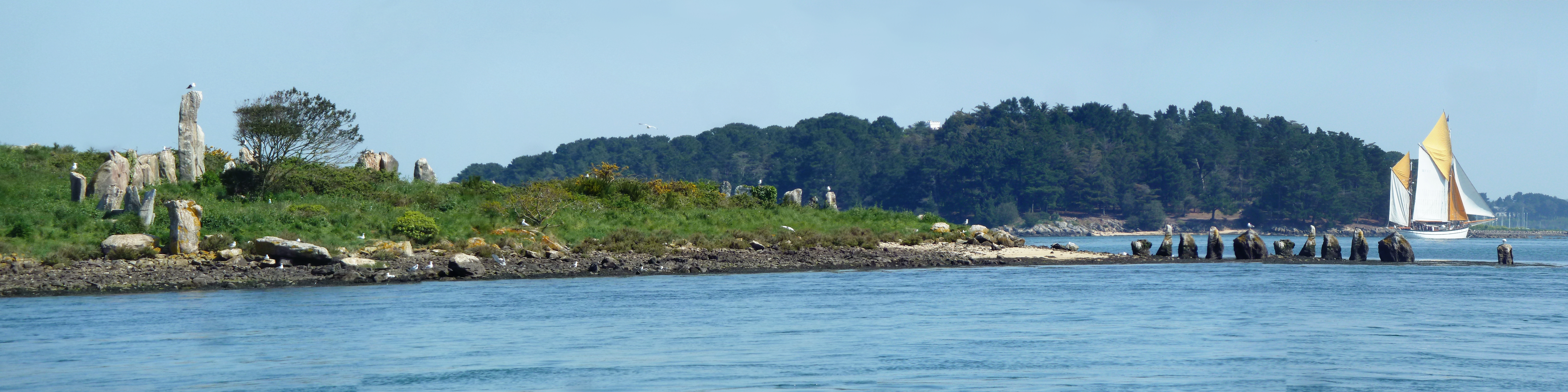
The cromlech of Er Lannic Island in the Gulf of Morbihan, Brittany (France). In the background is Berder Island, and at right the ship Étoile Molène

Er Lannic is a small island in the commune of Arzon, in the Morbihan department in Brittany in northwestern France. Er Lannic is a bird reserve and also the site of two stone circles, the southern of which is submerged.

== See also ==
- Gulf of Morbihan
- Gavrinis
