= Carnac =

Commune in Brittany, France, known for its Neolithic standing stones

Carnac Karnag (Breton)
- Commune
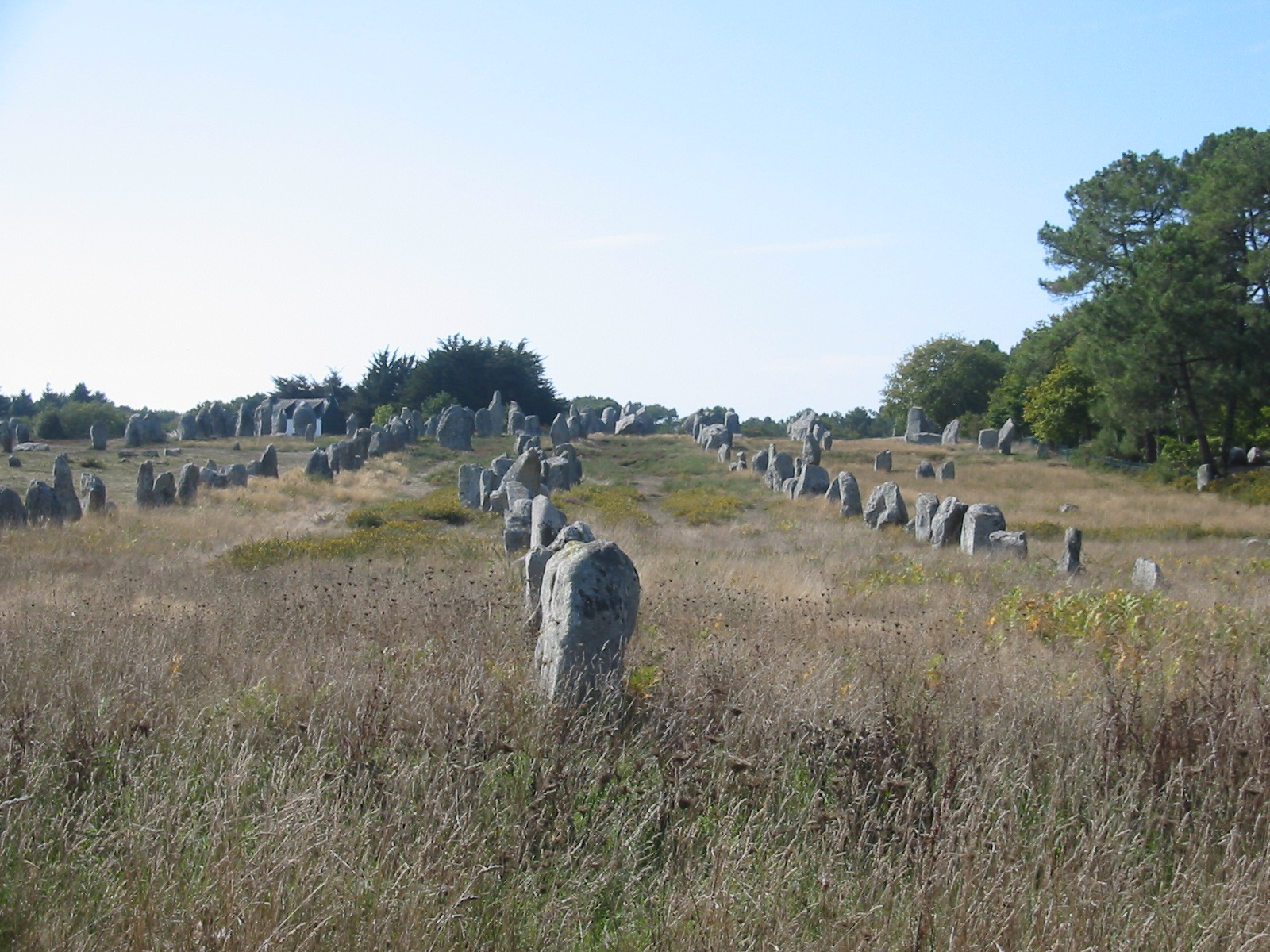
- Standing stones in the Kermario alignment

- Coat of arms
- Location of Carnac
- Location within France Location within Brittany
- Coordinates: 47°35′05″N 3°04′46″W
- Country: France
- Region: Brittany
- Department: Morbihan
- Arrondissement: Lorient
- Canton: Quiberon
- Intercommunality: Auray Quiberon Terre Atlantique

Government
  - Mayor (2026–32): Alexandre Lanoë
- Area^{1}: 32.71 km^{2} (12.63 sq mi)
- Elevation: 16 m (52 ft)
- Highest elevation: 45 m (148 ft)
- Lowest elevation: 0 m (0 ft)
- Population (2023): 4,194
  - Density: 128.2/km^{2} (332.1/sq mi)
- Time zone: UTC+01:00 (CET)
  - Summer (DST): UTC+02:00 (CEST)
- INSEE/Postal code: 56034 /56340
- ^{1} French Land Register data, which excludes lakes, ponds, glaciers > 1 km^{2} (0.386 sq mi or 247 acres) and river estuaries.

Carnac (French pronunciation: [kaʁnak]; Breton: Karnag, pronounced [ˈkaːʁnaɡ]) is a commune beside the Gulf of Morbihan on the south coast of Brittany in the Morbihan department in north-western France.

Its inhabitants are called Carnacois in French. Carnac is renowned for the Carnac stones – one of the most extensive Neolithic menhir collections in the world – as well as its beaches, which are popular with tourists.

Located on a narrow peninsula halfway between the medieval town Vannes and the seaside resort Quiberon, Carnac is split into two centres: Carnac-Ville and Carnac-Plage (the beachfront). In total there are five beaches, including la Grande Plage, and further to the east, Plage Men Dû and Beaumer.

== Map ==
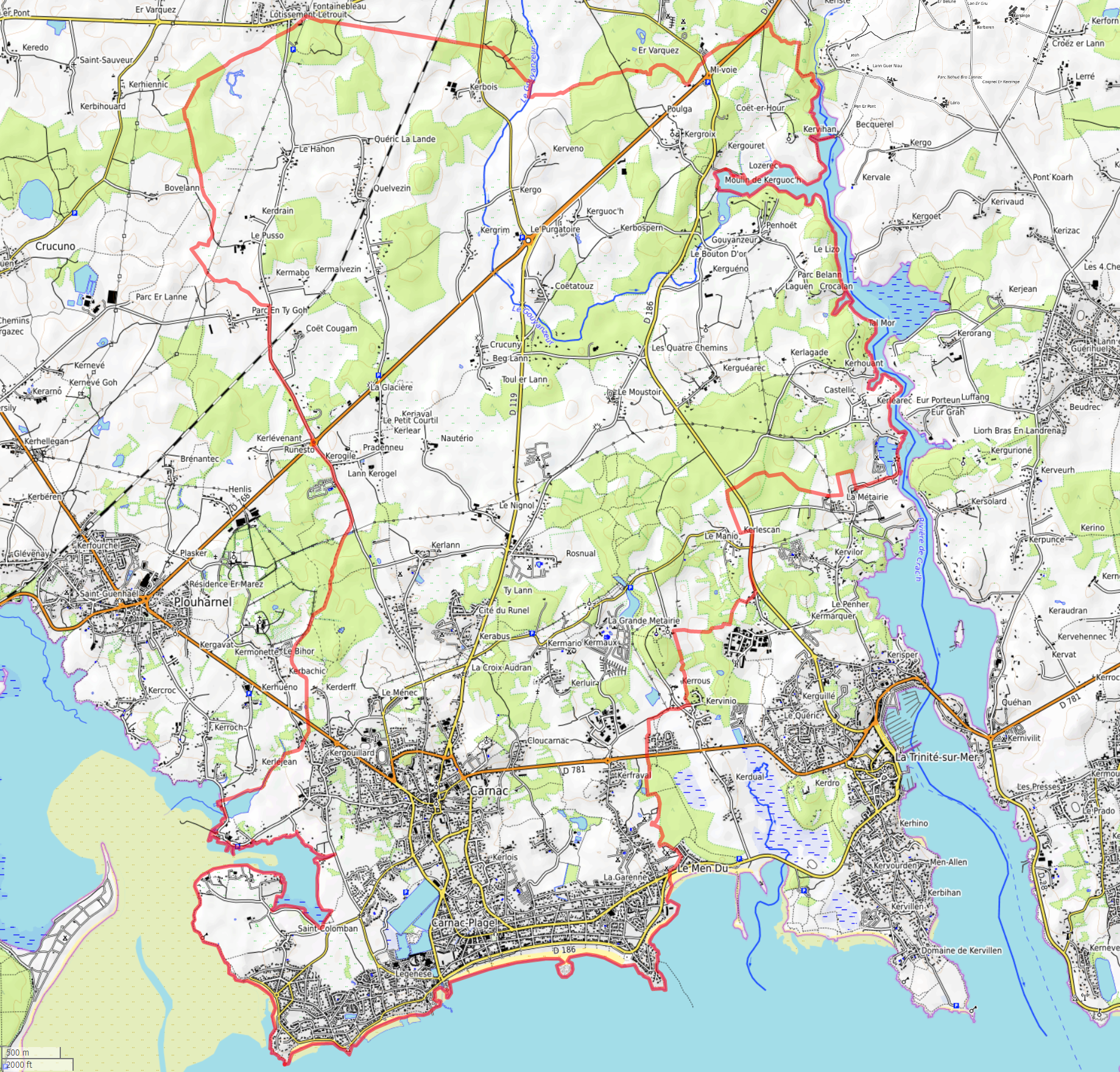
Topographic map

== Standing stones ==
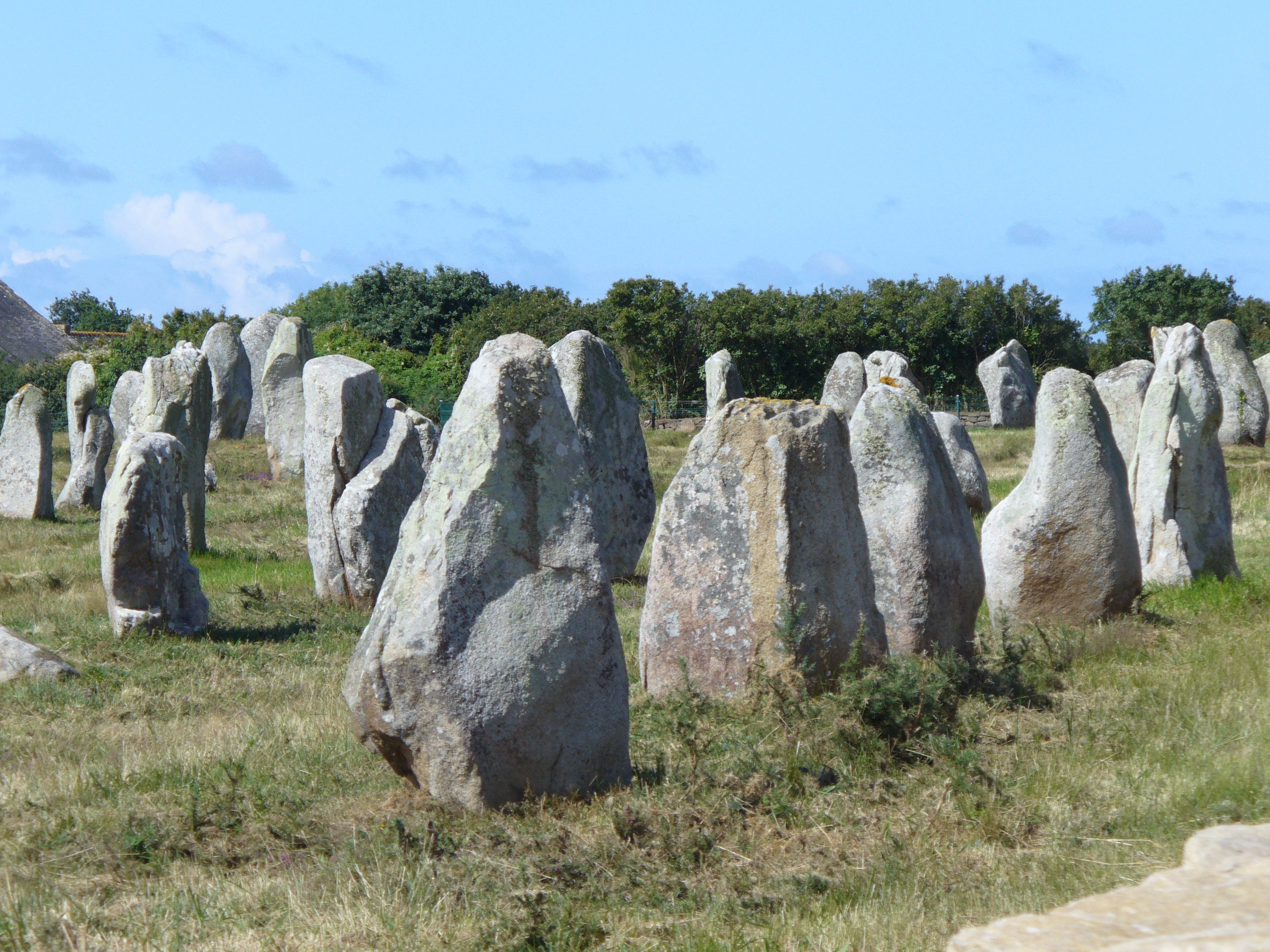
Stones in the Menec alignment

Carnac is famous as the site of more than 10,000 Neolithic standing stones, also known as menhirs. The stones were hewn from local rock and erected by the pre-Celtic people of Brittany. Local tradition claims that the reason they stand in such perfectly straight lines is that they are a Roman legion turned to stone by Pope Cornelius.

The Carnac stones were erected during the Neolithic period which lasted from around 4500 BC until 2000 BC. The precise date of the stones is difficult to ascertain as little dateable material has been found beneath them, but the site's main phase of activity is commonly attributed to c. 3300 BC. One interpretation of the site is that successive generations visited the site to erect a stone in honour of their ancestors.

== History ==
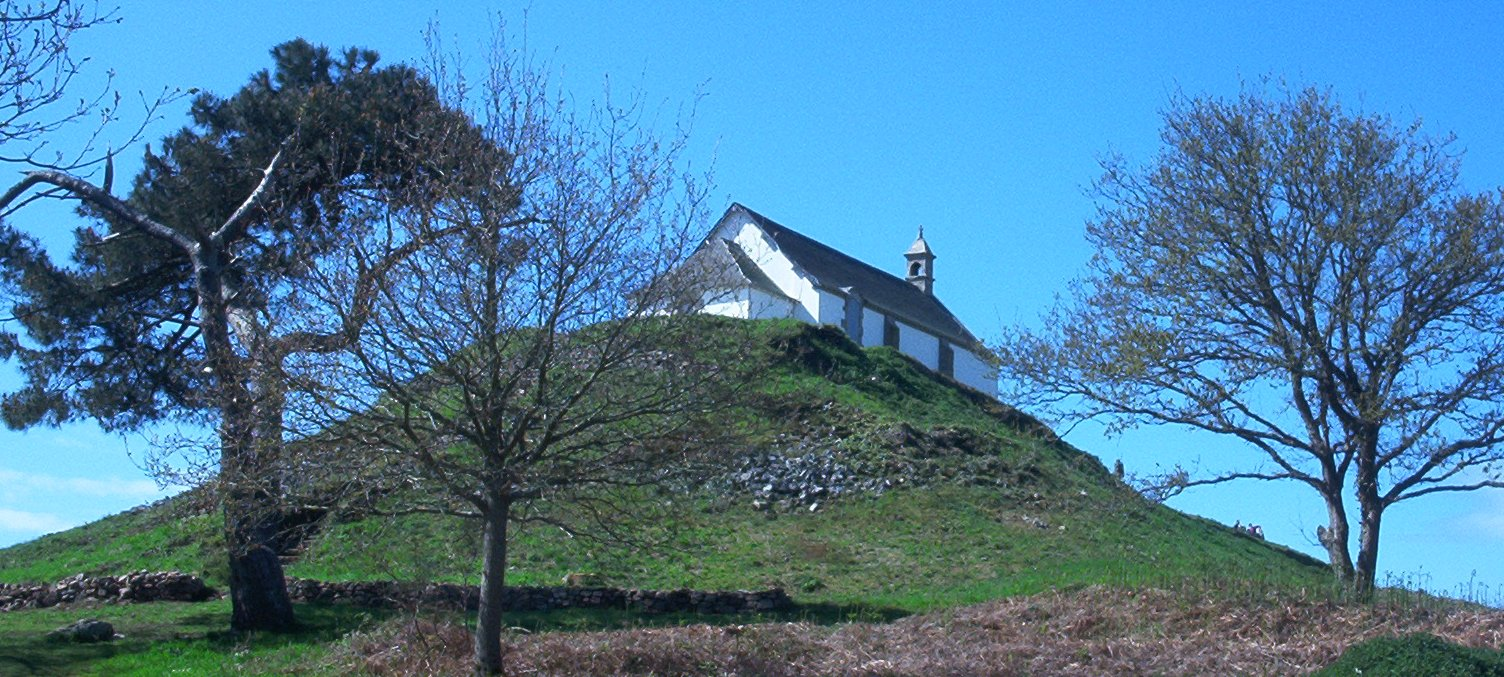
Tumulus of Saint-Michel

In 1864, La Trinité-sur-Mer and its port were separated from the commune to create their own commune and parish. The fishermen found the church in Saint-Cornély to be too far from the port, and had one built in a more convenient location. La Trinité-sur-Mer thus became both a parish and a separate commune.

In 1881, the Musée de Préhistoire de Carnac was opened to display archaeological artifacts gathered during excavations in Carnac.

In 1903, a seaside resort was created on the old salt flats, developing extensively through the 1950s to create the split Carnac of today: Carnac-ville and Carnac-plage. In 1974, a renowned hydrotherapy centre was sponsored by champion cyclist Louison Bobet, retiring after having won the Tour de France three times from 1953 to 1955.

In 1958, the place became a new tourism site to the astonishing direct line of stones and some people speculated that the stones were old graves.

== Tourism ==
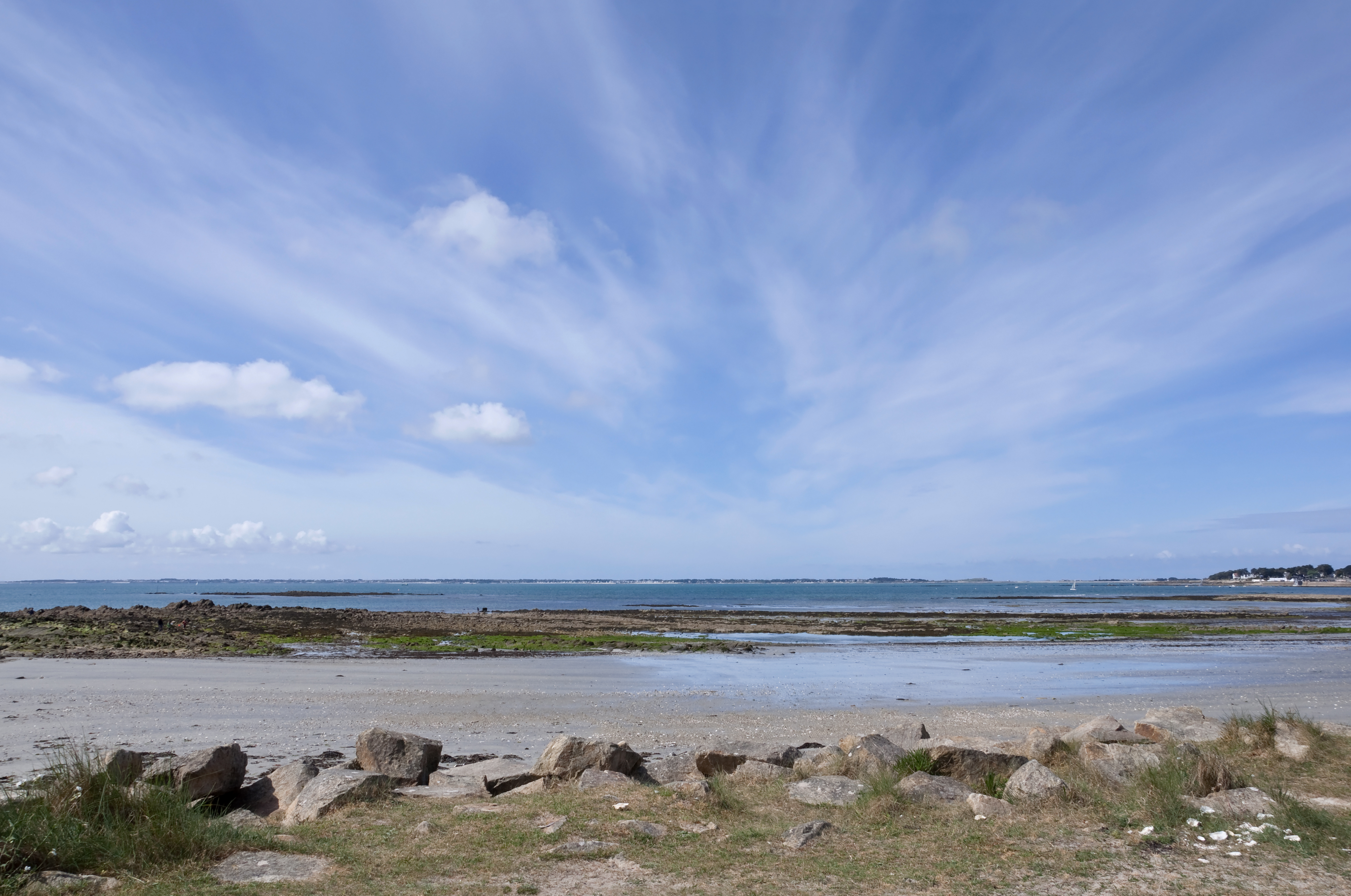
View of the Quiberon Bay from one of the Carnac beaches.

Since the end of World War II, Carnac has been a popular site for tourists seeking a break from the traditional destinations on the Côte d'Azur. During the July and August, the number of people in the town increases significantly with tourists and summer residents. The beaches of Brittany are rarely able to offer warm waters on par with those of their southern cousins; however, local factors have ensured that Carnac continues to attract large numbers of visitors. Wind and waves in the region attract day and cruise sailors. The standing stones and other monuments in the vicinity provide a cultural attraction and Carnac-Plage's variety of bars and clubs provide entertainment at night.

There are a number of camping grounds in the woods around Carnac, some clustered around lakes such as the Étang du moulin du lac, which lies immediately west of the river Crac'h. Other campsites nearby include Camping le Moulin de Kermaux, Des Menhirs and La Grande Metairie.

The geography of the Bay of Quiberon provides ideal conditions for sailing. The Peninsula of Quiberon provides protection from Atlantic waves and turbulence while allowing the Gulf Winds to enter the bay.

For windsurfers, the Saint-Colomban beach is in Carnac-Plage. The beach is very popular with windsurfers, as its position allows for the best exploitation of strong winds from the west. Other beaches in the area provide equal access to the winds of the bay but windsurfers may find themselves frustrated in the areas of dead air close to their shores.

Other beaches are Bihan Plage, Légenèse Plage, Grande Plage, Beaumer Plage and Men-Du Plage.

As of 2020, 70.6% of the properties were holiday homes, one of the highest percentages in Morbihan.

The Musée de Préhistoire de Carnac attracted 36,688 visitors in 2019.

== Neighbouring communes ==
Carnac is connected to La Trinité-sur-Mer to the east by road and by a shared pedestrian-and-bike path along the beach. The other neighbouring communes are Crac'h, Erdeven, Ploemel and Plouharnel.

== Population ==
Historical population
Year	Pop.	±% p.a.
1968	3,655	—
1975	3,733	+0.30%
1982	3,962	+0.85%
1990	4,243	+0.86%
1999	4,444	+0.52%
2007	4,436	−0.02%
2012	4,204	−1.07%
2017	4,251	+0.22%
2023	4,194	−0.22%
Source: INSEE

Inhabitants of Carnac are called Carnacois in French.

== Breton language ==
In 2008, the municipality launched a linguistic plan and signed an agreement to encourage and facilitate the translation of municipal documents and news materials into the Breton language.

In 2009, 11.03% of children attended bilingual schools in primary education.

== See also ==
- Standing stones
- Carnac stones
- Communes of the Morbihan department
- List of archaeoastronomical sites sorted by country
- List of megalithic sites
- Musée de Préhistoire de Carnac
