= List of works by Jules-Charles Le Bozec =

Jules-Charles Le Bozec (1898–1973) was a French sculptor.

== Design drawing for the work Cincinnatus ==
Le Bozec was a pupil at Paris' École nationale supérieure Beaux-arts where he was taught by Jean Boucher. In 1926 he submitted a design for the school's annual Bridan competition for a Figure dessinée d'après l'antique this entitled Cincinnatus and he won the second prize. The school have kept the drawing in their collection of the work of ex-pupils.

== The Breton War Memorial at Sainte-Anne-d'Auray ==
This memorial takes the form of a mausoleum originally dedicated to the 240,000 Bretons who gave their lives in the 1914-1918 war but subsequently also remembering those lost in the 1939-1945 war and other conflicts. The mausoleum is 52 metres high and the crypt has five apses these representing the five dioceses of Brittany. The names of those honoured are engraved on the mausoleum walls. The mausoleum is located next to the Saint Anne Basilica and has long been a special place of pilgrimage for Bretons.

When the 1914-1918 war ended, the Pope declared St Anne "patron of Brittany" and, as with all of France, Brittany was left in 1918 traumatized and bereaved and in 1920 Monseigneur Célime Gouraud, Bishop of Vannes along with the other four Breton diocesan bishops, proposed the creation of a place of remembrance for all those lost. An architectural competition was launched and René Ménard of Nantes was given the commission. The crypt was inaugurated in 1928 and the esplanade and coupole finished in 1932 and the surrounding wall was decorated with the "stations of the cross" by Jacques Ballandre and completed from 1932 to 1934. On either side of the entry to the crypt are Le Bozec's two bas-reliefs depicting "Victory" and "Peace" and in each of the five apses are granite altars of which those for the dioceses of Vannes, Nantes and Saint-Brieuc were also by Le Bozec. At the entrance to the site of the memorial is a plaque explaining the significance of the memorial and finishing with the prayer:

Recueillez-vous. Priez DIEU/Plus jamais, jamais, la guerre/Seigneur, donne-nous la Paix.

== Gouarec War Memorial ==
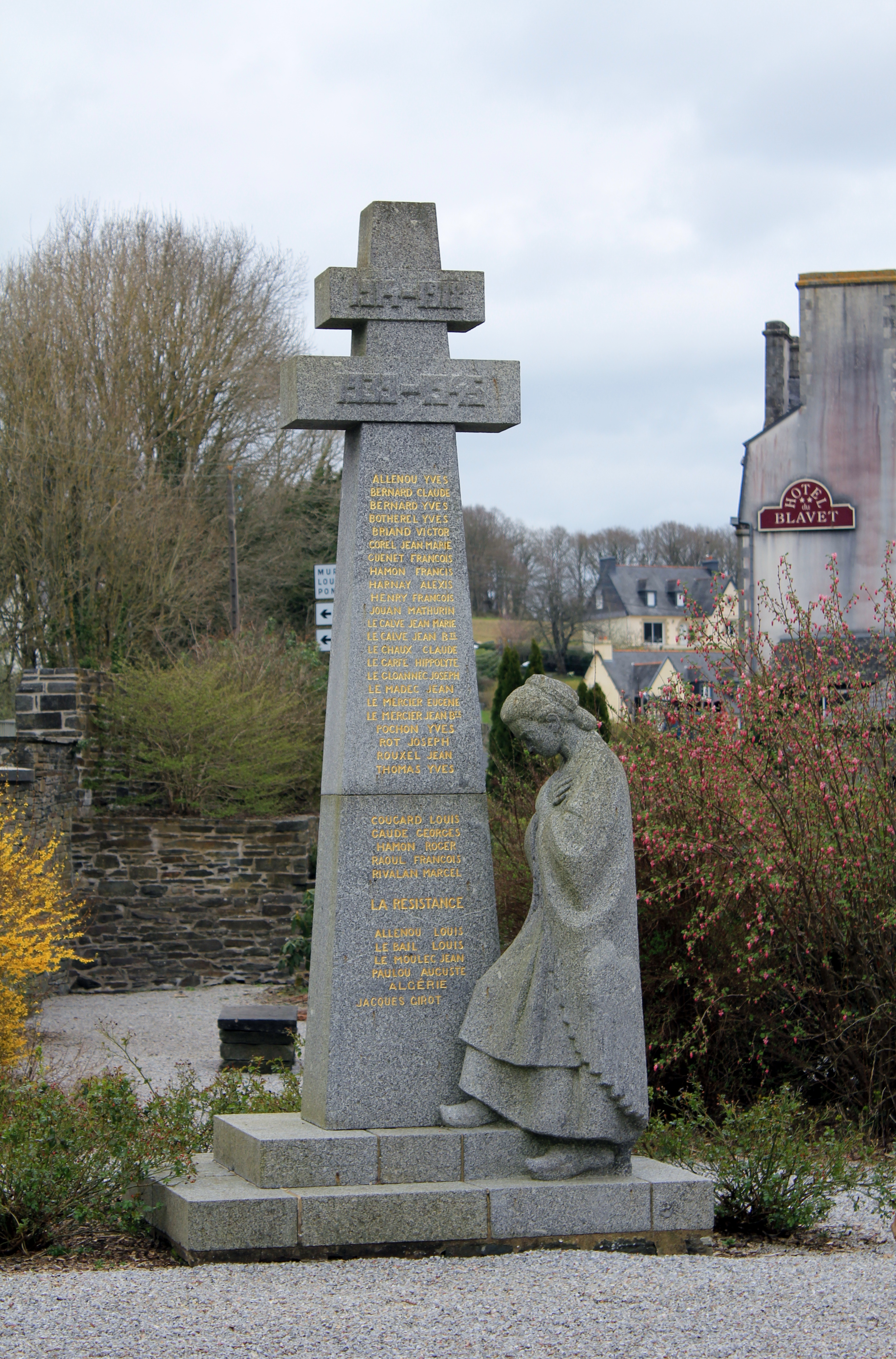
Gouarec War Memorial

Le Bozec sculpted the figure of a young widow in local peasant dress who stands before the pedestal on which her husband's name is inscribed, along with those of all the men of Gouarec who died in the 1914-1918 war.

== Figure décorative ==
This 1938 Le Bozec sculpture can be seen in the Saint-Brieuc town hall.

== Monument to Paul Le Goff ==
In Saint-Brieuc's Parc des Promenades is a monument honouring the sculptor Paul Le Goff. It comprises a granite pedestal with Le Bozec's portrait medallion of Le Goff, and in front of the pedestal stands the sculpture of a Breton woman wearing a large Plérin cap. The monument was unveiled on 29 May 1938 by the French president Albert Lebrun. Paul was the son of Élie Le Goff.

== The statue Notre-Dame de Kerdro ==
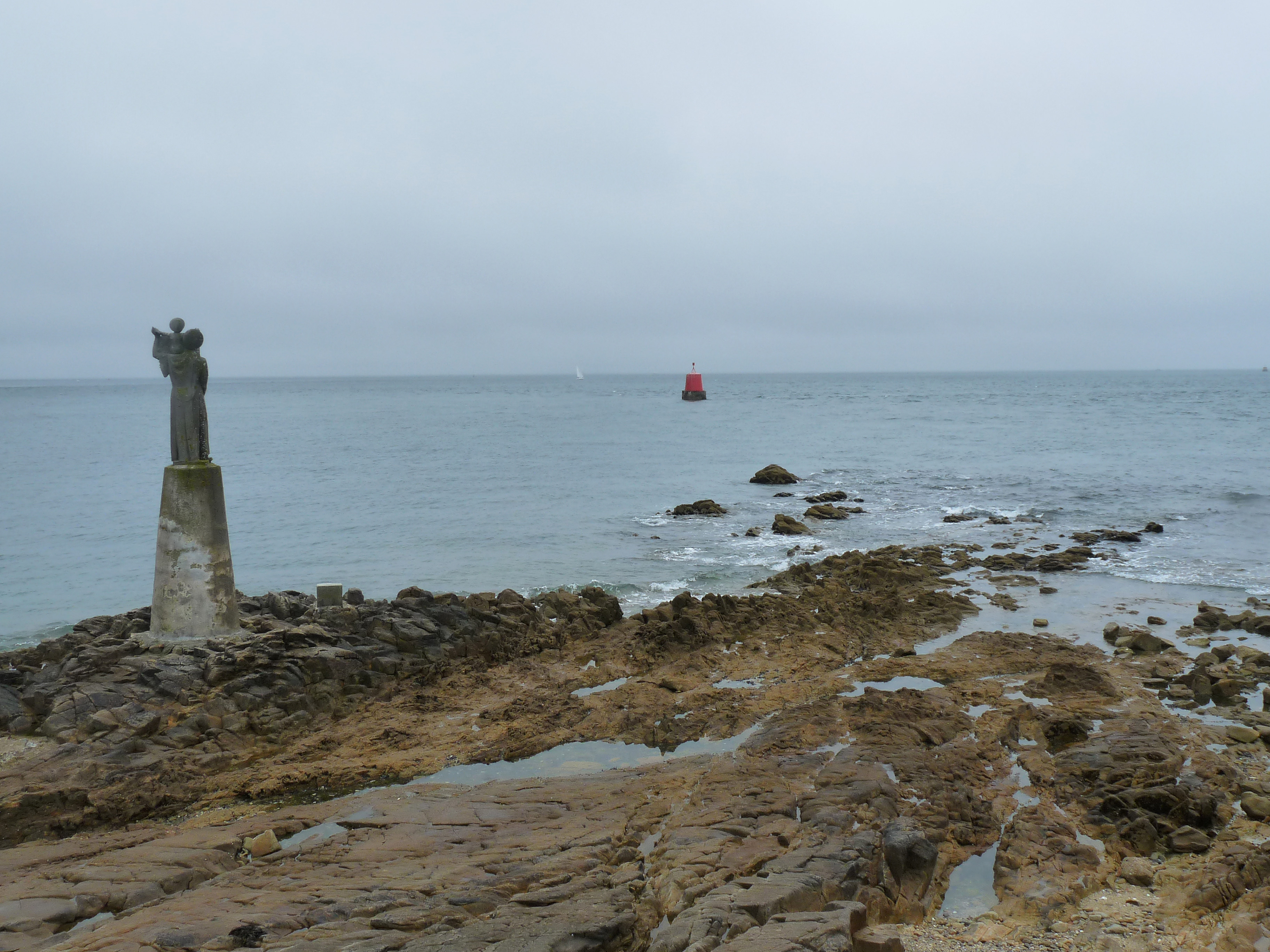
Notre-Dame de Kerdro

Le Bozec created this huge granite sculpture in 1946. It is 2.7 metres high and stands at Locmariaquer at the entrance to the Gulf of Morbihan, the Pointe de Kerpenhir. It stands on a 3 metre high circular pedestal.

The legend of Notre-Dame de Kerdro was important to Breton fisherman. The story was that the Virgin Mary had appeared to a fishing boat at the mouth of the Gulf of Morbihan, warned of an impending storm and urged the boat back to port.

Originally a plaster statue commemorating the legend had been erected on the ramparts of the Kerpenhir fortress but this had been destroyed during the 1939-1945 war when the Germans erected a blockhouse to replace the fortress. After the war a new statue was planned and Le Bozec's maquette was accepted. This maquette had been shown in the Breton pavilion at Paris' exhibition of 1937. Le Bozec created the statue based on the maquette in 1946 and it was placed in the Église Notre-Dame in 1947. In 1962 it was moved to its present position.

== The Koat-Keo chapel ==
This chapel at Coat-Quéau in Scrignac in Finistère dates to 1937 and was designed by the architect James Bouillé. It was built on the initiative of the Abbé Perrot, the founder of Bleun-Brug. Bouillé was the founder of the "Atelier breton d'art chrétien". The chapel is regarded as being an example of an emerging néobreton style and what singles the building out is the largely open porch in which stands an altar. Bouillé invited Le Bozec to carry out any sculptural work involved.

The chapel was an important part of the Breton nationalist movement and it was made a [[Monument historique|monument historique]] in 1997. The old church was in ruins when, in 1925, the commune of Scrignac decided to put them up for sale and only the chapel and calvary had survived. The chapel was then purchased by a Quimper industrialist René Bolloré who had it demolished and the bricks used elsewhere. In 1937, Bouillé had the new chapel built.

The Abbé Jean-Marie Perrot was buried near the chapel after his assassination by the French Resistance in 1943. Le Bozec sculpted the figure of Christ on the Cross in 1942 for the altar placed in the chapel's porch. There is a door in the southern arm of the transept which carries the inscription in Breton:

937 - 1937, gant milvet bloaz adsavidigez Breiz eo bet adsav et ar chapel-man

The chapel also has a monument by Le Bozec dedicated to Jean-Marie Perrot and the sculpture Gisant de femme depicting a woman in Breton dress.

== Église Notre-Dame de Rumengol ==
Le Bozec sculpted one of the Stations of the Cross for this church depicting Jésus devant Pilate. This church is known for the pardon de Rumengol. The phenomena known as the Pardon is peculiar to Brittany and is in effect a pilgrimage to a particular location and on specified dates. The pardon of the diocese of Quimper takes place in Le Faou and its church of Notre-Dame de Rumengol. The Quimper pardon has been held for several hundreds of years only seeing a brief pause at the time of the French revolution. One pardon is known as the grand pardon de la Trinité and by 1901 it was attracting a huge number of pilgrims reckoned to number 30,000 pilgrims and 28 priests.

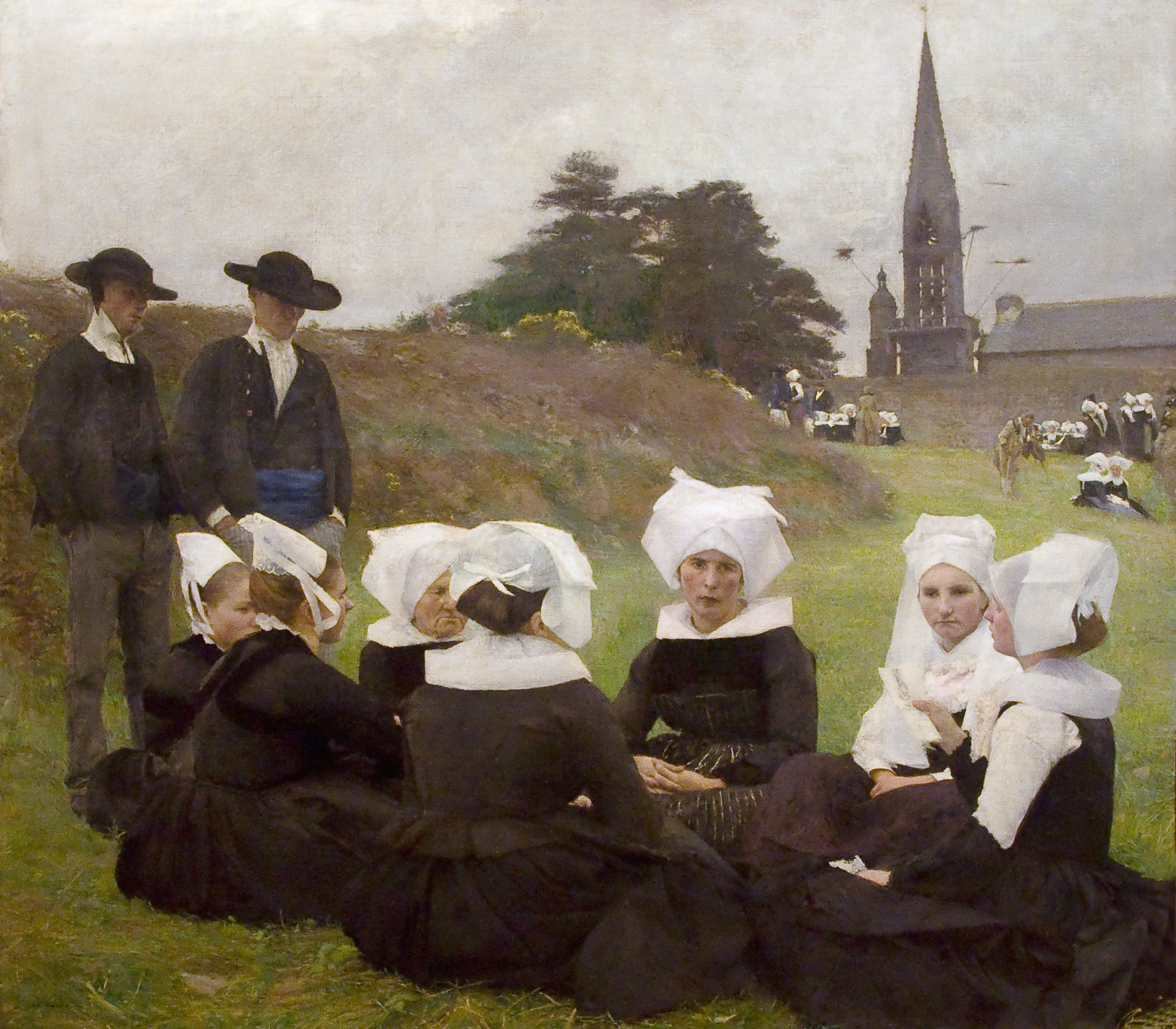
Pascal Dagnan-Bouveret's painting of the "pardon de Rumengol

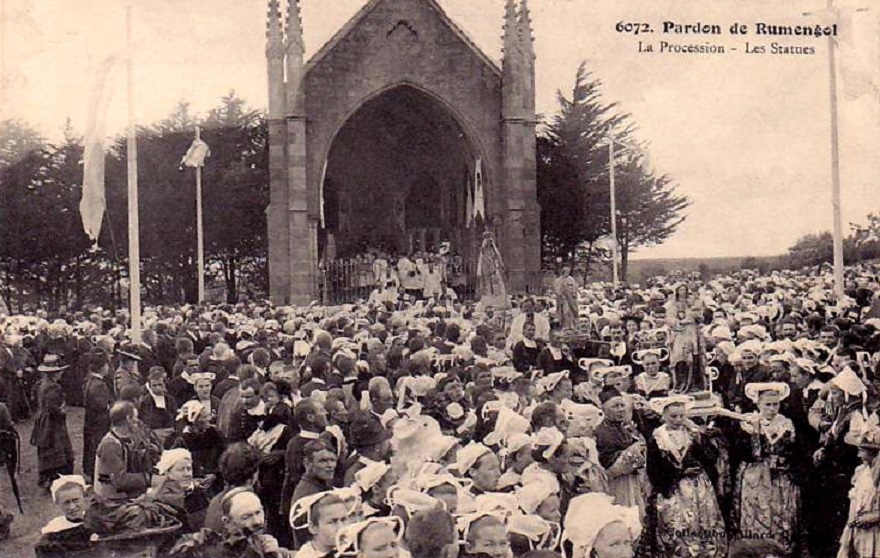
Old postcard showing crowds at the pardon de Rumengol around 1930

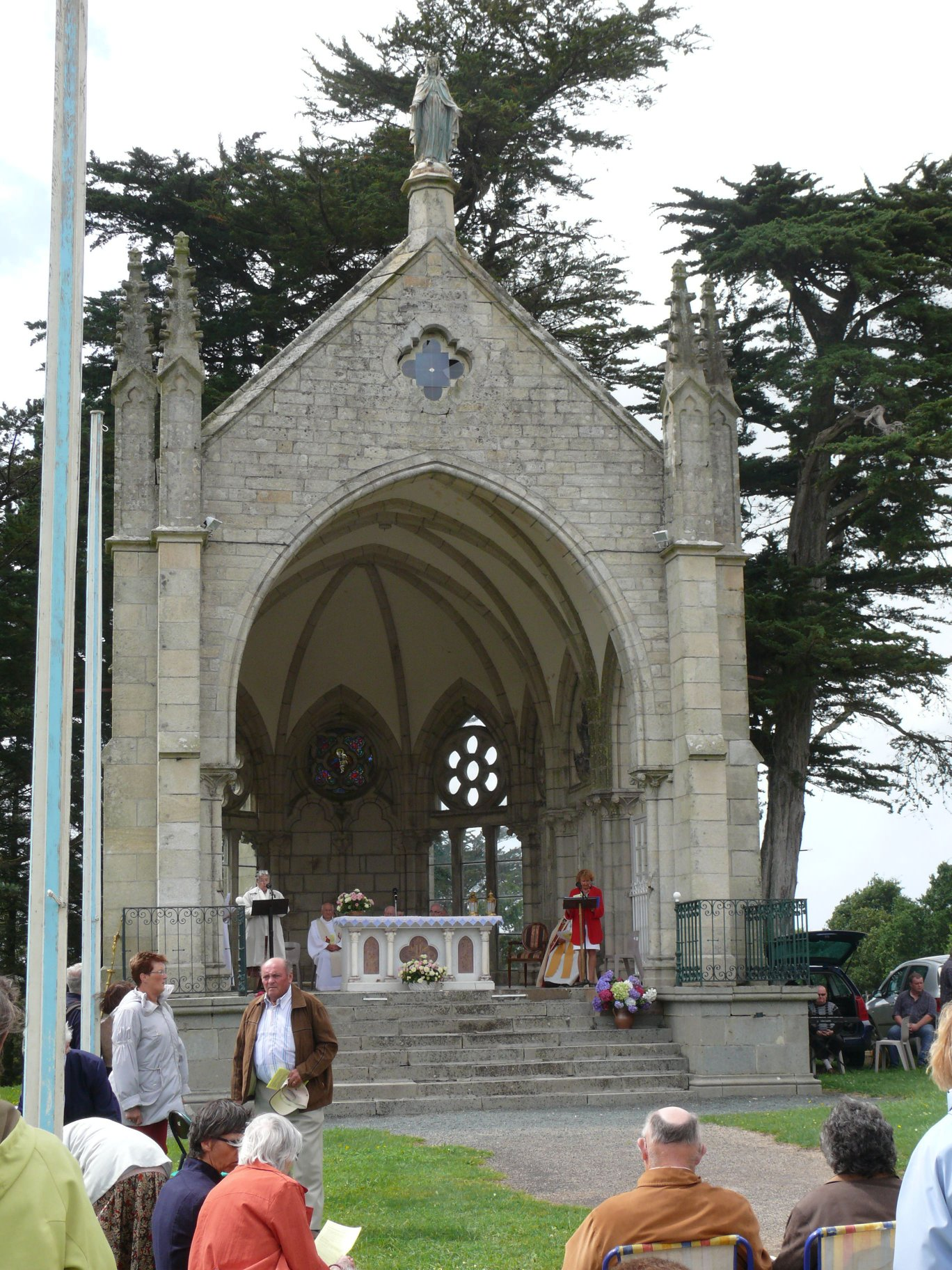
The entrance to the Église Notre-Dame-de-Rumengol

== The parish church of Saint-Georges in Lavancia-Épercy ==
Le Bozec carved a depiction of Christ on the Cross for this church in Jura. The work dates to 1951.

== The Saint Joseph College chapel ==
The architect James Bouillé designed this chapel in Lannion for the Saint-Joseph college in 1936/37 and used artists from "An Troellen"; including Jules-Charles Le Bozec for any sculpture involved, Xavier de Langlais to add some paintings and Paul Rault to create the chapel's stained glass. The chapel was built using reinforced concrete. The sculpture on the church façade of Christ on the Cross is by Le Bozec.

== Note on James Bouillé ==
Bouillé was one of the founders in 1923 of the artistic movement Seiz Breur, along with Jeanne Malivel and René-Yves Creston. Their aim was to revitalise Breton sacred art: crosses, votive objects and traditional crafts. He also designed and supported pottery, ceramics, embroidery and cabinet making. Between 1924 and 1935, he was an architect in Perros-Guirec, where he developed a successful practice building holiday villas.

In 1929 he joined with Xavier de Langlais to found An Droellen, a workshop of Breton Christian art. The duo worked closely together on a number of projects, including the college chapel of St. Joseph in Lannion. The workshop included among its members Mlle Ménard (glazier), Madame Planiol (restoration of priestly vestments) and Jules-Charles Le Bozec.

During World War II, Perrot and Breun-Blug were suspected of collaborationist activity. In 1941, Bouillé was made director of Bleun-Brug and sat on the Advisory Committee of Brittany, as its representative. The Committee was seen by resistance activists as part of the collaborationist régime. At this time he advocated a radical plan to build a new Breton capital city to be called "Brittia", which would be a "Celtic Brasilia" on the shores of Lake Guerlédan. Due to his association with Perrot and the committee, he was interned after the Liberation of France. He died in 1945, as a result of his internment.
