= Zénaïde Fleuriot =

French novelist

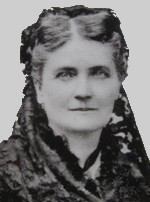
Zénaïde Fleuriot

Zénaïde-Marie-Anne Fleuriot (28 October 1829 – 19 December 1890), was a French novelist. She wrote eighty three novels, all aimed at young women, most of which were published in the series Bibliothèque rose and Bibliothèque bleue. Her writings were initially published under the pseudonym Anna Edianez, Edianez being an anagram of Zénaïde and Anna being derived from one of her own given names, Anne. She also wrote under the names Anna Edianez de Saint-B. and Anna Edianez de L.

== Biography ==
Zénaïde Fleuriot was born in Saint-Brieuc, Brittany to a devoutly Catholic and Royalist family, faithful to the Bourbons. Her parents had sixteen children of which only five survived. Her father, Jean-Marie, having lost his mother as a child, was brought up by his uncle, a priest, who was shot by the Revolutionaries in Brest in 1794 for refusing to sign the Civil Constitution of the Clergy. At the age of fourteen he had fought in the Battle of Austerlitz (1802). Repatriated in 1806, he turned to the study of law, becoming an advocate in Saint-Brieuc. During the July Monarchy he lost his fortune and his job after attacking the régime in the aftermath of the 1830 Revolution. Zénaïde Fleuriot was deeply influenced by the political and religious milieu of her family environment.

Between 1849 and 1860, she worked as governess to the children of the Guillotou family in Kerever, staying in Saint-Brieuc during the winter and in Château-Billy, Ploufragan, during the summer. During this period she produced a significant number of novels, which gave her financial independence.

In 1867, suffering from depression, she contemplated abandoning literature. Her deep Christianity led her to dream of living a sequestered religious life. In Rome, she met Princess Carolyne zu Sayn-Wittgenstein, another Catholic writer, who became her confidante. Wittgenstein convinced her to continue with her literary career. She resumed literary work. In 1871 she founded and later led a vocational school intended to promote youth employment.

In the spring of 1872, Fleuriot visited her deceased brother’s children and their mother at the seaside town of Locmariaquer. She fell in love with this little port, acquiring a large estate in 1873 with a magnificent view over the Gulf of Morbihan. She built a house which she named "Kermoareb" (meaning "My Aunt’s House" in the Breton language). It was here that she wrote one of her best-known novels, Petit chef de famille.

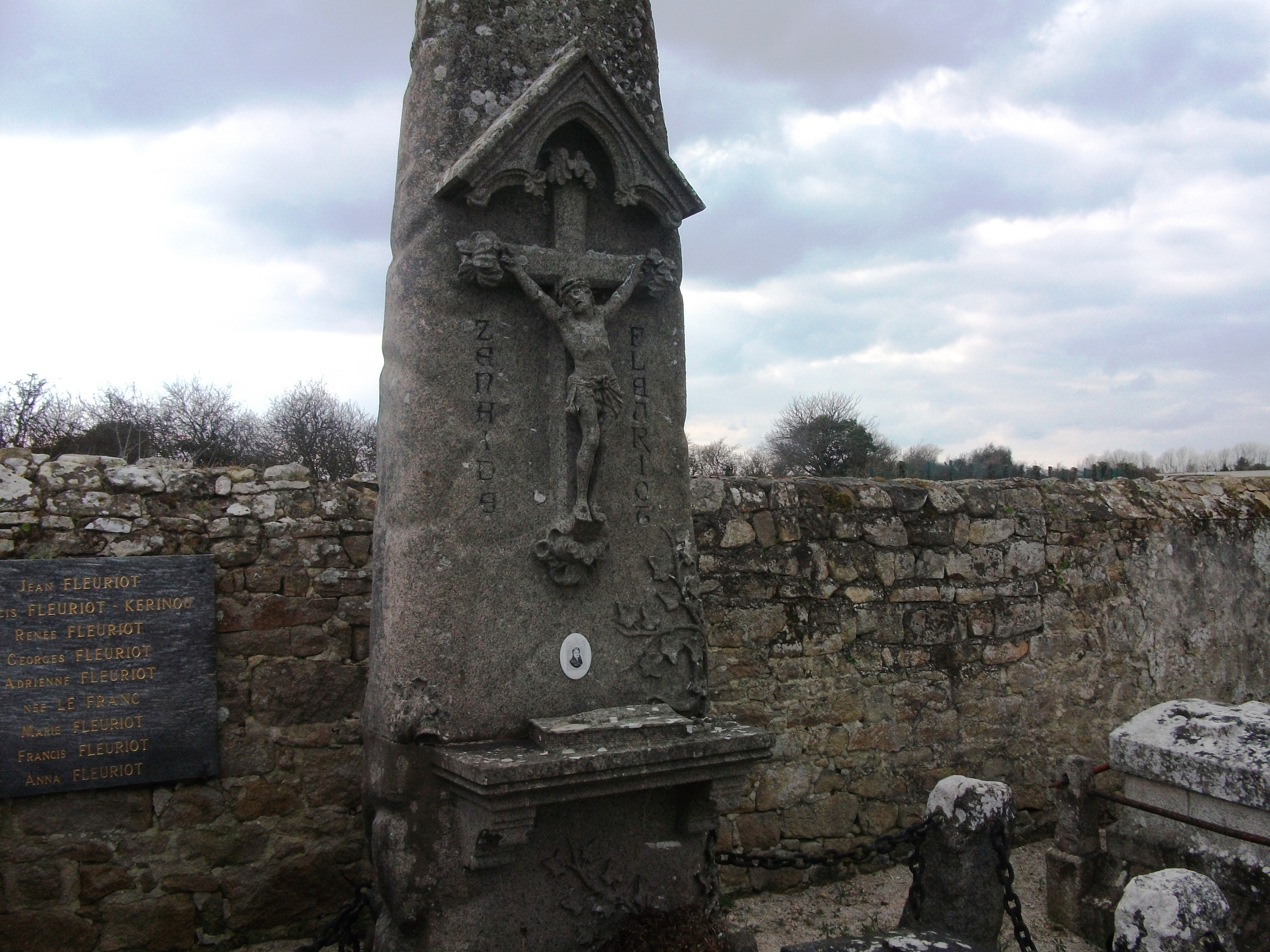
The tomb of Zénaïde Fleuriot in Locmariaquer

After her death in Paris, her body was transported by train from Gare Montparnasse back to Brittany to be buried in the cemetery of Locmariaquer as she had requested. The coffin was carried to the grave by eight local sailors. The grave is in the form of a menhir referring to the famous neolithic site directly behind the graveyard.

== Literary career ==
Fleuriot published a number of essays under the name Anna Edianez, but very soon her early novels were published under the name Zénaïde Fleuriot.

After her early publications she worked for the Journal des demoiselles et la Mode illustrée. Her novel Aigles et colombes (Eagles and Doves) was rewarded by the Académie française with a 1500 Franc prize.

She was a constant contributor to "Le Journal de la jeunesse" and "La Bibliothèque rose", whose aim was to provide young people with unobjectionable reading. Her novels are written in a simple, easy style.

Her background gave her a deep respect for traditional Christian and family values, which infused her work. This helped to make her work very popular among the Catholic middle class.

From 1874 to 1879, she edited the journal la Semaine des familles.

== Novels ==
- 1857 : La Fontaine du moine rouge
- 1859 : Souvenirs d'une douairière (her first popular success)
- 1860 : Marquise et pêcheur
- 1861 : Ève, La Vie en famille, Une famille bretonne
- 1862 : La Fille du serrurier, Sans beauté
- 1863 : Histoire pour tous, Un cœur de mère, Réséda
- 1864 : Au hasard (collected stories), Yvonne de Coatmorvan
- 1865 : Les Prévalonnais
- 1866 : Le Chemin et le but, Une saison au bord de la mer (sequel to Chemin et le but), Sans nom, La clef d'or, La Glorieuse
- 1867 : L'Oncle trésor, Une année de la vie d'une femme, Une chaîne invisible
- 1868 : Petite belle, Alix (in two volumes), Histoire intime
- 1869 : Deux bijoux, Mon sillon
- 1870 : À l'aventure, Ce pauvre vieux, Notre passé
- 1871 : Entre absents, Une parisienne sous la foudre, Siège de Paris
- 1872 : Mes héritages, Marga (the second volume of Ce pauvre vieux), Les mauvais jours: note d'un bourru sur le siège de Paris, Notre capitale Rome
- 1873 : Aller et retour Paris-Paray-le-Monial, Aigles et colombes (winner of a prize from the Académie française), Les pieds d'argile (in two volumes), Théâtre chez soi, Le petit chef de famille
- 1874 : En congé, Armelle Trahec, Plus Tard ou le jeune chef de famille (the second part of Petit Chef de famille), Bigarette
- 1875 : Monsieur Nostradamus
- 1876 : La Petite Duchesse
- 1877 : Un fruit sec, Un enfant gâté, Miss idéal
- 1878 : Les aventures d'un rural (in two volumes), Raoul Daubry (the third part of Petit chef), Grand cœur
- 1880 : Bonasse, La rustaude, Mandarine, Tranquille et Tourbillon
- 1881 : Tombée du nid (the second part of Mandarine), Alberte (the second part of Petite Duchesse), Charybde et Scylla, Cadette
- 1882: Bouche en cœur, Gildas l'intraitable, Faraude, Cadok
- 1883 : Caline, L'héritier de Kerguignon (the second part of Cadok), Sous le joug (the second part of Gildas l'intraitable)
- 1884 : Désertion
- 1885 : Ces bons Rosaëc (the second part of Désertion), Feu et flamme
- 1887 : Le Clan des têtes chaudes, Au Galadoc (the second part of Clan des têtes chaudes), Le cœur et le tête (the second part of Tranquille et Tourbillon)
- 1888 : De trop, L'exilée du Val Argand (the second part of Le cœur et la tête), Parisiens et montagnards
- 1889 : Les Premières pages, Cœur muet, Loyauté
- 1890 : Bengale (the second part of Galadoc)

Posthumous publications :

- 1891 : Rayon de soleil
- 1892 : Papillonne
- 1897 : Mon dernier livre
