= Jules-Charles Le Bozec =

French sculptor

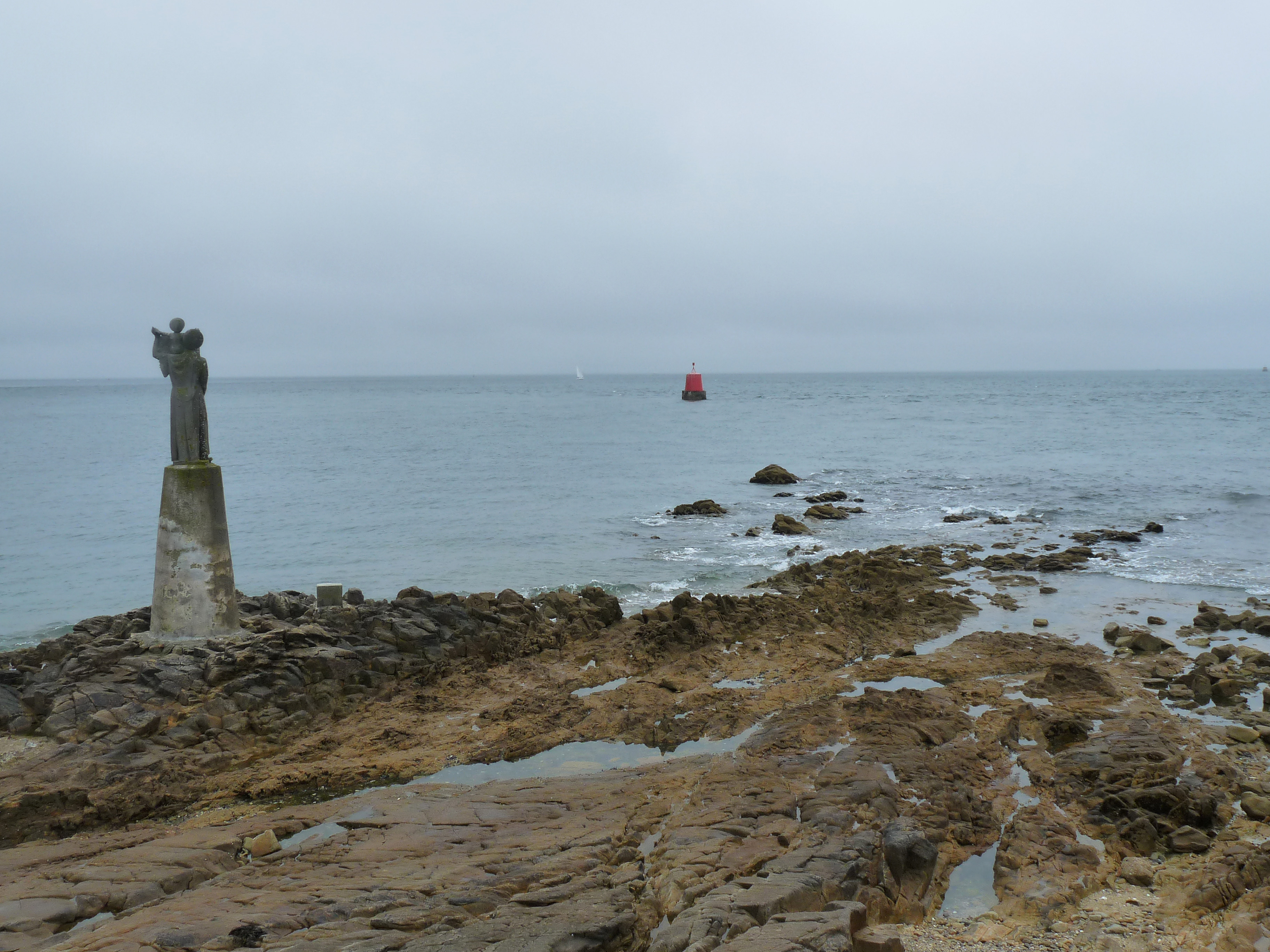
Pointe de Kerpenhir-Morbihan

Jules-Charles Le Bozec (1898–1973) was a French sculptor, whose work reflects a commitment to the local design traditions of his native province of Brittany.

== Biography ==
Le Bozec was born in Saint-Mayeux, Côtes-d'Armor, Brittany. He was apprenticed to the carpenter Alfred Ély-Monbet, of the nearby village of Caurel. He then moved on to study at the École des Beaux-Arts of Rennes, before progressing to that of Paris. He was a pupil of the sculptor Jean Boucher, for whom he always retained a profound respect mingled with affection.

Le Bozec settled in Mellionnec. With Marcel Le Louët, Georges Robin and others he joined the Breton art movement Seiz Breur, a group of young artists who were dedicated to the revival of decorative arts in Brittany. With James Bouillé and Xavier de Langlais, he also helped to found An Droellen, the Breton studio of Christian Art.

In 1927, in collaboration with the painter René-Yves Creston, he designed the costumes for three plays: Ar C'hornandoned, by Yann Bayon and Jean-Marie Perrot, Tog Jani by Yves Le Moal and Lina by Roparz Hemon, the first performance of which took place in January 1927.

Soon becoming well known, he received many commissions from churches and chapels in Brittany, including bas-reliefs for altars, as well as war memorials, which were built in large numbers at this period after World War I.

Some of Le Bozec's sculptures were reproduced by the ceramics company Faïencerie HB-Henriot in Quimper, whose activities date back to 1690. Among these were "Woman Digging" (1930) which is a reduced version of the sculpture Earth, which had been exhibited at the Salon in 1927. Another was "Meditation", showing the bust from Le Bozec's original work, The Potato Harvester. This latter work was reissued in 2007 from the original moulds and is included in the new catalogue of the pottery in its collection of "Quimper White" ware. At an auction in the Drouot hotel in Paris, another of his works - Young Girl with an Umbrella - reproduced by the Faïencerie HB-Henriot reached the sum of 3100 euros.

In 1937, he made sculptures for the Chapel of Koat-Keo in Scrignac (Finistère), built by his friend James Bouillé at the initiative of Abbot Perrot, founder of the Breton Catholic youth organization Bleun-Brug. The chapel is seen as a significant attempt to create a distinctive modern Breton architecture.

In 1946, he created the granite statue of Our Lady of Kerdro in Locmariaquer. 2.70 metres high, the sculpture was left for sixteen years in the church before being moved to the edge of Kerpenhir to replace another statue that had been erected in 1883, but had been destroyed during World War II.

He died at Mellionnec, Côtes-d'Armor.

== See also ==
- List of works by Jules-Charles Le Bozec
