= Locmariaquer =

Commune in Brittany, France

Locmariaquer Lokmaria-Kaer
- Commune
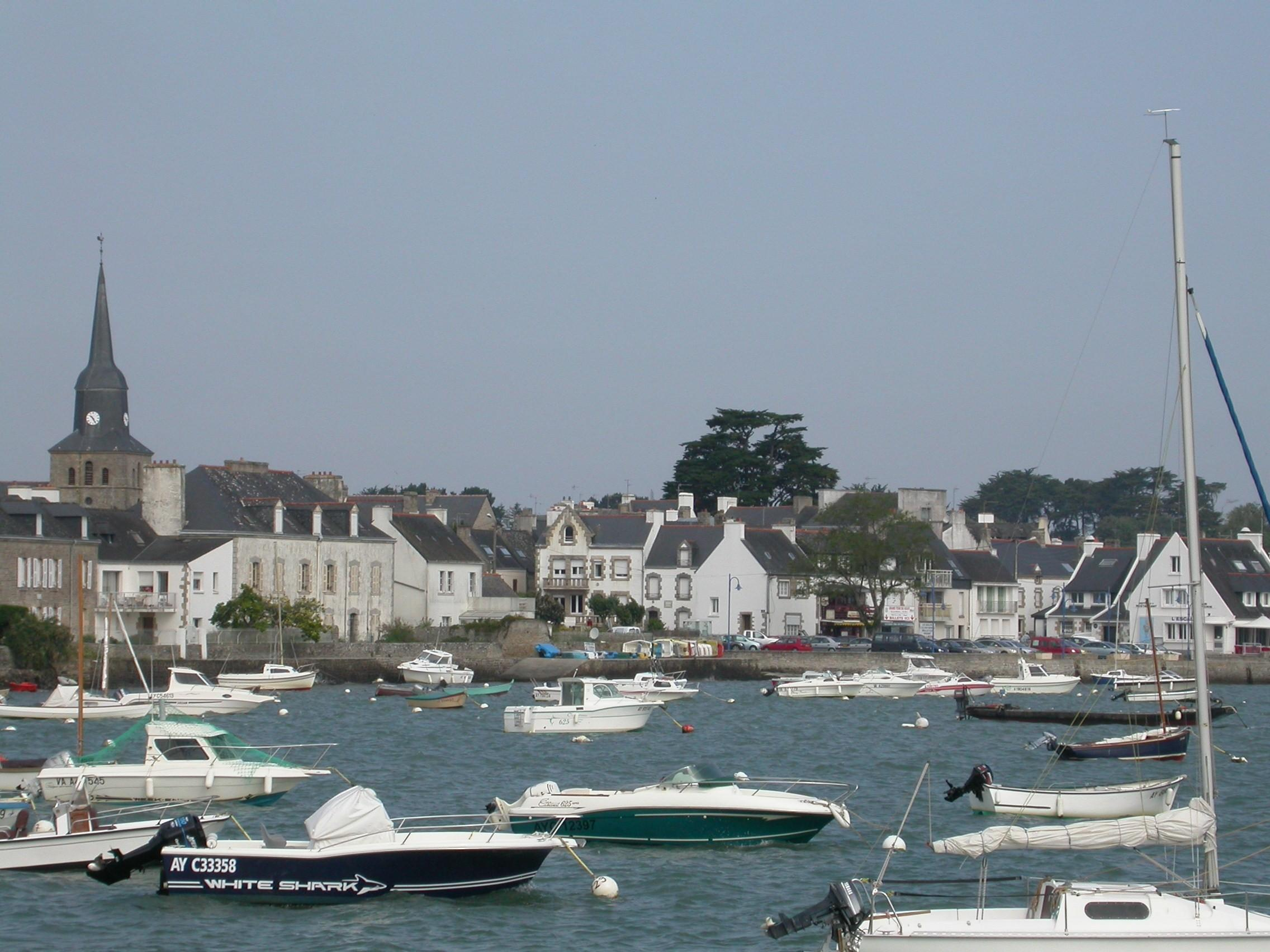
- General view of the harbour

- Coat of arms
- Location of Locmariaquer
- Location within France Location within Brittany
- Coordinates: 47°34′12″N 2°56′39″W
- Country: France
- Region: Brittany
- Department: Morbihan
- Arrondissement: Lorient
- Canton: Auray
- Intercommunality: Auray Quiberon Terre Atlantique

Government
  - Mayor (2026–32): Hervé Cagnard
- Area^{1}: 10.99 km^{2} (4.24 sq mi)
- Elevation: 16 m (52 ft)
- Highest elevation: 19 m (62 ft)
- Lowest elevation: 0 m (0 ft)
- Population (2023): 1,577
  - Density: 143.5/km^{2} (371.6/sq mi)
- Time zone: UTC+01:00 (CET)
  - Summer (DST): UTC+02:00 (CEST)
- INSEE/Postal code: 56116 /56740
- ^{1} French Land Register data, which excludes lakes, ponds, glaciers > 1 km^{2} (0.386 sq mi or 247 acres) and river estuaries.

Locmariaquer (French pronunciation: [lɔkmaʁjakɛʁ]; Breton: Lokmaria-Kaer) is a commune in the Morbihan department in Brittany in north-western France. As of 2023, the population of the commune was 1,577.

It lies 8.5 mi (13.7 km) south of Auray by road.

== Coat of arms ==
Coat of arms of Locmariaquer

This coat of arms was created 30 years ago by the local artist Jean-Baptiste Corlobé. The arms portray:

- upper portion of shield: a silver dolmen on a sinople field
- central band: ermine banner, recalling that Locmariaquer is at the heart of Brittany.
- lower band: and a gold sailboat on blue field

All are surmounted by a baronial crown (Locmariaquer was part of the former barony of Kaër). It bears the Breton language motto: "Kaër e mem bro" which can be interpreted in two ways: "Kaër is my country" or "my country is beautiful" (the phrase originated with JM François Jacob in 1933).

== Toponymy ==
From the Breton loc which means hermitage (cf.: Locminé), Maria and kaer which means nice or more likely from the Old Breton caer (Modern Breton, ker) which means fortified place, city.

== History and culture ==
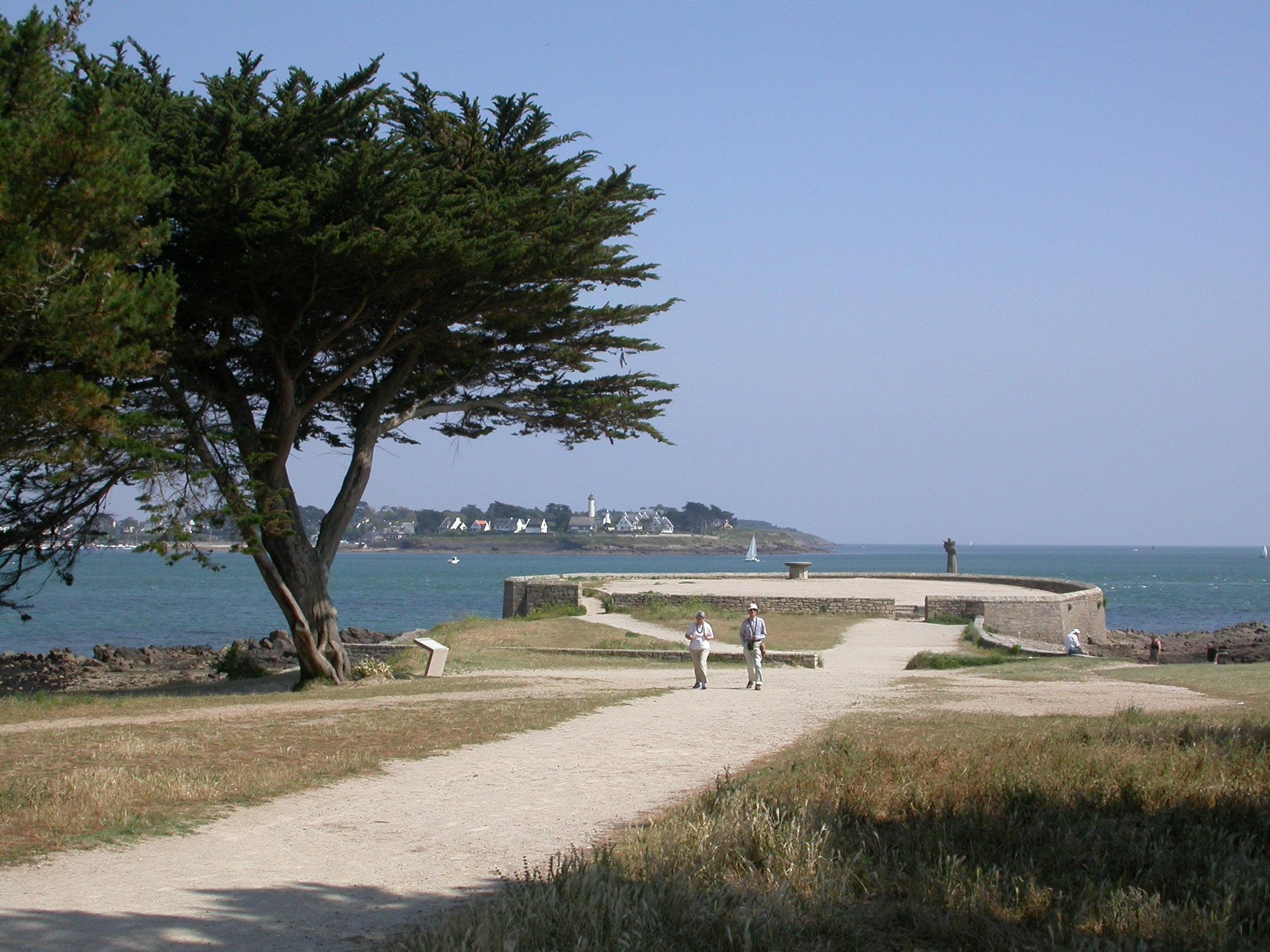
Pointe de Kerpenhir, Locmariaquer

The municipality of Locmariaquer is located at the western tip of the Gulf of Morbihan in Brittany and has many beaches facing the Atlantic Ocean and the bay Quiberon.

This small town contains the Locmariaquer megaliths (also called the Grand Menhir Brisé, meaning "Great Broken Standing Stone" in the Breton language. These are some of the most significant neolithic remains in Europe, dating back to 4,500 BCE. The stones include the Broken Menhir of Er Grah, which is the largest known single block of stone to have been transported and erected by Neolithic man, and the Table des Marchands, a dolmen with notable carvings.

In the 19th century, it became the home of the writer Zénaïde Fleuriot, who idealised it in her novels.

A large statue of the Madonna and child was built at Pointe de Kerperhir to commemorate a miracle in which the Madonna is said to have warned sailors of a forthcoming storm by appearing at the spot. The statue was destroyed in World War II, but replaced by a new work by Jules-Charles Le Bozec after the war.

== Breton language ==
The municipality launched a linguistic plan through Ya d'ar brezhoneg on 26 November 2008.

In 2011, the municipality was award the "Ya d'ar Brezhoneg" (Yes to the Breton Language) label, level 2 by the Public Office of the Breton Language. The local government installed bilingual street signs, letterheads, exterior signage on municipal buildings, a town hall logo, and a recorded message for the town hall’s telephone system. Breton language courses for adults have been promoted in newsletter articles and on posters.

== Economy ==
Locmariaquer has a small port, but is one of the most important oyster producing areas in the world, due to its production of the finest and possibly the rarest oyster types.

=== History of oyster farming ===
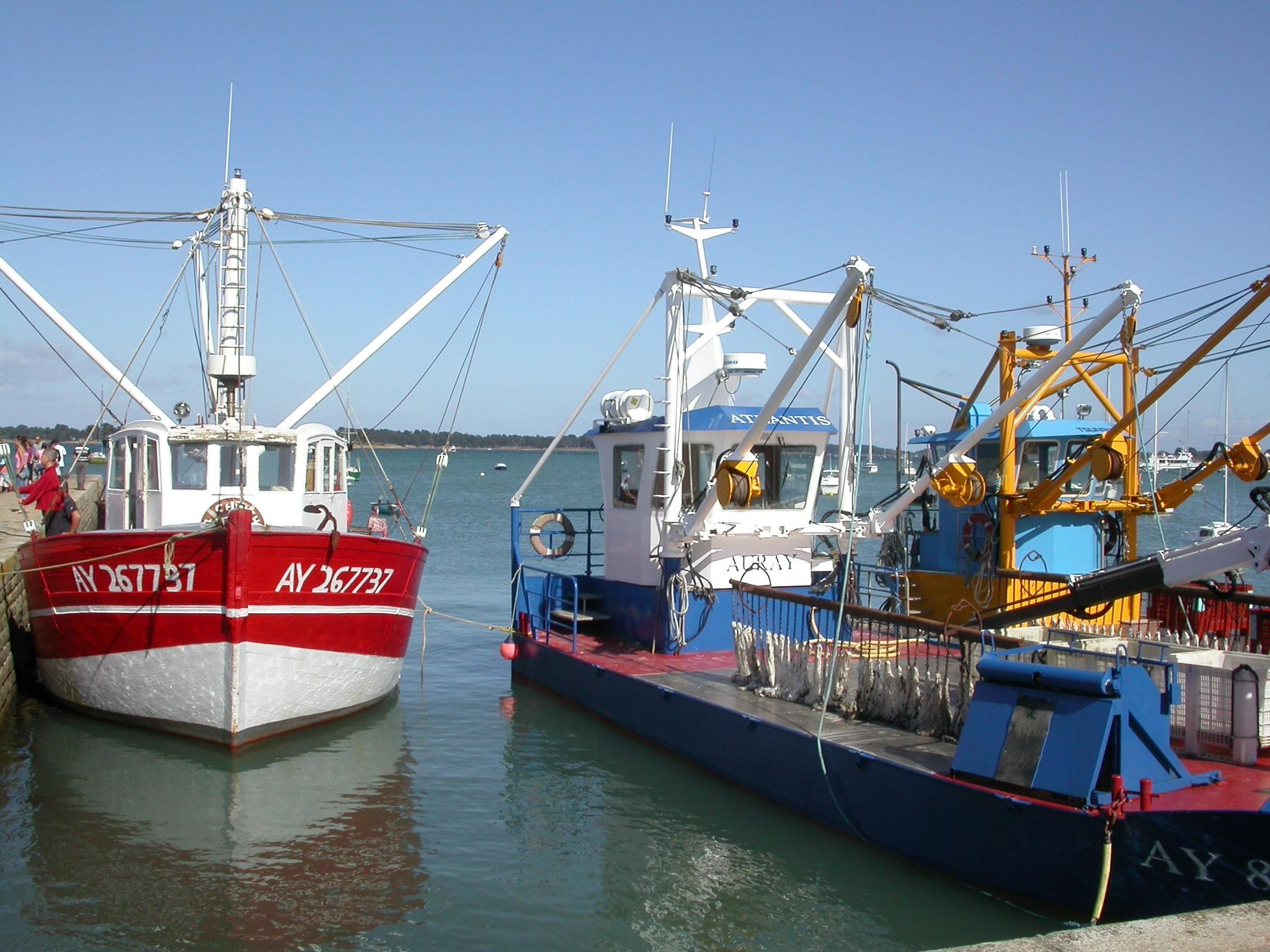
View of the port feast of oysters

The ancient Romans knew of the existence of deposits of natural edible oysters (or flat oyster) (Ostrea edulis, Linn.), but it was not until the late 19th century that oyster farming started. The municipality of Locmariaquer was then regarded as the cradle of the edible oyster. The first concessions in the Auray River were issued in 1882.

Three generations devoted themselves to building oyster parks on the shores of Locmariaquer: they had to remove the mud, replace it with sand, and map out the locations.

Their job was to collect the spat (oyster larvae) clime coat the tiles or stakes and to take off or (détroquage) the growing areas and then sow the young oysters in parks for breeding for a duration of three years, during which there was a need to protect oysters against predators, algae, toxins, and storms.

After 1927, Locmariaquer specialized mainly in the reproduction and the half-rearing of the oysters. After growing them to half size they were shipped off to Marennes, Holland, England, and Spain. The oyster industry grew to be very prosperous: 350 to 400 people worked in the construction of sites and parks almost all year round. However, in 1973–1974, flat oysters in the Gulf of Morbihan were decimated or destroyed by parasites. They were then replaced by cultivated oysters of Japanese origin, Crassostrea gigas.

Today, Locmariaquérois oyster farmers are cultivating Pacific oysters in the Gulf and River St Philibert. The crop and livestocks of the flat oyster are mainly in the Bay of Quiberon. Despite mechanization tests, the need of manpower is still high, both in culture itself and the pre-marketing operations (refining, sizing, etc.).

As of 2008, thirty oyster farms still existed around Locmariaquer. They occupied about fifty people full-time, as well as seasonal workers in October to May. Sales to wholesalers, retailers or directly to consumers were handled individually by the farms. A careful observer might find a few vendors selling the old original Plattes oysters.

In more recent times the town has become one of the most important oyster fisheries in France. It is known for its giant Belon oysters.

== Gallery ==
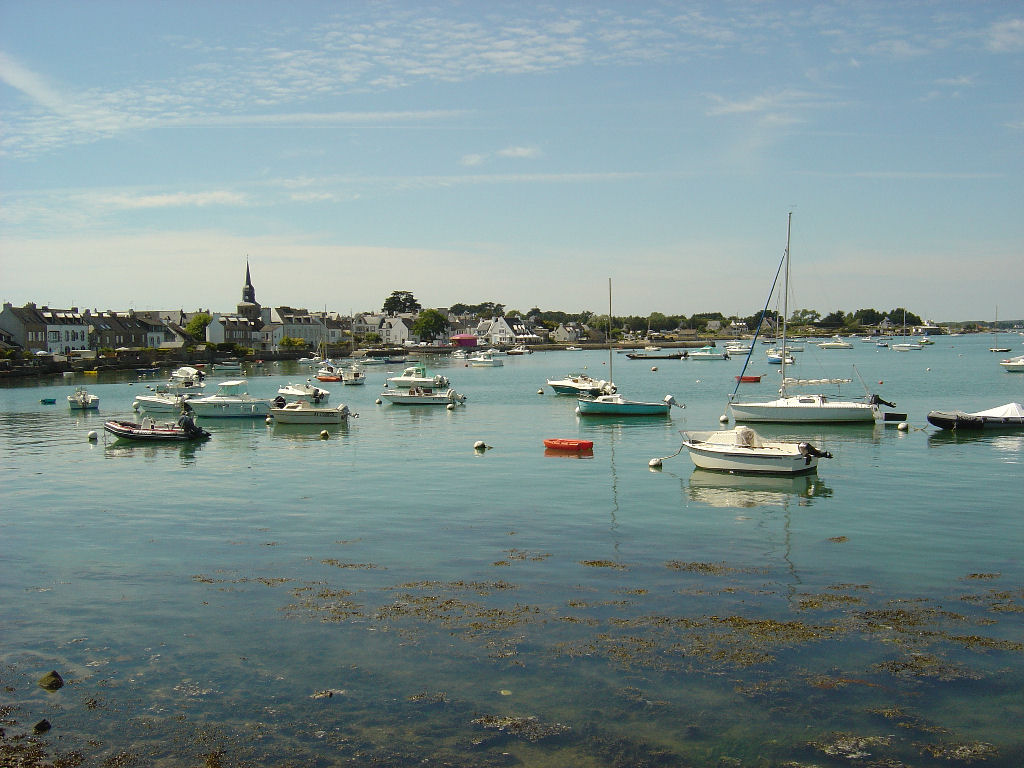
Overview of the Port

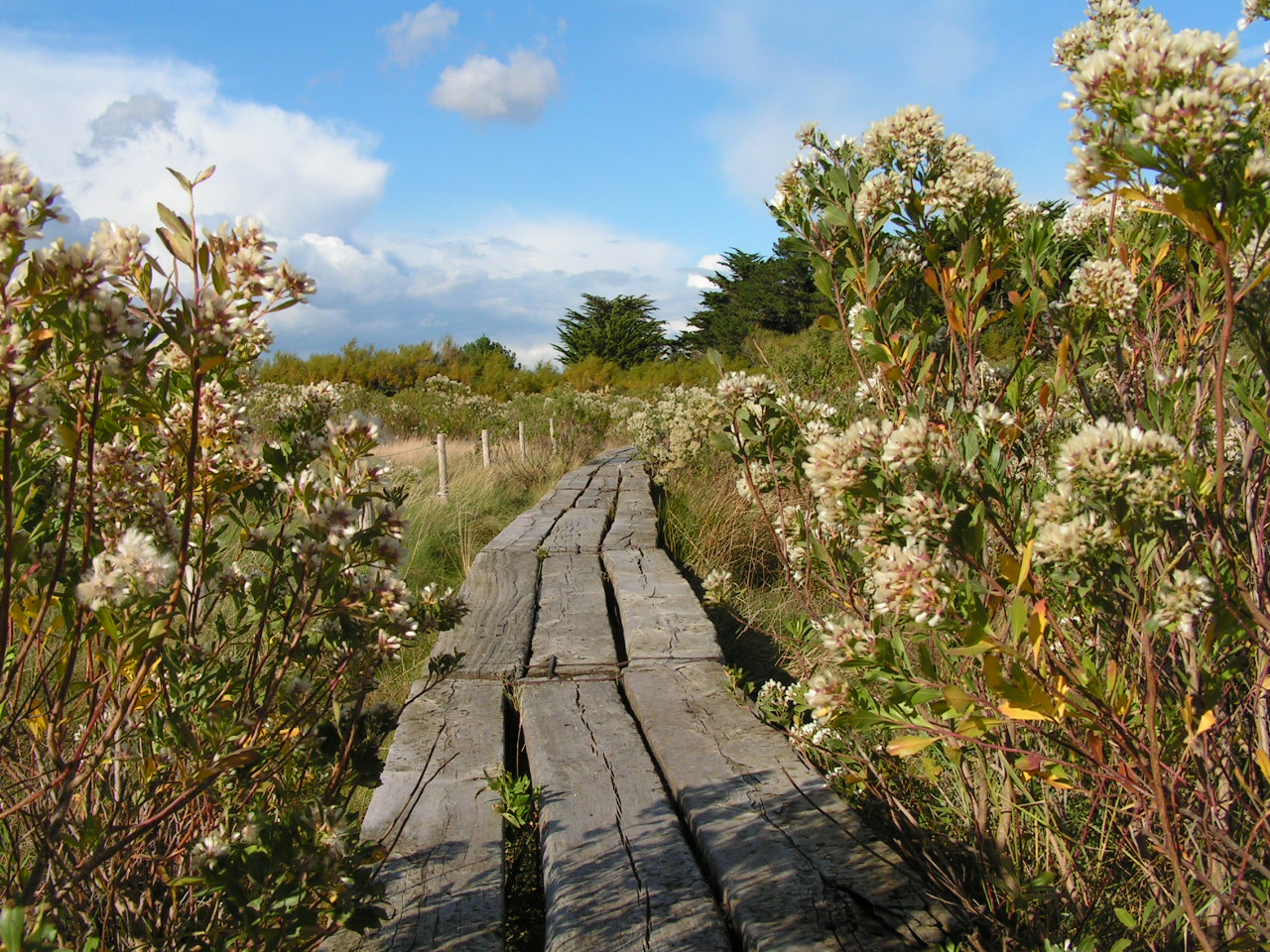
Gateway through the "le Brénéguy" marshes.

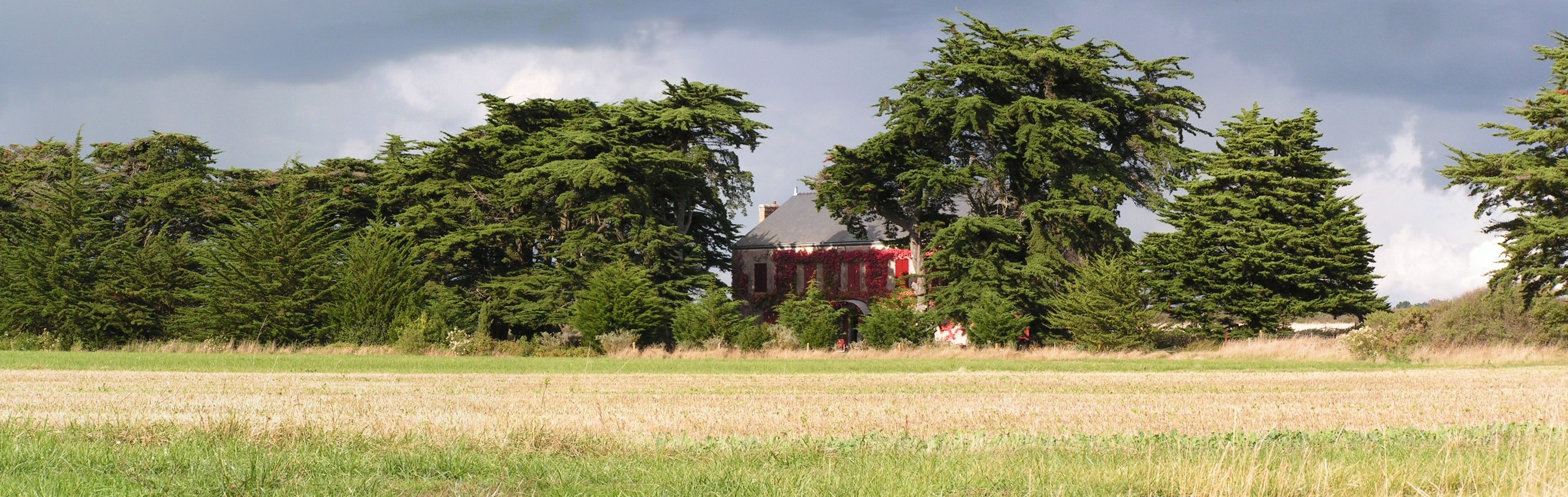
The pink house called "le Brénéguy"

== Religious heritage ==
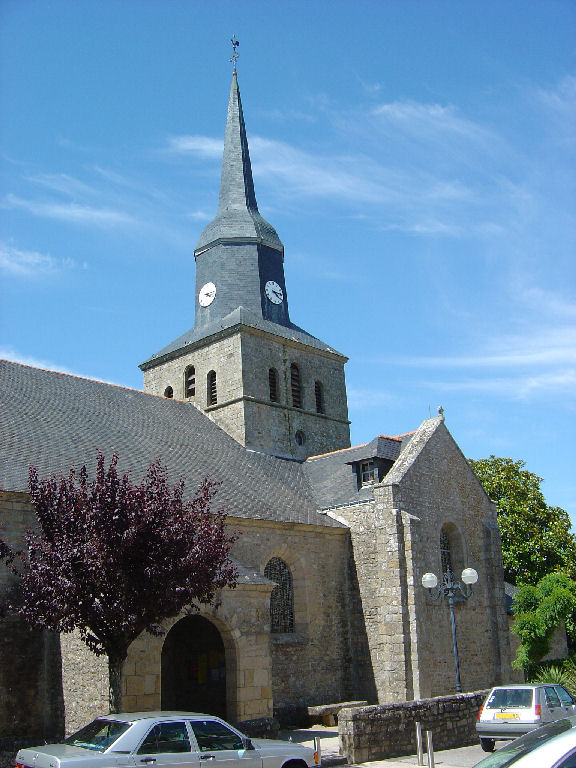
Church "Notre Dame de Kerdro"

==== Notre Dame de Kerdro ====
Of romanesque style, this church was built between 1082 and 1120 by the monks of Quimperlé. Today, only the transept and the choir of the original building remain. On the exterior one can read the inscription Hic Domus Dei (Here is the house of God). This section presents external walls of an archaic stonework (intercalation of Roman cubic stone, bricks and scattered bricks of Roman origin).

The south gate is protected by an advanced porch whose wooden ceiling was removed in 1988, showing a cartouche bearing the words Haec Porta Coelli (Here is the door of heaven). Near the southern entrance, in the wall is included a superb granite baptismal font, decorated with leaves and grapes, going back to the 16th century.

Inside the church are its surviving Romanesque features. The transept and apse were included in supplementary inventory of Monument historique by decree of 24 April 1925.

In 1960, The twelve windows were equipped with modern stained glass, created by the firm of Rault, glassmaker in Rennes. The motifs of the seven windows of the nave and transept are abstract, the five windows of the choir presenting figurative images:

- boat and fish (fishing),
- wheat (agriculture),
- the acronym NDK (for Notre Dame de Kerdro)
- bunch of tiles (oyster farming)
- dolmen and menhirs (megaliths)

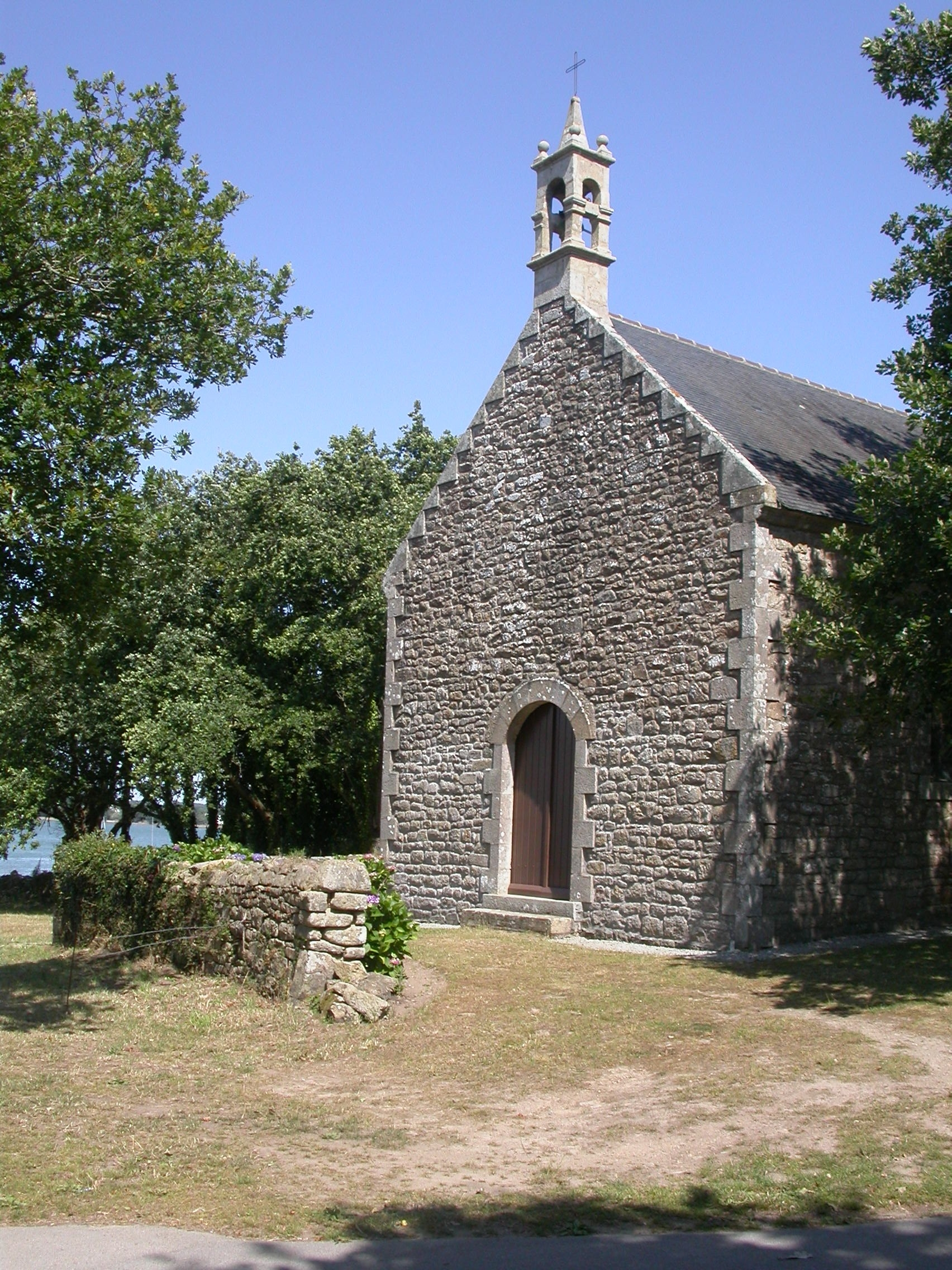
chapelle du Moustoir

==== Chapelle du Moustoir ====
Rebuilt in 1883, the chapel is dedicated to Saint Gildas, but also to Father Claude Philippe, a non-juring priest, who died in 1796 and was buried in this place. The chapel is located north of the town; it was fully restored in recent years by an association that continues to ensure its maintenance. Each year, on the last Sunday of June, a Pardon and a Fest Noz are organized.

==== Chapelle Saint-Pierre-Loperec ====
Built in 1772, this chapel was built to celebrate Mass and organize a Pardon for the survivors of shipwrecks, of which there were many at the time. It can be visited in summer and during the traditional annual Pardon on the first Sunday of July.

==== Chapelle Saint-Michel ====
The chapel was built in 1749 by Christophe Paul De Robien, Baron de Kaër who previously acquired the former chapel built on Gallo-Roman ruins. When the foundations of the present chapel were built, a quantity of medallions bearing the effigy of Caesar and other motifs were found.

Today, the chapel looks like a rectangular building 14 metres long and 7 meters wide. On its portal is a decoration depicting three lily flowers in relief and a stone bearing the date 1813 and a damaged patch representing the arms of Robien.

During the summer months of July and August "friends of the chapel" association has chosen to use the chapel for exhibitions of contemporary art, at the same time highlighting the work of restoration carried out in 1986.

==== Statue of the Virgin Notre-Dame de Kerdro ====
Built on the rocks at the edge of Kerpenhir in 1962: 2.70 m high, it was carved in granite by Jules-Charles Le Bozec in 1946 but spent 16 years in the church before being moved to its present location. It replaces a statue erected in 1883 and destroyed by the Germans along with the fort during World War II.

==== Civil heritage ====
Land of legends and mysteries, Locmariaquer is home to a remarkable concentration of megaliths. Just like nearby Carnac, the city holds unique and rare monuments dating from the Neolithic period. Here men have left a legacy of prestigious burial structures prefiguring the era of the great pyramids. The Great Menhir of Er Grah, the Table of Merchants, the mounds of Er Grah and many other monuments decorate the landscape of Locmariaquer.

== Villages and landmarks ==
- Bellevue
- Coët Courzo
- Coët Er Roué
- Fetanstirec
- Keranlay
- Kercadoret
- Kerdaniel
- Keréré
- Kergolvan
- Kerguerec
- Kerhelle
- Kerhern
- Kerhuiltan
- Keriaval
- Kerigan
- Kerinis
- Kerivaud
- Kerjean
- Kerlavarec
- Kerlogonan
- Kerlud
- Kerouarch
- Kerpenhir
- Kerveresse
- Lann Brick
- Lann Y Nis
- Le Brénéguy
- Le Guilvin
- Le Lézard
- Le Moustoir
- Le Nélud
- Le Palud
- Le Pont Er Lenn
- Le Vinglé
- Les Pierres Plates
- Locquidy
- Mané-Lud
- Pointe de Kerpenhir
- Pointe Er Hourel
- Pointe Erlong
- Pointe Er Ville
- Pont Er Vugale
- Rouick
- Saint-Pierre Loperet
- Scarpoche and Toul Y Niss

=== Megaliths ===
- Broken Menhir of Er Grah, the largest menhir in the world, at nearly 20m, is currently broken into 4 pieces.
- Cairn from la Table des Marchand
- Tumulus d'Er Grah
- Les Pierres Plates (the flat stones)
- House and mounds of Mané Retual
- Dolmen Kercadoret
- Dolmen Kerveresse
- Dolmen Mané Lud
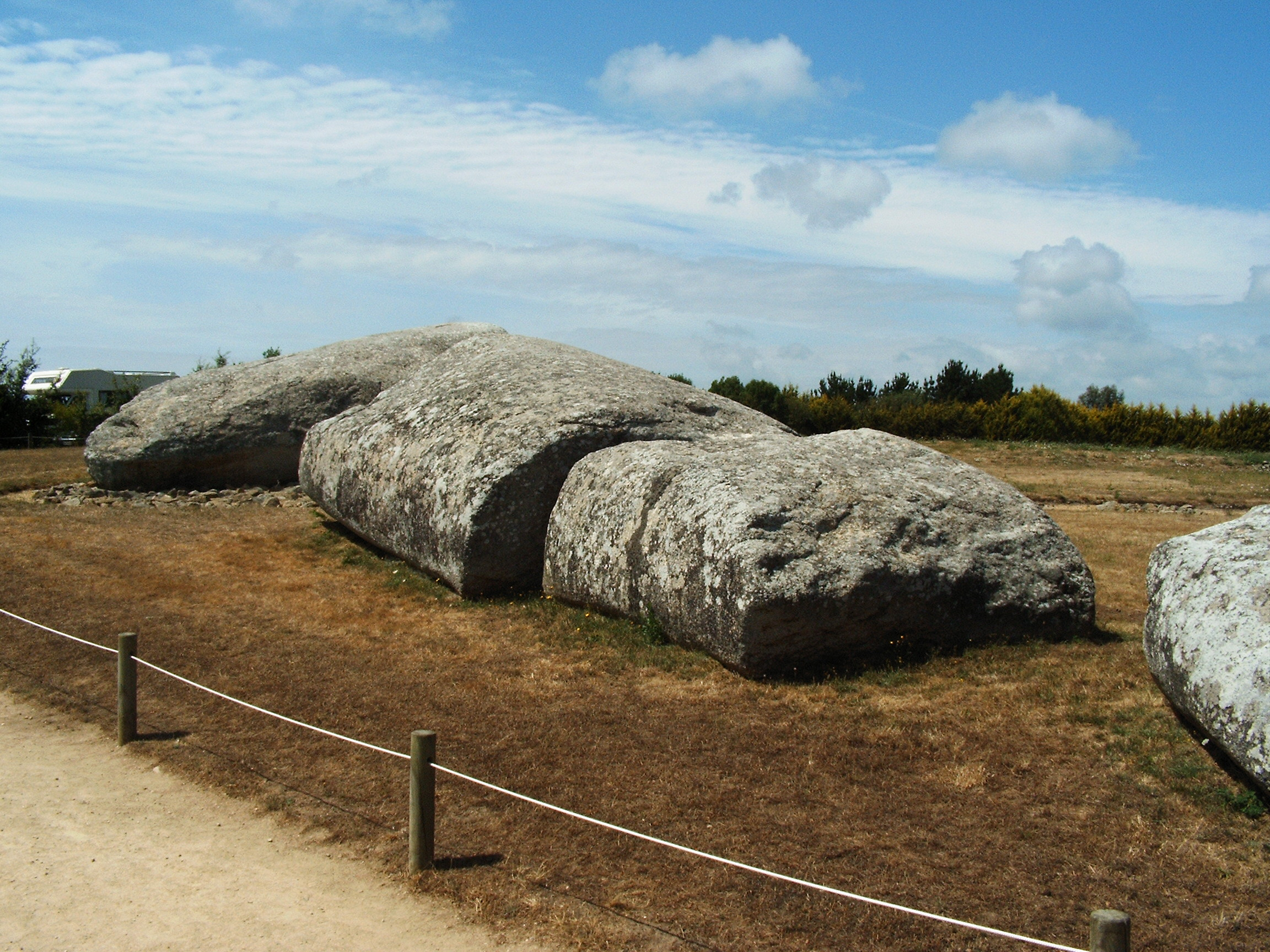
Grand Menhir

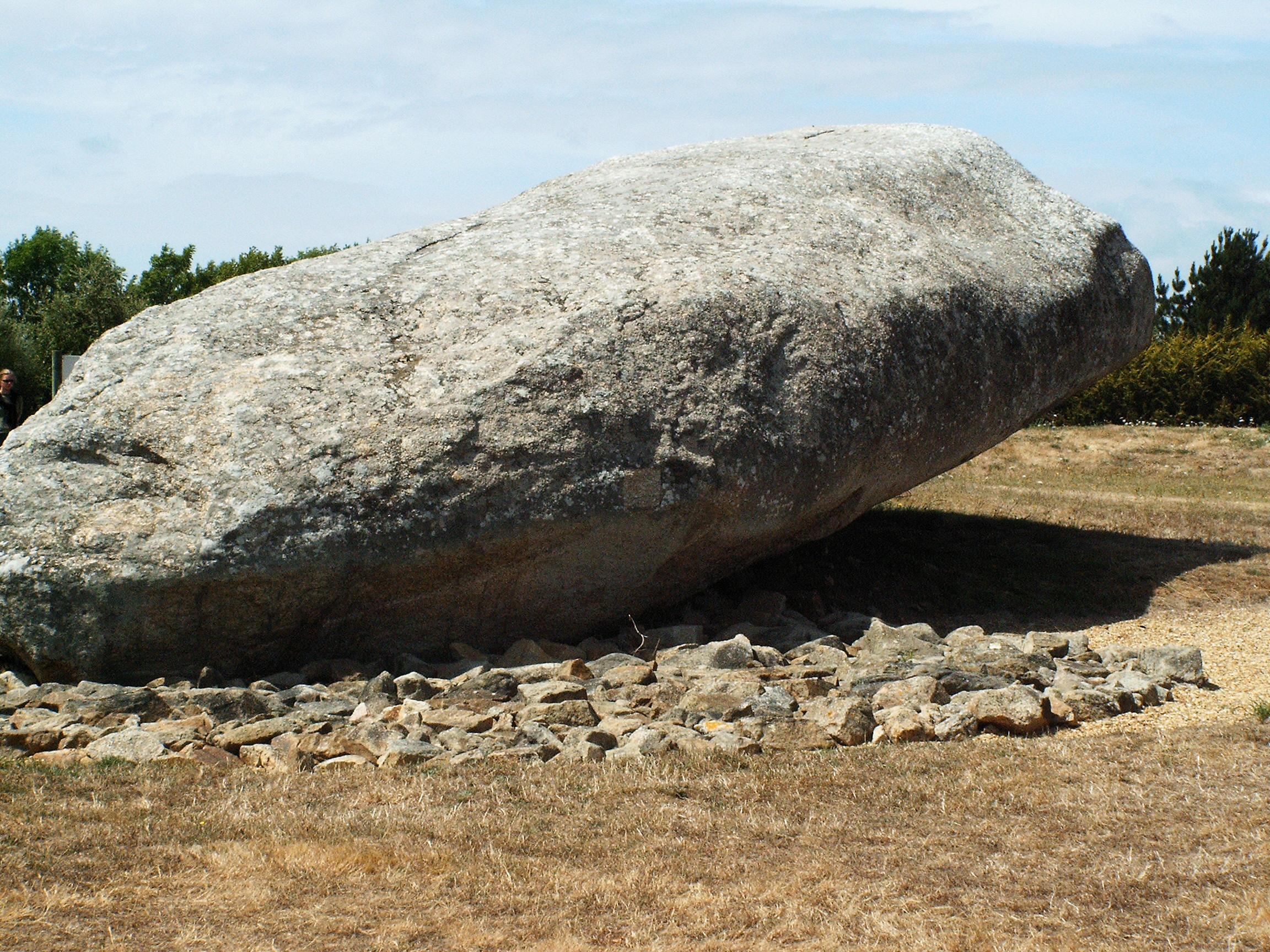
Grand Menhir

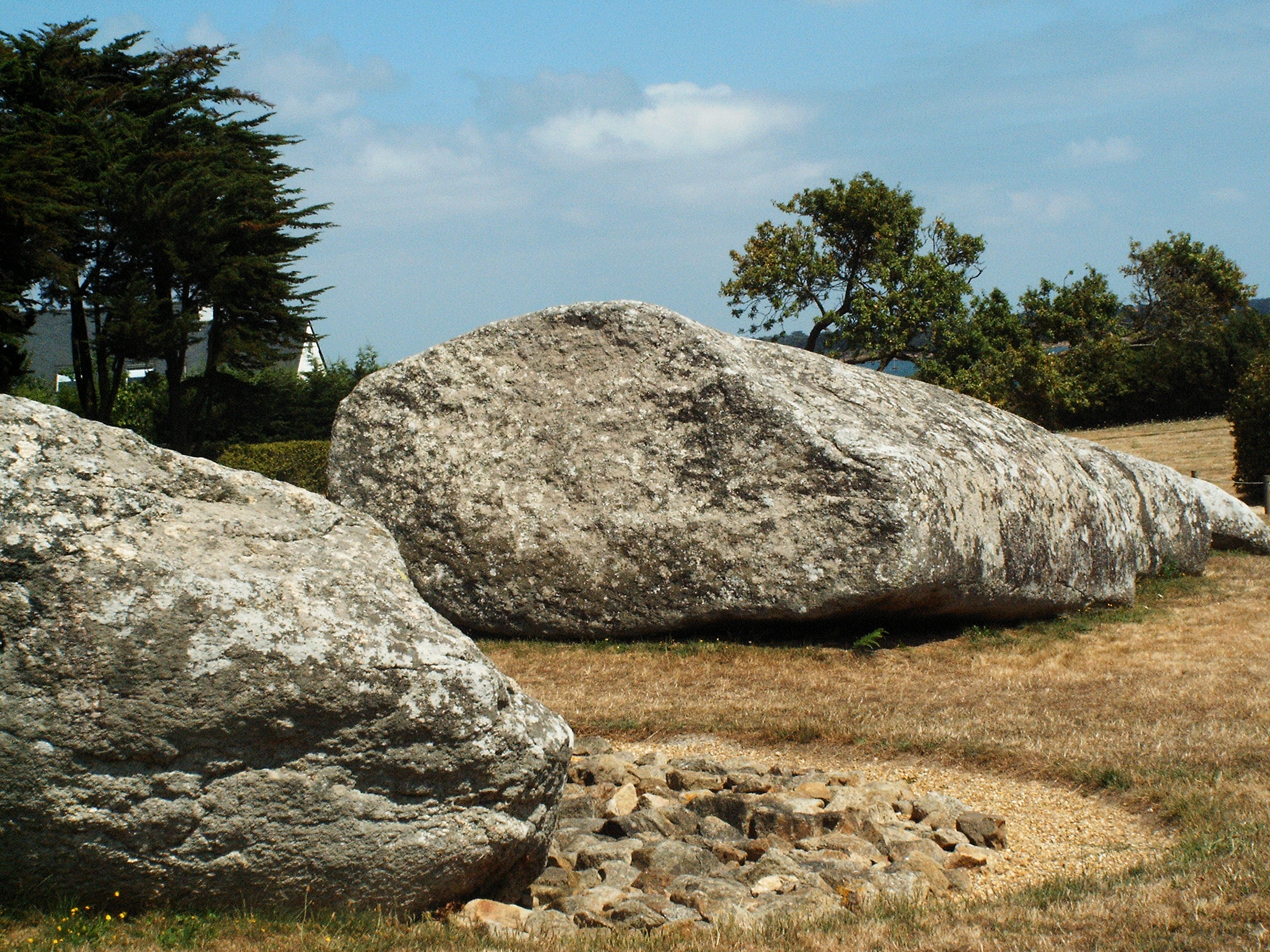
Grand Menhir

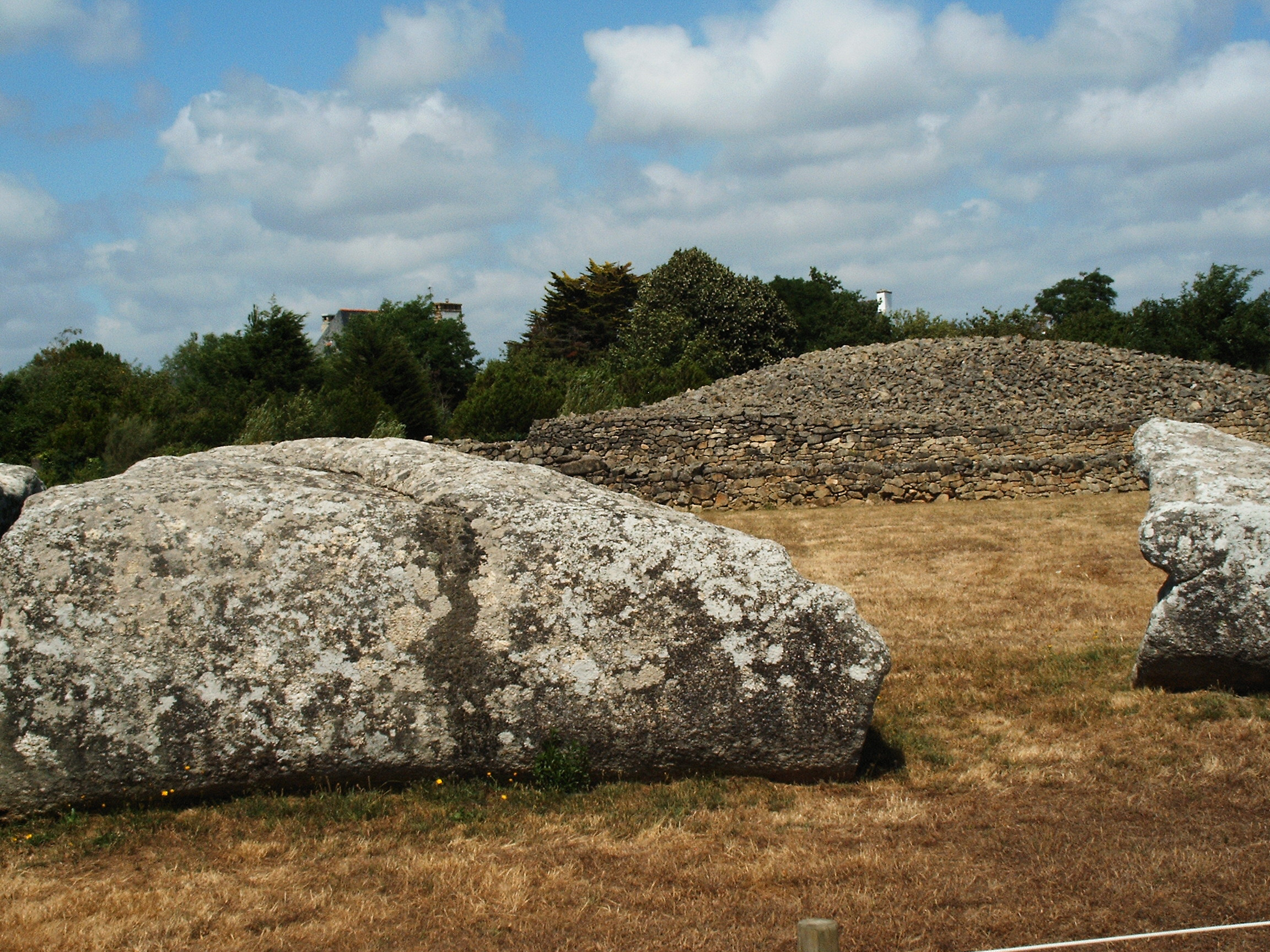
Grand Menhir + Table des Marchand

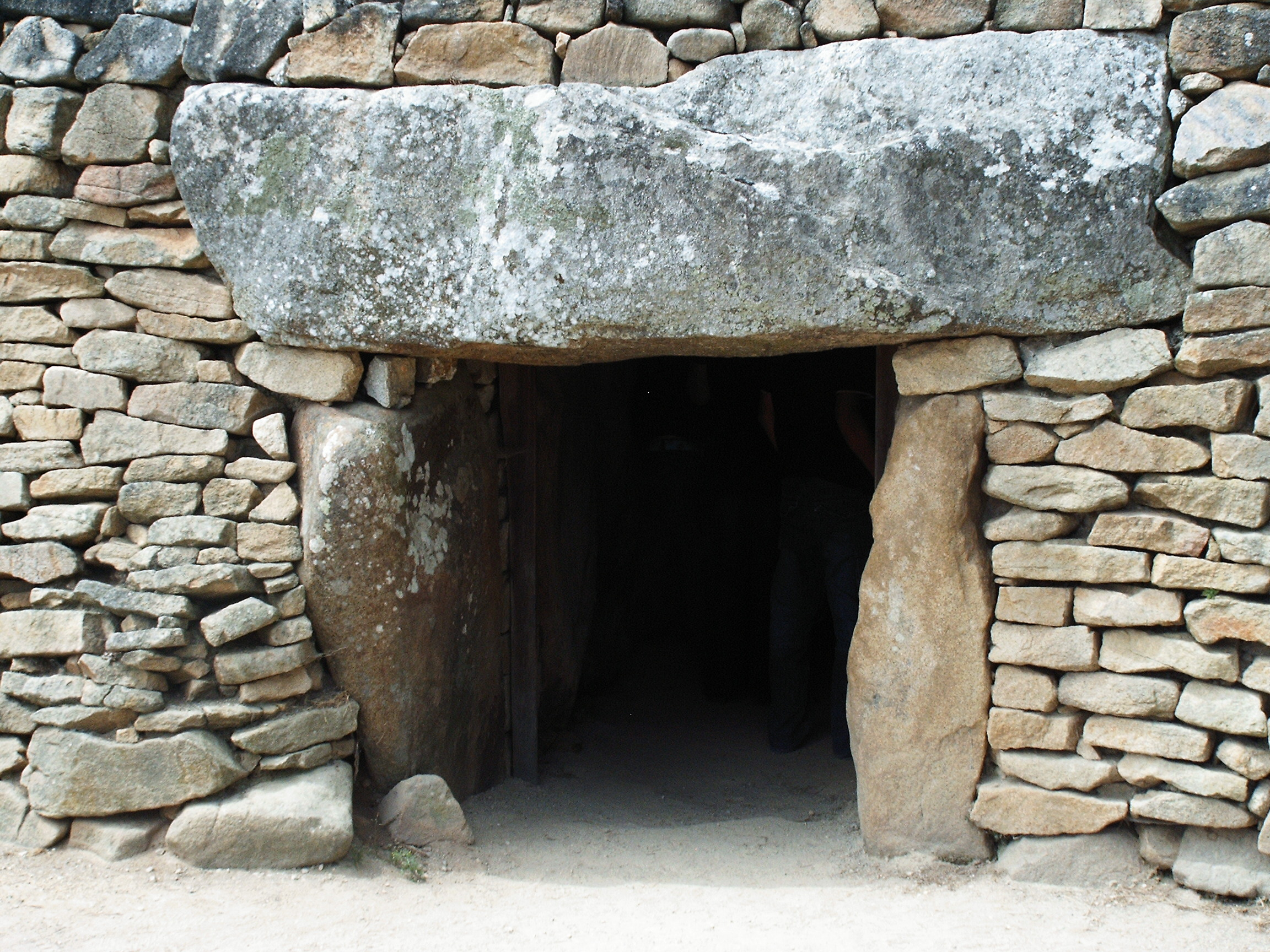
Table des Marchand

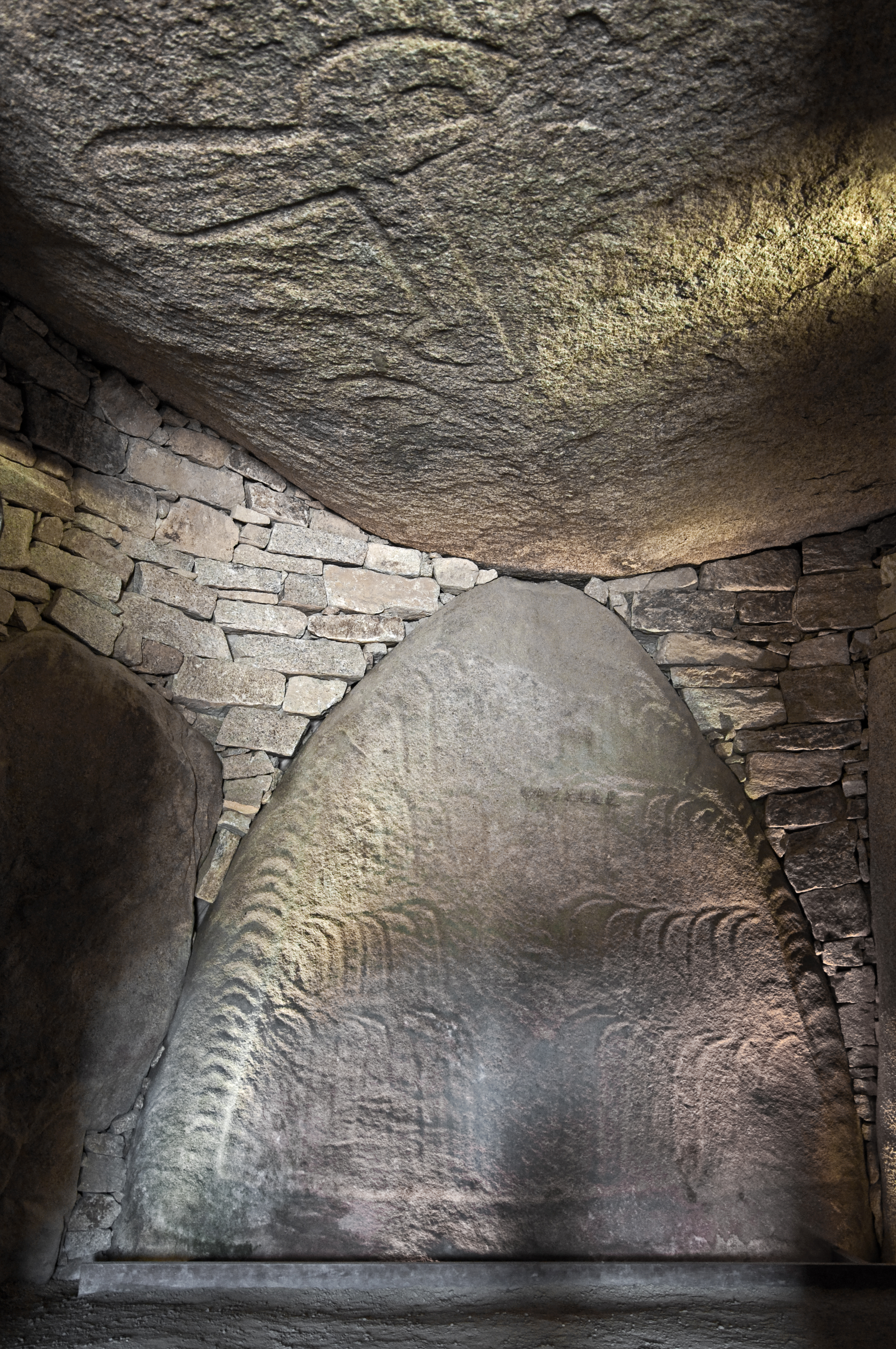
Table des Marchand: inside the burial chamber

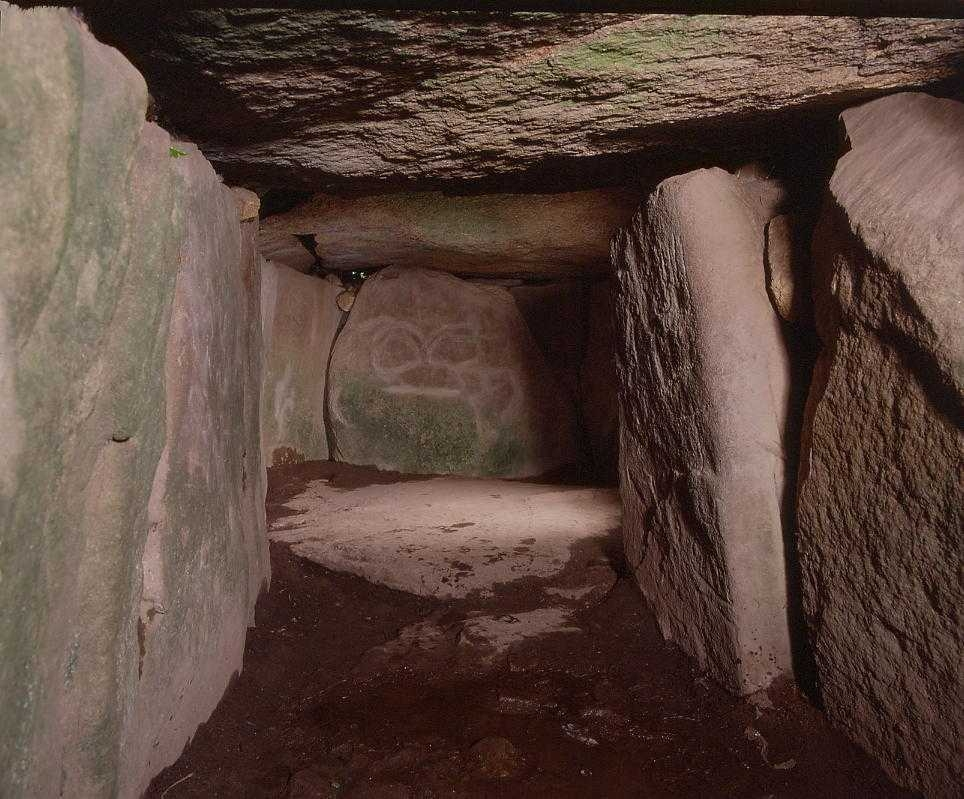
Dolmen du Mané Lud

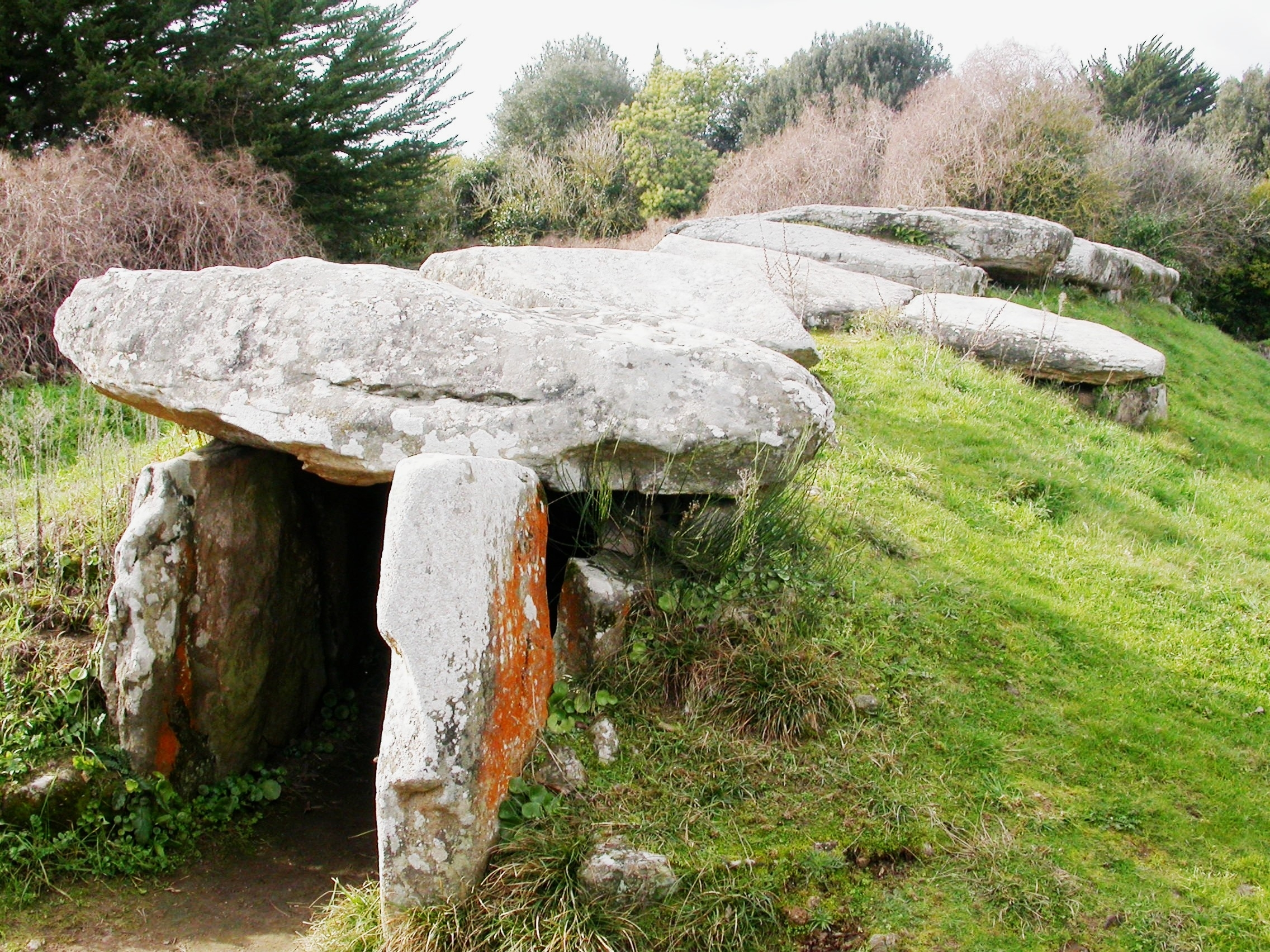
Dolmen du Mané Retual

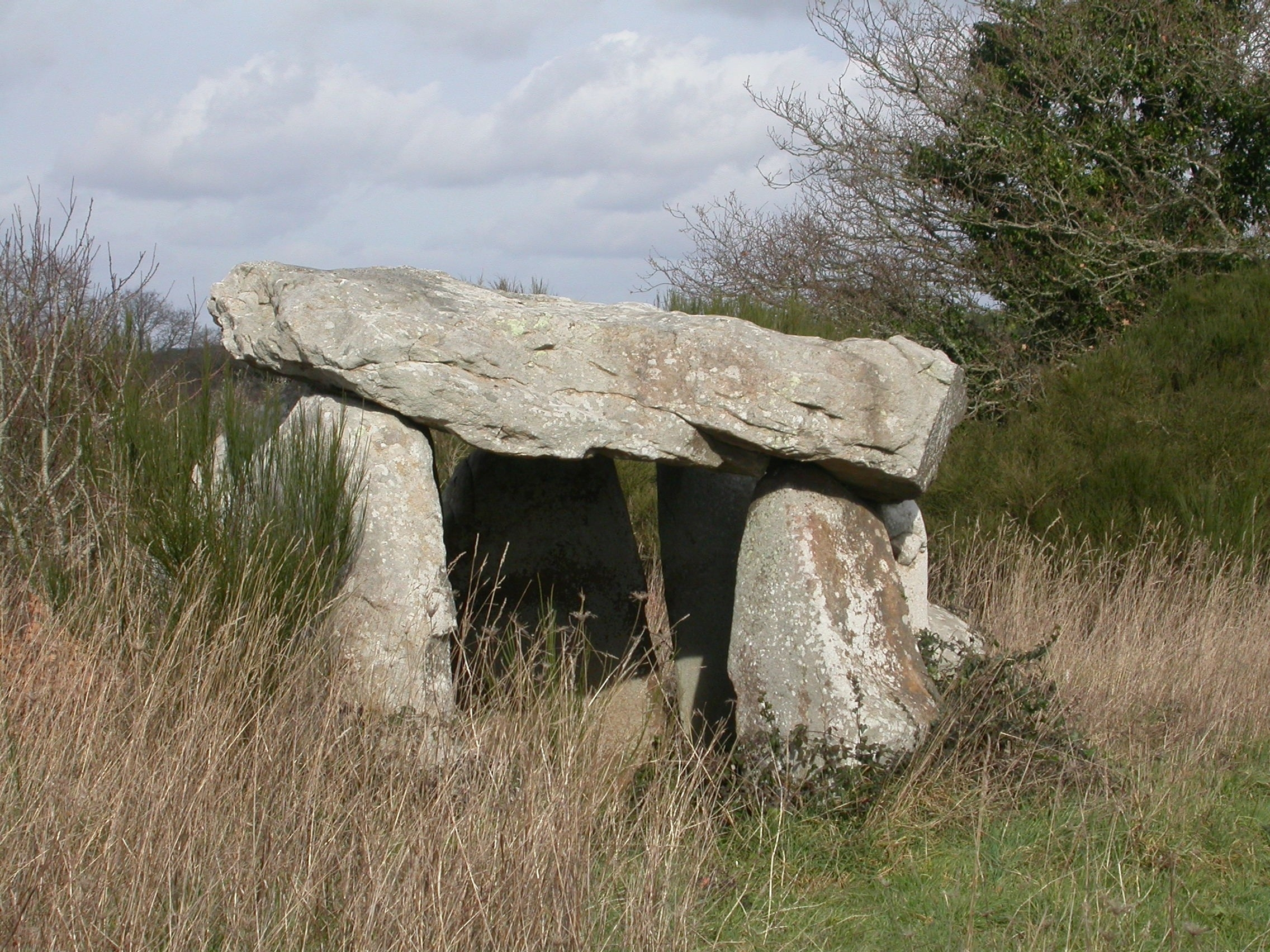
Dolmen de Kercadoret

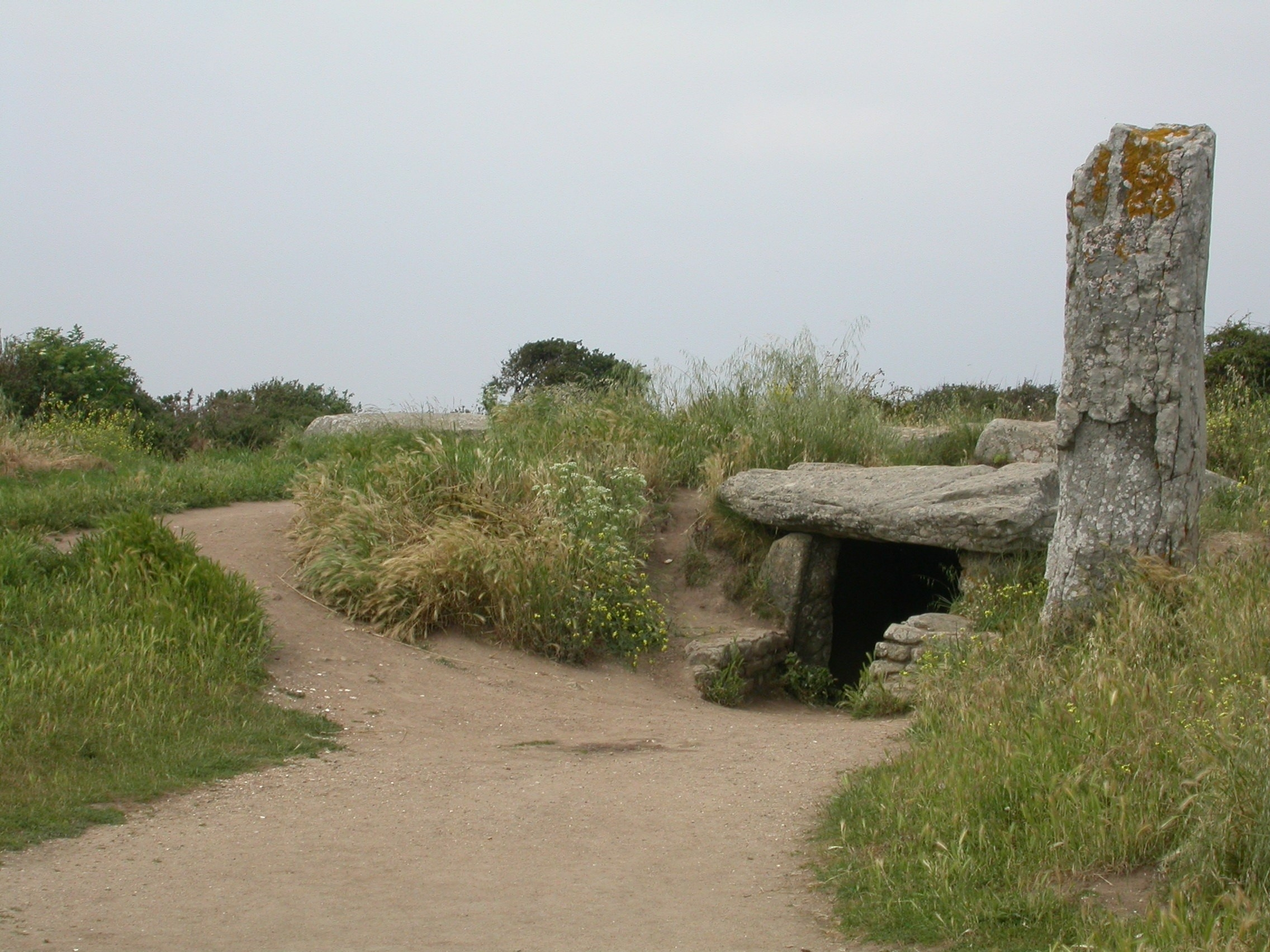
Les Pierres Plates

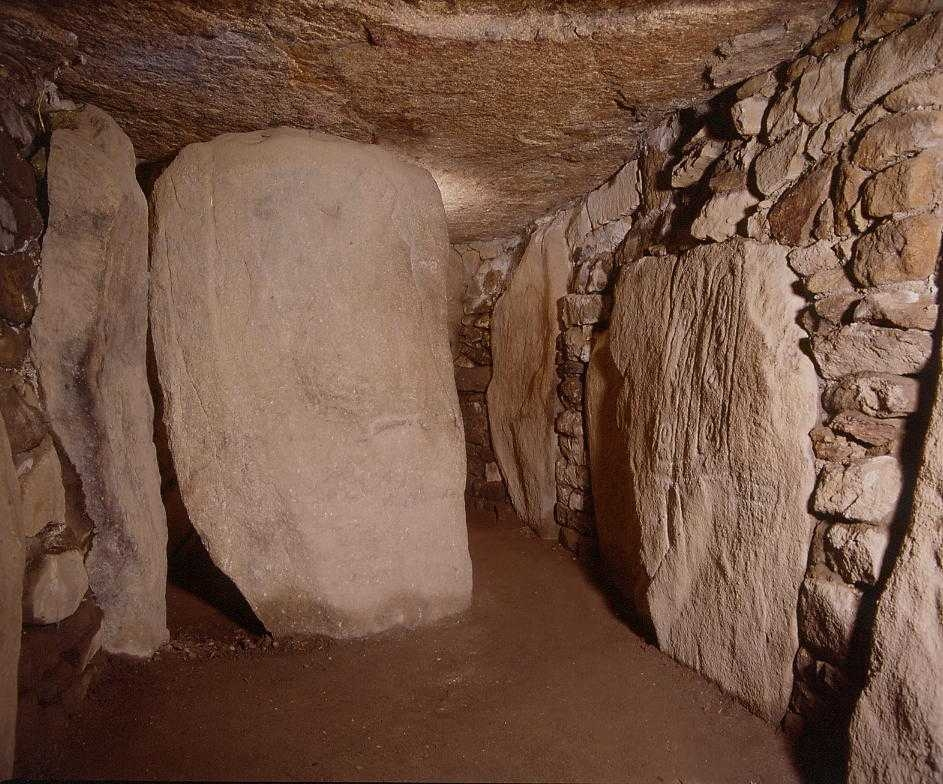
Les Pierres Plates

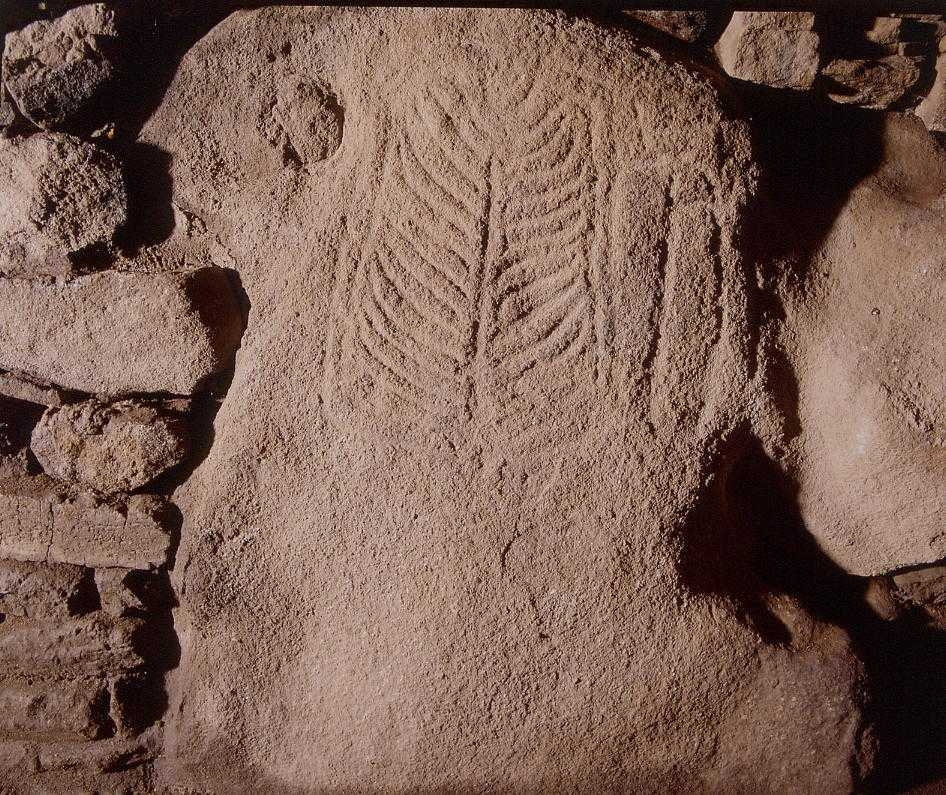
Les Pierres Plates

== See also ==
- Carnac Stones
- Communes of the Morbihan department

== Notes ==
One important reference is The Oysters of Locmariaquer by Eleanor Clark, who won the National Book Award in 1965 for her work on the history, culture, and oyster industry in this Breton seaport.
