= Prehistory of Brittany =

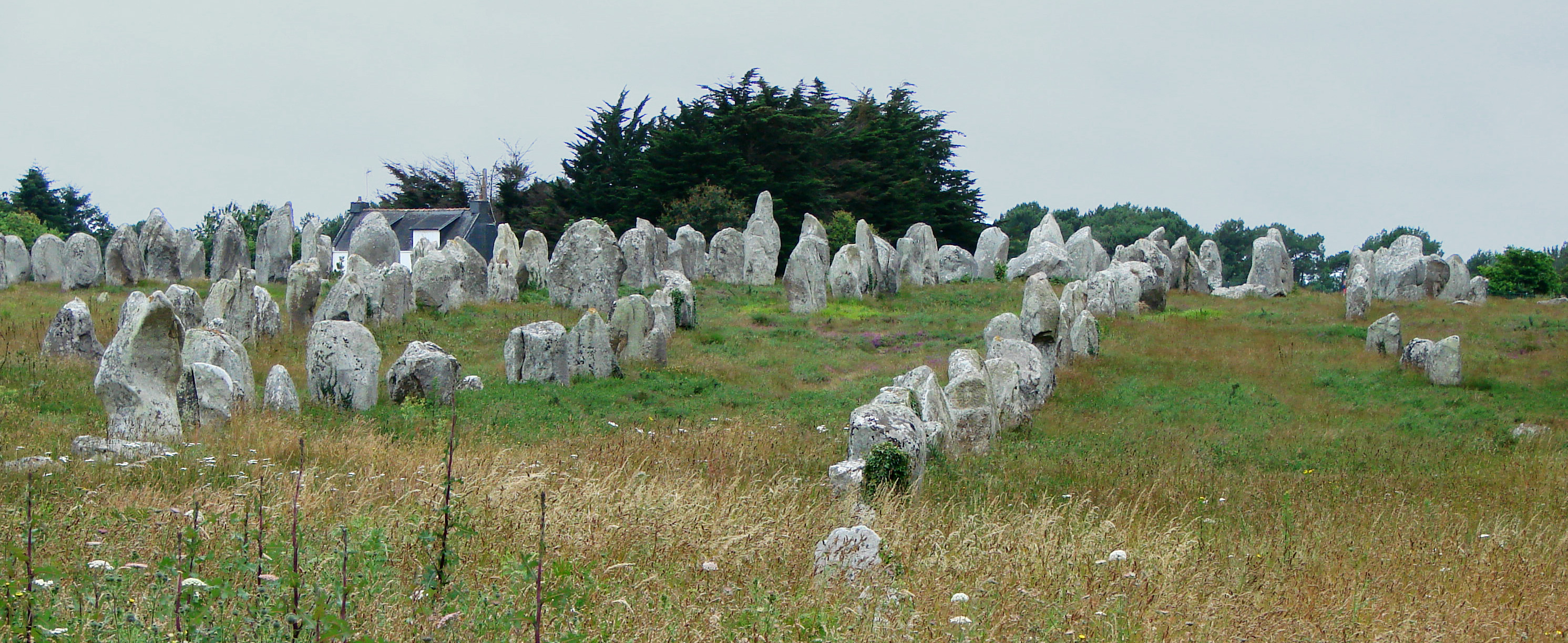
The alignments of Carnac, the largest collection of megaliths in the world, demonstrate the organisation of Neolithic culture in Brittany

This page concerns the prehistory of Brittany.

== Palaeolithic ==
Brittany was never glaciated during the Quaternary, owing to its latitude, proximity to the coast and absence of significant mountain ranges. However, even though free of glaciers, Palaeolithic Brittany was extremely cold compared to its present climate, with annual mean temperatures at the last glacial maximum estimated at -3 °C (27 °F). Permafrost was present with only a very shallow active layer estimated at only 1 foot (30 cm) thawing each summer, so that only a very light (less than 5 percent) cover of tundra could grow. This vegetation could only support very low densities of grazing mammals like reindeer, which (in Europe) are found today only in areas then uninhabitable due to the presence of thick ice sheets.

Consequently, few if any people could survive in Brittany prior to the end of the last glaciation, and only a few Palaeolithic sites are known from Brittany, like the rock shelter of Perros-Guirec near Rochworn. The only cave site known so far is Roc'h Toul in a sandstone promontory near Guiclan (Finistère). The cave contained about 200 artifacts and was dated to the late Magdalenian by de Mortillet. Because of the presence of points with curved backs, it is now connected with the Epipalaeolithic Azilian. Other Azilian sites include Parc-an-Plenen and Enez Guennoc.

== Mesolithic ==
The best-known mesolithic sites from Brittany are the cemeteries on the islands of Hoëdic (10 graves) and Téviec (9 graves) in Morbihan. The collective graves are placed in shell middens without any particular order. Some graves show evidence of postmortal manipulations of the bones. There are single burials and empty graves (cenotaphs) as well. The graves are covered with stones, a hearth or antlers forming a sort of dome. Rich funeral gifts, flint tools, engraved bones, shell ornaments and ochre demonstrate the affluence of these hunter-gatherers, or rather fisher-gatherers. Certain shells are sex-specific.

In Teviec there are stone cist graves. The bones of an infant have been postmortally ornamented with striations.

The corresponding settlements consist of shell middens. A radiocarbon date of 4625 (uncal.) for Hoëdic places it in the 6th Millennium BC cal, rather late in the Mesolithic sequence, and indeed there are some indications of contact with agricultural societies to the East. Their economy was based on marine resources. Recently, a number of accelerator dates have been published for Hoëdic.

In Beg an Dorchenn in Plomeur (Finistère), domestic dog and cattle were already present, in Dissignac, microliths were associated with pollen evidence for clearances.

Some scholars speculate that megalithic graves might go back to the Mesolithic, but this contention is difficult to prove, as most structures have been reused. Large numbers of microliths have been found under the chambered tomb of Dissignac fr:Tumulus de Dissignac.

== Neolithic ==
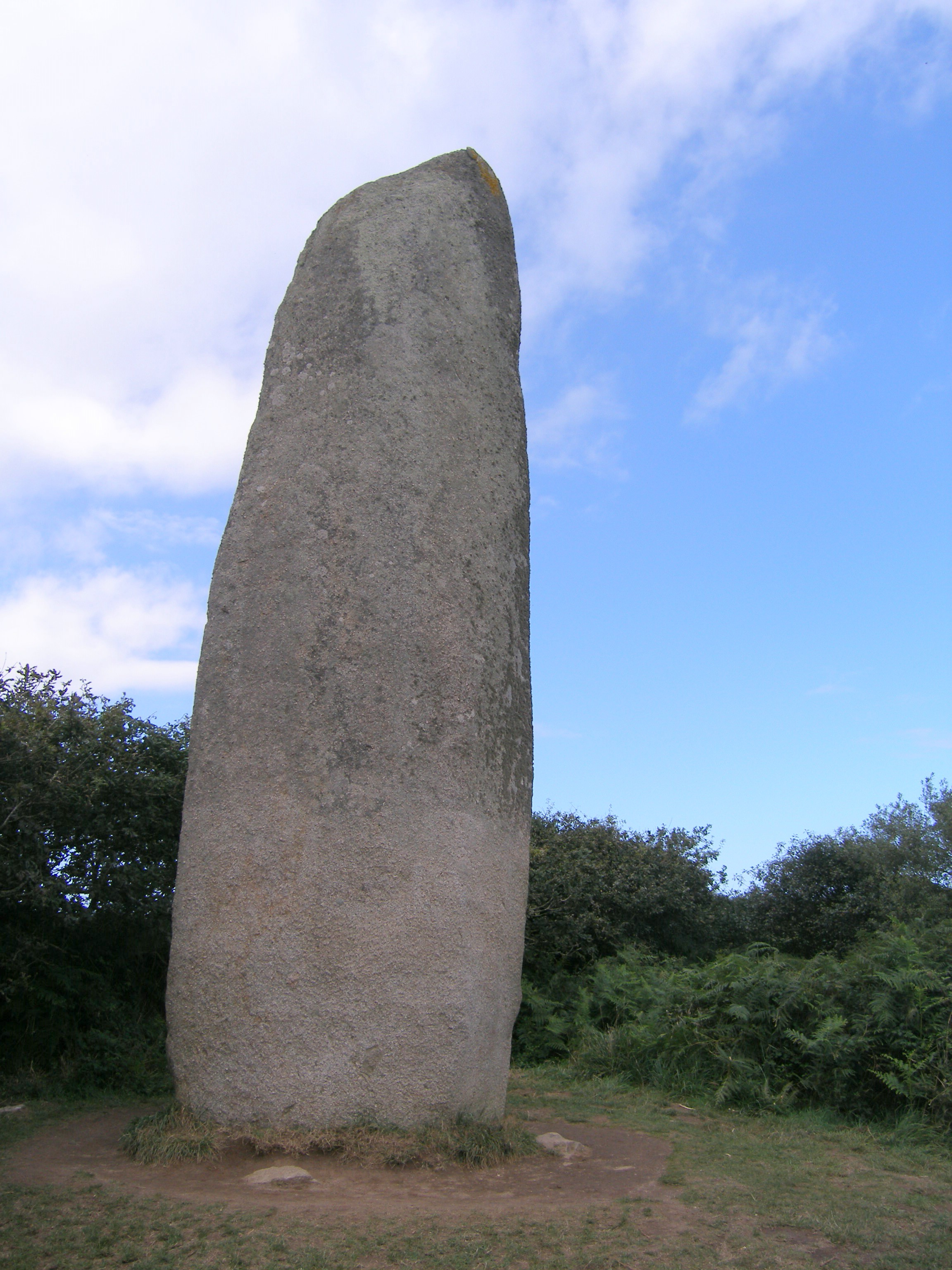
The Kerloas Menhir, near Plouarzel. With a height of 9.5 metres this menhir is the tallest standing menhir in Brittany. A few centuries ago the top was knocked off in a thunder storm: originally it must have been over 10 metres high.

The westernmost extensions of the Villeneuve-Saint-Germain culture, based on a Linear Pottery culture tradition are found in eastern Brittany at Le Haut Meé. The use of schist from the eastern edge of the Breton Massif for bracelets in settlements in the Paris Bassin attests to widespread trade. A bracelet of polished stone found in a grave in the VSG-settlement of Jablines Les-Longues-Raies was made of amphibolite from the island of Groix in southern Morbihan, proves trade with local Mesolithic communities.

The earliest long mounds date to the early-5th millennium (Barnenez). The early passage graves generally date to between 4000 and 3000 bc, followed by evolved passage graves between 3000-2500 bc. In the later part of the Neolithic, allées couvertes and simple dolmens became the predominant type of burial monument. Some passage graves are decorated with incised lines, of which Gavrinis is probably the best known example.

Some scholars see an influence of the central European Linear Pottery culture in the finds from the longbarrows of Mané Ty Ec and Mané Pochat er Ieu (Morbihan), but this should rather be connected to the la Hoguette tradition, ultimately of Cardial extraction.

Carn-pottery, thin walled round based deep bowls, often with applied crescents (croissants) is typical for early chambered tombs. It is found in Finistère, Morbihan and Loire-Atlantique.

Middle Neolithic settlements include La Motte, La Butte-aux-Pierres and Lannic. They mainly concentrate on the Coast. The pottery shows Chasséen influences. Bowls are still round-bottomed, but with s-shaped profiles and vertically perforated lugs. Some geometric decoration occurs, but is rather rare. Vase-supports of Chassey-type are found as well, the Breton variety has been named the Er Lannic type and is characterised by triangular perforations, while the examples found in the Channel Islands show circular perforations. Other local pottery types include Castellic grooved ware, Souc'h-ware, and Colpo-type ware.

Stone circles like Er Lannic (a double oval of standing stones and a ditch) sometimes contain settlement material and pottery of Chasséen-type.

By the middle of the 3rd century, the Kerugou, upper and lower Conguel and Rosmeur/Croh Collé types became preponderant.

Seine-Oise-Marne culture-influenced pottery in central Brittany includes the Quessoy and Crec'h Quille/Le Melus types. Collared bottles can be related to the Kragenflaschenhorizont of the late TBK.

From the late 3rd millennium, Grand-Pressigny flint was imported in some quantity. Some type of Breton axes were exported. For example, dolerite axes made at Plussulien have been found in Britain. The dolmen Mané-Lud at Locmariaquer is thought to show a picture of a boat.

Beaker material is known from some settlement sites, for example Kastel Koz, other beakers were found in rivers. Marine beakers predominate, AOC-decoration is found in Southern Brittany. Small gold plaques are known from beaker graves, in Kerouaren a diadem has been found.

There is no indication that the beaker people already exploited the Armorican metal deposits.

== Bronze Age ==
The early Bronze Age culture is commonly believed to have grown out of Beaker roots, with some Wessex and Unetice influence. In the early Bronze Age (Armorican Tumulus culture), rich individual graves are found under barrows, which indicates a complete change of the social structure. The Breton barrows have been divided into two series by Cogné and Guiot, the first dating from 1900-1600 bc, the second to 1600-1400 bc. The barrows of the first series can be up to 50 m in diameter and 6 m high. They are found in Western Brittany, along the coast, the Blavet river and at the southern border of the Monts d'Arrée. A few examples have been recorded from Normandy. The barrows contain a small cairn over a stone cist, wooden coffin or dry stone structure containing the burial. Often the chambers are covered by large stone slabs. Sometimes roofed mortuary houses are found, for example at St. Jude en Bourbriac. The stone cists can be quite large, up to 4 m long, but always only contain a single body. Grave gifts include amber beads, silver cups, gold-hilted daggers (Saint Adrien), tanged flint arrowheads and stone axes. Because of these rich grave goods, J. Briard sees them as burials of warrior-priests. Certainly not everybody was buried in this way, but nothing is known of "commoner-burials", especially as bones are not normally preserved in the acidic soils of Brittany. The gold-pin decoration of the dagger hilts and the amber-beads show close connection to the Wessex-culture, but there are technical differences.

The barrow of Kernonen en Plouvorn, Finistère, provides a good example of a rich burial of the first series.

The barrows of the second series are a bit smaller and show a more inland-distribution. They do not normally contain metal, but numerous pottery vessels, high biconical vessels, sometimes with a geometric decoration under the rim, or single four-handled undecorated pots. There seems to be no division of the grave goods by gender.

Glass-beads are found in some graves, for example at Mez-Nabat, Plouhinec (Finistère).

A number of radiocarbon-dates are known from the barrows:

name of site	dept.	Lab number	date	standard deviation
Plouvorn, Kernonen	Finistère	Gif-805	1960	120
Melrand, Saint-Fiacre	Morbihan	Gif-863	1950	135
Goarem Goasven	Finistère	Gif-1313	1850	130
Saint Evarzec, Kerhuel	Finistère	Gif-482	1630	200
Kervigny	Finistère	Gif-2481	1560	100
Ligollenec, Berrien	Finistère	Gif-1866	1550	120
Kerno en Ploudariel	Finistère	Gif-2421	1500	100
Plouvorn, Kernonen	Finistère	Gif-1149	1480	120
Cleger, Kervelerin	Finistère	Gsy-86	1345	150
Guidel, Tuchenn Cruguel	Finistère	Gif-235	1320	200
Cleder, Le Helen	Finistère	Gif-748	1300	115
Plouzévédé, Ar Réunic	Finistère	Gif-1113	1250	120
Plouvorn, Kernonen	Finistère	Gif-806	1250	120
Plouzévédé, Ar Réunic	Finistère	Gif-1115	1210	120
Plouvorn, Kernonen	Finistère	Gif-807	1200	120
Goarem Goasven	Finistère	Gif-1314	1050	130
Courcoury	Charente Maritime	Gif-2347	850	70
Plouhinec, Lescongar	Finistère	Gif-2347	850	70
Crée de Carat	Finistère	GrN-1973	700	60

The later part of the early Bronze Age saw the beginning of the exploitation of the Armorican tin deposits. Numerous hoards contain tools and weapons, but metalwork is rarely found in burials or settlements, which makes the synchronisation of hoards and settlements difficult. The Tréboul-group of hoards is thought to be contemporaneous with the second series barrows. Decorated spear-heads, flanged axes, palstaves and long daggers are typical. The hoard from Bignan (Morbihan) contained only bronze jewellery.

Coastal salterns are known from the late Bronze Age onwards as well, for example at Curnic, Guissény.

Pollen analysis shows that widespread clearance of the beech forests took place in the early Bronze Age. Cereal pollen have been found at Porsguen, Plouescat, for example. Domestic animals included sheep, goats and cattle, but hunting may have still provided a lot of meat. La Roche, Videlles, has still 60% wild animals among the animal bones, but it is not clear if this is typical. Carbonised remains of naked wheat and barley have been found at Plounéour-Trez, hazelnuts and acorns were eaten as well. Flint still formed an important part of the tool inventory.

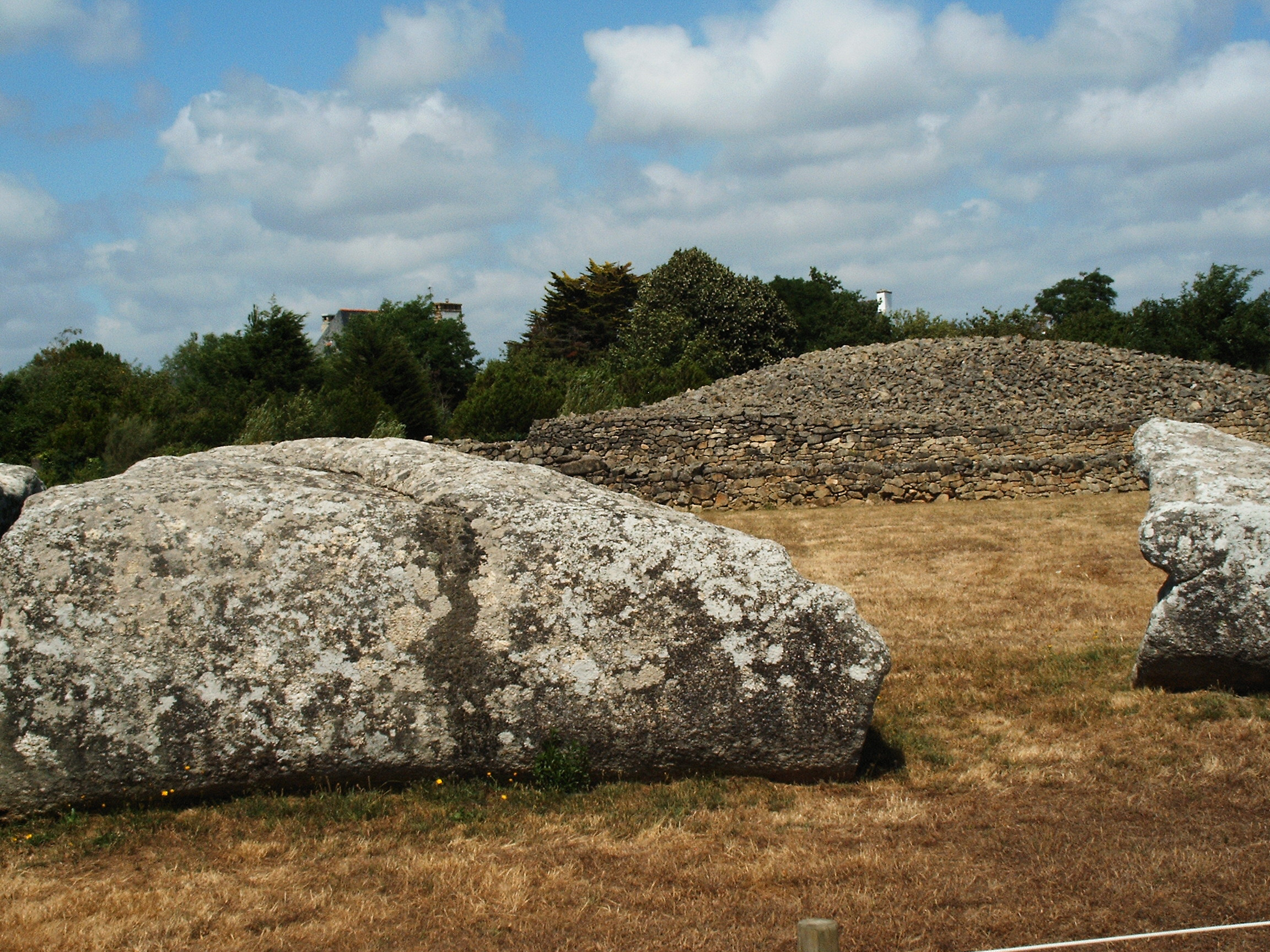
The Grand Menhir Brisé and Table des Marchand at Locmariaquer

Some standing stones (Menhirs) and stone alignments date to the early Bronze Age, for example the Grand Menhir Brisé at Locmariaquer.

The later Bronze Age sees only a slight Urnfield influence. Hoards are numerous. The Saint-Brieuc-des-Iffs phase marks the beginnings of the Atlantic bronze industries. It is succeeded by the carp's-tongue complex, found in Britain and Portugal as well.

The square-socketed armorican axes turn up in hoards in great numbers. At Maure-de-Bretagne, over 4000 axes have been found, ca. 800 at Tréhou and Loudéac.

The axes are mainly unused and may have been a form of ingot of primitive currency. They contain a high amount of lead or consist of pure lead and are distributed from the Iberian Peninsula to eastern Germany, Ireland and Southern Britain, with some pieces from Scotland, Poland and Switzerland. Different regional types are known: Brandivy in Morbihan, Dahouet and Plurien on the North coast, Tréhou in Finistère. The miniature types of Maure-de-Bretagne, Ille-et-Vilaine and Couville are typical of Upper Brittany.

Copper was imported from Spain as plano-convex ingots, as found in the hoard of Penfoul, Landelau.

Settlements have rarely been excavated, Ploubazlanec at the mouth of the Trieux is an example of a fortified village.

The Museum of PreHistory in Carnac has large quantities of Late Bronze Age bronze and copper artifacts from the Atlantic Bronze Age culture. This culture was a maritime trading-networked culture that included Brittany and most of the rest of France, the other Celtic nations, England, Spain and Portugal. According to John T. Koch, Barry Cunliffe, Karl, and Wodtko, Celtic languages developed in the intense interactions of this culture with the Tartessian language the first written language so far discovered from this era, but this view stands in contrast to the more generally accepted view of Celticists that their origin lies with the Central European Hallstatt culture and that Tartessian cannot be classified as Celtic at all.

== Iron Age ==
A variety of tribes are mentioned in Roman sources, like the Veneti, Armoricani, Osismii, Namnetes and Coriosolites. Strabo and Poseidonius described the Armoricani as belonging to the Belgae.

Armorican gold coins were widely exported and have been found in the Rhineland.

Salterns are widespread in Northern Armorica, for example at Trégor, Ebihens and Enez Vihan near Pleumeur-Bodou (Côtes-d'Armor) and the island of Yoc'h near Landuvez (Finistère) of late La Tène date.

An estimated 40–55 kg of salt per oven were produced at Ebihens. Each oven was about 2 m long. The site dates to the end of the early La Tène or the middle La Tène period. Numerous briquetage-remains have been found. At Tregor, boudins de Calage (hand-bricks) were the typical form of briquetage, between 2,5 and 15 cm long and with a diameter between 4–7 cm. At the salterns at Landrellec and Enez Vihan at Pleumeur-Bodou the remains of rectangular ovens have been excavated that are 2,5–3 m long and ca. 1 m wide and constructed of stones and clay. On the Gulf of Morbihan about 50 salterns have been found so far, mainly dating to the final La Téne period.

== Bibliography ==
- Bowen, E. G. (1977) Saints, Seaways and Settlements in the Celtic Lands. Cardiff: University of Wales Press ISBN 0-900768-30-4
- Monnier, Jean-Jacques & Cassard, Jean-Christophe, with a team of scholars of the Breton Universities of Brest, Nantes, and Rennes (1996) "Toute l’histoire de Bretagne" in Britain and in Brittany; 800 pages. Morlaix: Editions Skol-Vreizh ISBN 2-903313-95-4
- Tonnerre, Noël-Yves (1994) Naissance de la Bretagne; 621 pp. Angers: Presse de l'Université d' Angers
- Fleuriot, Léon (1980) Les origines de la Bretagne. Paris: Éd. Payot ISBN 2-228-12710-8
- Dillon, Myles, Chadwick, Nora & Guyonvarc'h, Christian-J. Les royaumes celtiques, Librairie Arthème Fayard, 1974.ISBN 2-213-00077-8
- Dillon, Myles & Chadwick, Nora (1967) The Celtic Realms. London: Weidenfeld and Nicolson
- L'Histoire de la Bretagne et des pays celtiques, Morlaix, Skol Vreizh, 1966
- Le Moyne de la Borderie, Arthur (1905) Histoire de la Bretagne; 6 vol. 4to, Plihon Editeur, Imprimerie Vatar, Rennes 1905-1914.
- Lobineau, Dom (1707) Histoire de Bretagne; 2 vol. folio Paris: veuve Muguet
- Morice, Dom & Taillandier, Dom (1750) Histoire de Bretagne; 2 vol. folio. Paris:, veuve elaguette, 1750-1756.
- Morice, Dom & Taillandier, Dom (1742) Mémoires pour servir de preuves à l'Histoire de Bretagne; 3 vol. folio. Paris: Ch. Osmont, 1742-1746.

== See also ==
- Prehistoric France
