= Stepped profile =

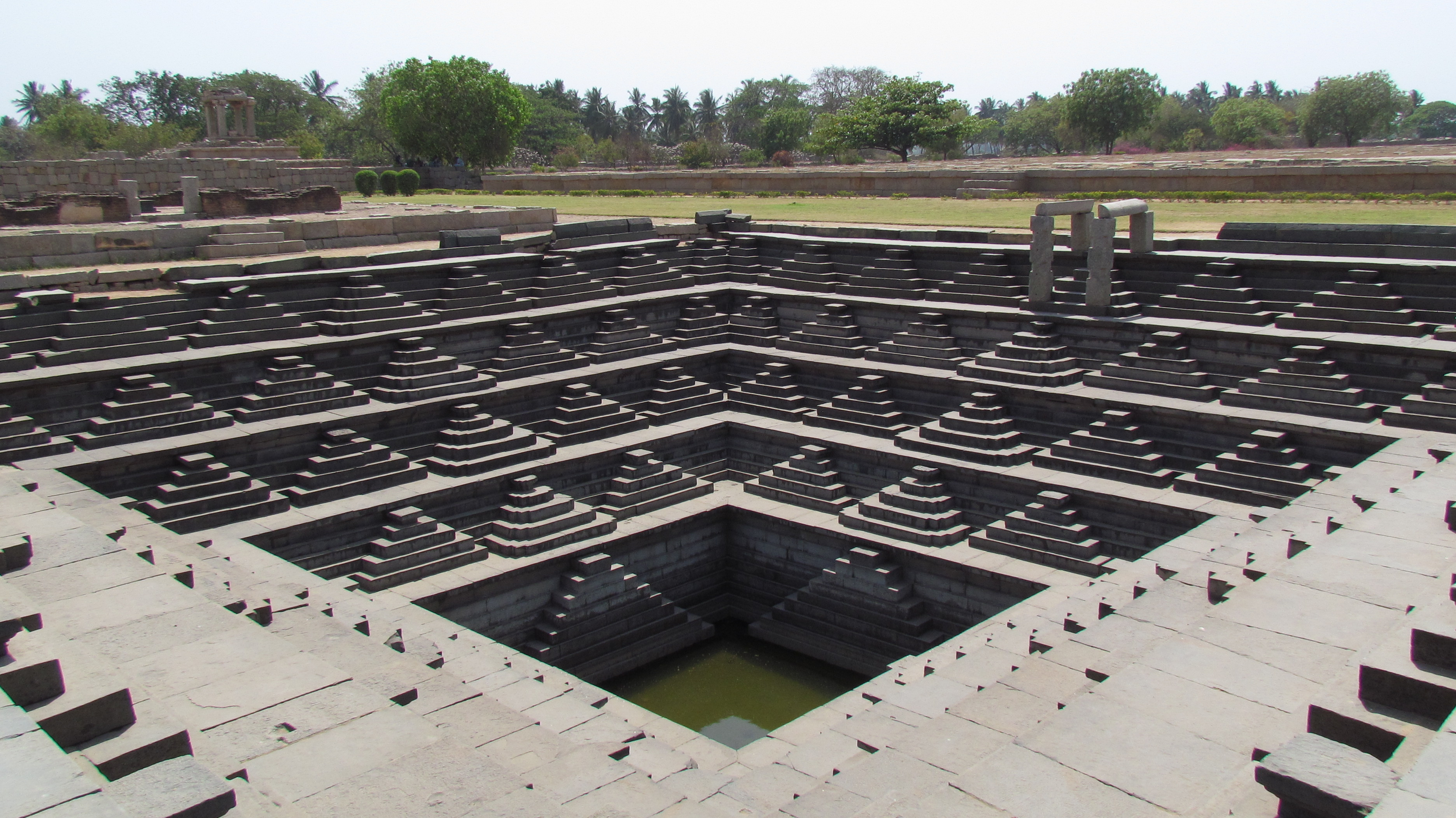
A water tank with a stepped profile at Hampi, a UNESCO World Heritage Site in Karnataka, India

A stepped profile describes the edge of something that has a series of defined steps. It has applications in architecture, construction, engineering, and geology.

== Applications ==
=== Architecture and construction ===
In building design a stepped profile is used to reduce the visual impact of, or airborne noise around a building. A stepped profile is also used to calculate seismic and wind loads in multi-story building design.

The spillway from a dam can have a stepped profile, which dissipates energy from the released water.

=== Engineering ===
In engineering, a stepped profile may be used on a bearing surface to reduce friction between the moving parts.

=== Geology ===
A mountain with a stepped profile has a number of denudation terraces caused by erosion.

A river with a stepped profile has a step-like variation in its gradient along its length. This may be caused by changes in the height of the underlying bedrock.

== Notable examples ==
- Altar Mountain, a mountain in Victoria Land, Antarctica
- Drapers' Gardens, an office block in the City of London, United Kingdom
- Cairn of Barnenez, a Neolithic monument in Brittany, France

== See also ==
- Setback (architecture)
- Stepped spillway
