= Throgmorton Street =

Street in the City of London

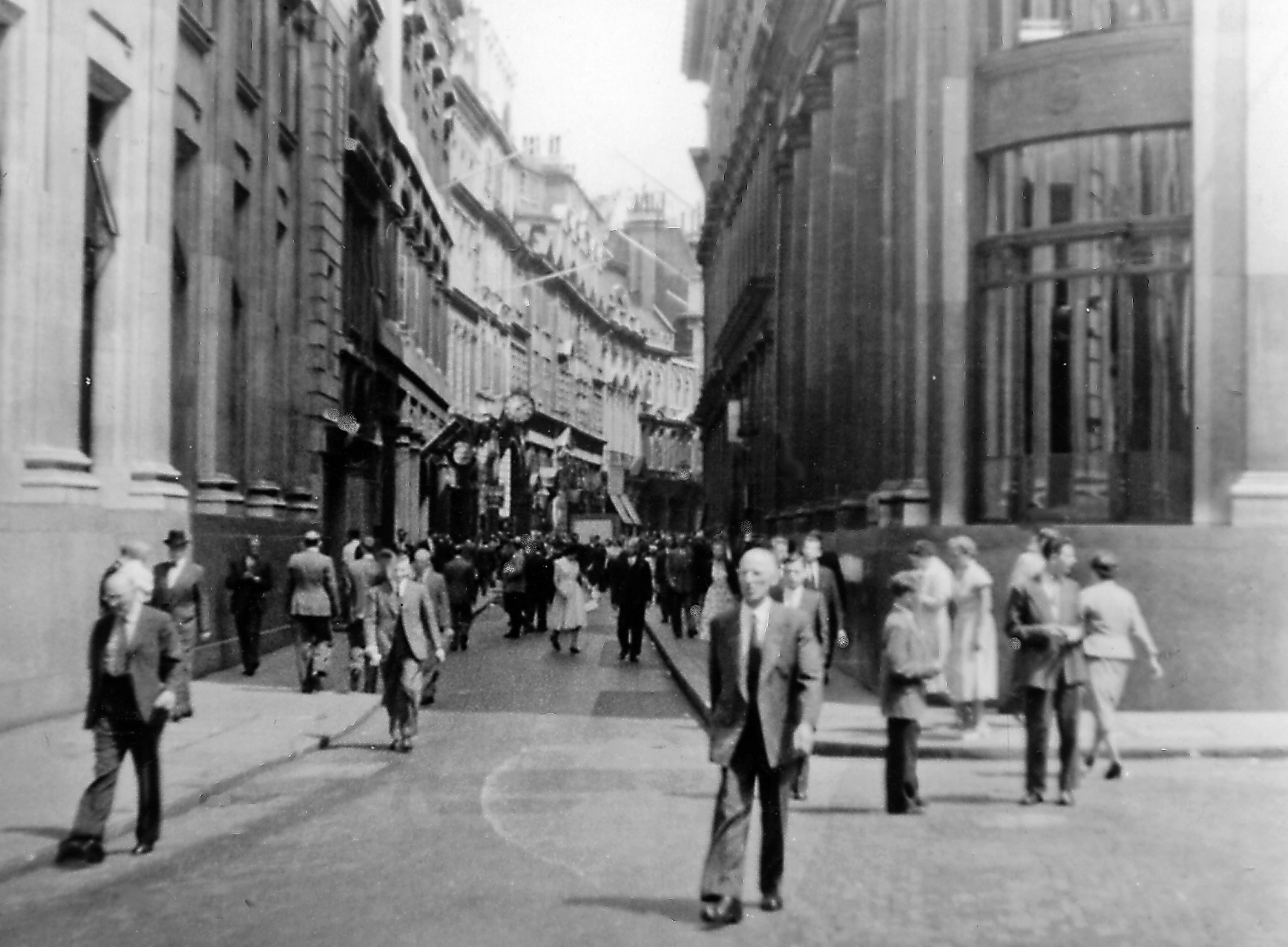
- Throgmorton Street in 1955
- Interactive map of Throgmorton Street
- Location: London, United Kingdom
- Postal code: EC2
- Nearest train station: Bank
- Coordinates: 51.51483°N 0.08674°W
- East end: Old Broad Street
- West end: Lothbury

Throgmorton Street is a road in the City of London that runs between Lothbury in the west and Old Broad Street in the east. Throgmorton Avenue runs from the north side of Throgmorton Street to London Wall.

== History ==
It is named after Nicholas Throckmorton, chief banker of England during the reign of Queen Elizabeth I and the head of an ancient Warwickshire family.

It was once part of the location of the Austin Friars home of Thomas Cromwell, King Henry VIII's chief minister. In 1543 for the sum of 1,800 marks, the site was purchased by the Draper Company from King Henry VIII who had inherited the estate on Cromwell's execution. The building overlooking Throgmorton Street was destroyed during the Great Fire of London in 1666 and subsequently rebuilt several times.

The London Stock Exchange occupied the southern side of Throgmorton Street from 1972 to 2004.

The Throgmorton Restaurant was a J. Lyons and Co. restaurant on the street, that operated from 1900 to 2013.

== Transport ==
The nearest London Underground station is Bank, which can be reached via Princes Street, a short distance to the south from Throgmorton Street's western end. The nearest mainline railway station is Liverpool Street.

== Throgmorton Avenue ==
Throgmorton Avenue runs from Throgmorton Street to London Wall: it is a private road belonging to the Drapers' livery company and Carpenters' livery company with gates at each end; there is also pedestrian access from Copthall Avenue and Austin Friars. The gates to London Wall are controlled by the Carpenters' Company and are open between about 7 am and 7 pm on working weekdays. The livery halls of both companies can be accessed from the avenue, as can Drapers' Gardens; the Drapers occasionally use their hall's grander entrance on Throgmorton Street.

== See also ==
- List of eponymous roads in London
