= Megalithic art =

Use of large stones as an artistic medium

Megalithic art refers to art either painted or carved onto megaliths in prehistoric Europe and found on the structural elements, like the kerbstones, orthostats, or capstones of megalithic tombs, but recent investigations have included decorations on stelae and menhirs.

Megalithic art is found in many places in Western Europe although the main concentrations are in England, Malta, Ireland, Brittany and Iberia. Megalithic art started in the Neolithic and continued into the Bronze Age. Although many monument types received this form of art the majority is carved on Neolithic passage graves. Megalithic art tends to be highly abstract and contains relatively few representations of recognizable real objects. Megalithic art is often similar to prehistoric rock art and contains many similar motifs such as the 'cup and ring mark', although the two forms of rock carving also have large stylistic differences. The meaning of megalithic art is the subject of much debate.

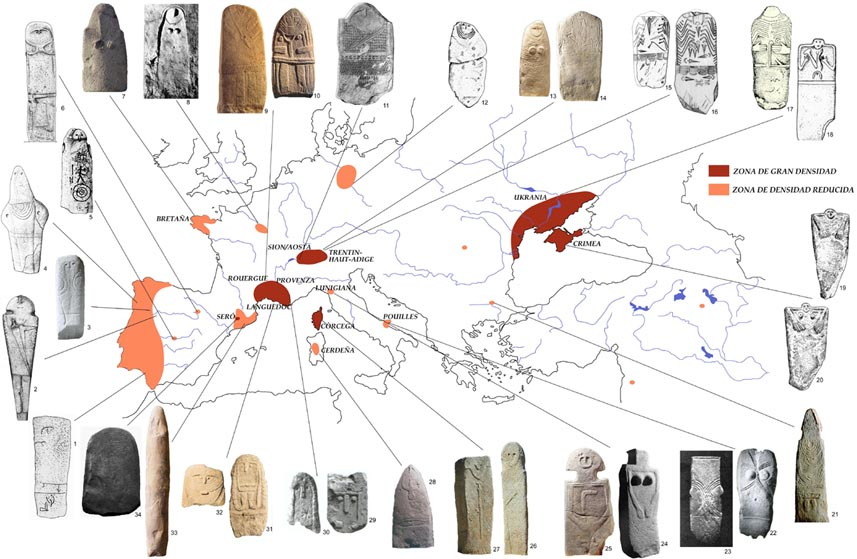
Map with statue-menhirs in Europe. Photos and draws: 1y 4.-Bueno et al. 2005; 2.-Santonja y Santonja 1978; 3.-Jorge 1999; 5.-Portela y Jiménez 1996; 6.-Romero 1981; 7.-Helgouach 1997; 8.- Tarrete 1997; 9, 10, 13, 14, 29, 30, 31, 32.-Philippon 2002; 11.-Corboud y Curdy 2009; 12.-Muller 1997; 15, 16, 17, 18, 19, 20, 21, 22, 23 Arnal 1976; 24 y 25.- Augusto 1972; 26 y 27.- Grosjean 1966; 34.- López et al. 2009.

Weathering and vandalism have affected many examples of the art, and little of it remains today.

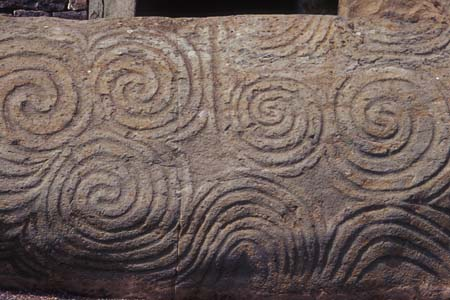
Newgrange entrance stone with megalithic art. Boyne Valley, Ireland

== Ireland ==
Ireland has the largest concentration of megalithic art in Europe, particularly in the Boyne Valley. This art form appears to be entirely abstract and is perhaps the most famous with its well-known multiple-spirals. It has been suggested that much of this artwork is entoptically derived from induced states of altered consciousness (Dronfield 1993). Stylistically the art of Ireland is similar to occasional finds in nearby Wales and the Scottish Isles. Approximately 70% of Ireland's ancient decorated rocks and stones are to be found in the Boyne Valley (o'Sullivan 1997;19)

== France ==
The French region of Brittany has the second highest concentration of megalithic art. The earliest examples in this area are with anthropomorphic representations on menhirs which later continued in passage graves. Brittany shares some motifs with both Ireland and Iberia and the level of contact between them has always been debated. Among the most famous examples are the passage grave at Gavrinis and the Barnenez mound.

== Iberia ==
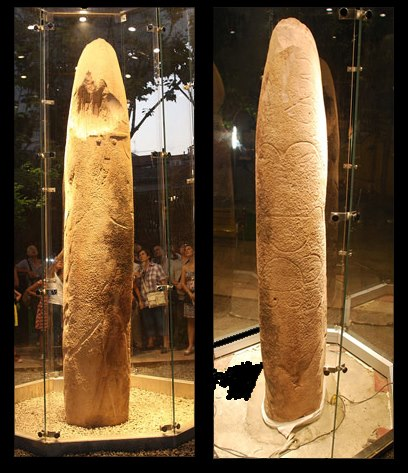
Estàtua-menhir del Pla de les Pruneres (Mollet del Vallès-Spain)

Iberian megalithic art contains the most number of realistic representations of objects, although there is also a strong abstract element. Iberia is the only place to have painted decoration as well as carved. Other areas may also have originally been painted, but Iberia's dry climate lends itself to preservation of the paint. The paint (as it currently survives) is normally restricted to black and red, although occasionally features white as well.

== Germany ==
Megalithic art is extremely rare in Central Europe. The gallery grave at Züschen in Germany is an intriguing exception, as it appears to mix motifs known from the west European megalithic tradition with others more familiar from alpine Rock art.

== Non-abstract art ==
As well as abstract or geometric art, some carvings are considered to represent tools, weapons, animals, human figures, deities or idols. The gallery graves of the Seine-Oise-Marne culture such as that at Courjeonnet have images of axes, breasts and necklaces carved on their walls. The meaning of some of these is disputed. For instance, some of the tombs in the valley of the Petit Morin in France and elsewhere contain engravings of breasts, noses, hair, and a collar or necklace. These have been described both as deities (occasionally as 'dolmen deities') and as representations of the deceased.

== Bibliography ==
- Dronfield, J. 1995. “Subjective Visions and the Source of Irish Megalithic Art.” in Antiquity 69, pp. 539–549
