= Drapers' Gardens =

Area in the City of London

Coordinates: 51.5158°N 0.087°W

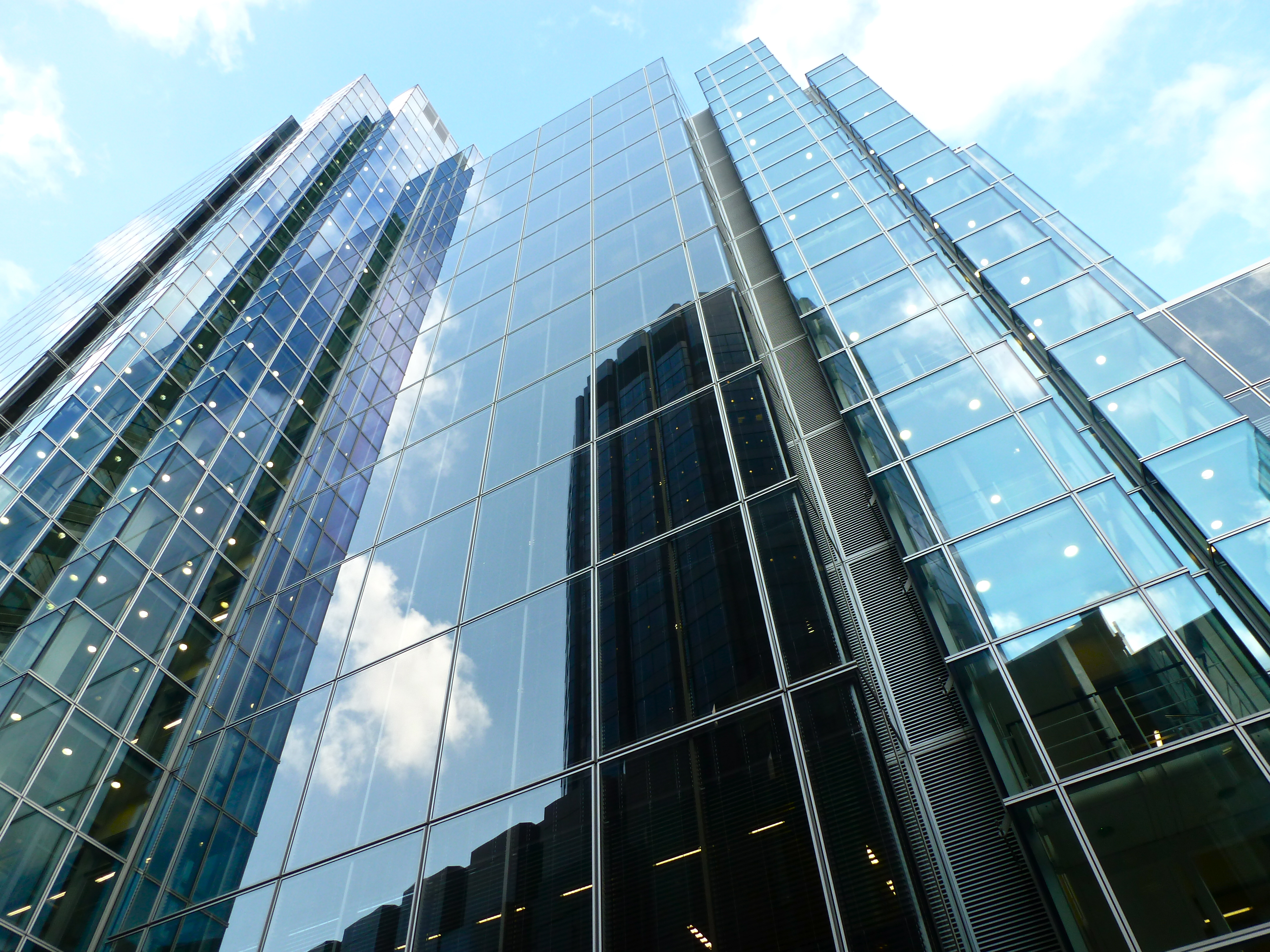
Drapers' Gardens in 2011

Drapers' Gardens is a site in the City of London at the junction of Throgmorton Avenue and Copthall Avenue on land owned by the Drapers' Company. Originally a garden space, it was largely built over by the early 20th century. It has been the site of two major office blocks since the 1960s.

== Before the 1960s ==
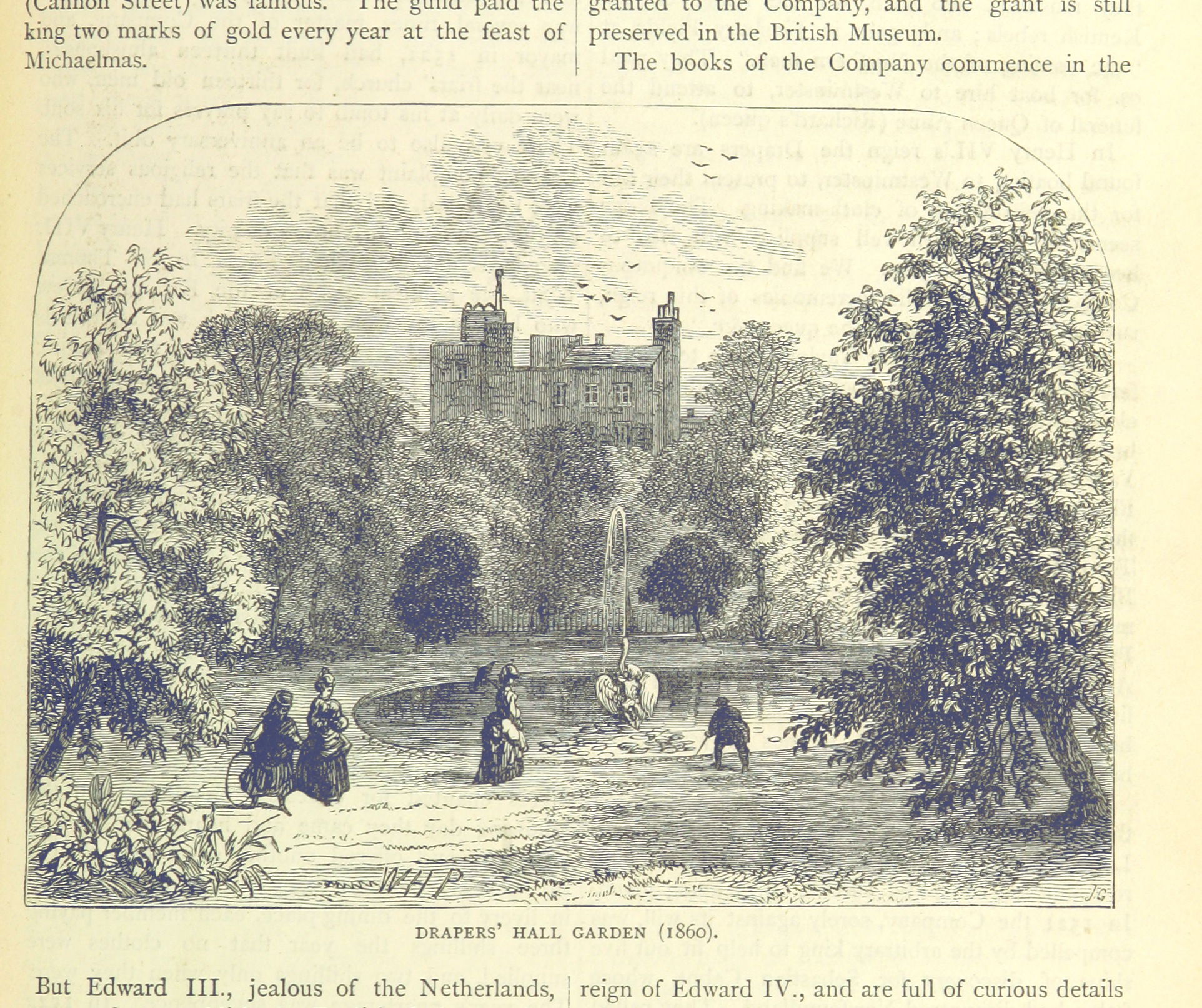
Drapers' Hall Garden, 1860

Before the building of a comprehensive sewage system in London during the late 19th century, the site had been largely undeveloped since Roman times as it was waterlogged by tributaries of the River Walbrook. During the period from the first occupation by the Drapers' Company in 1544, it was a market garden and place of recreation. After the Great Fire of London, the west side was built over. Over the following 200 years, the remainder of the gardens remained a largely open space but were finally built over in 1873 (except for a small patch to the east of Throgmorton Avenue, now the gardens of Drapers' Hall). The buildings standing within the boundary of the Drapers' Company property line on the west side of Throgmorton Avenue were demolished to make way for the Seifert Tower.

== Seifert's Drapers' Gardens ==
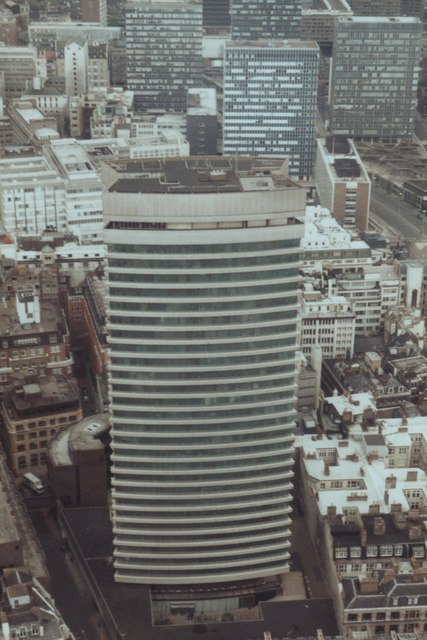
Drapers' Gardens skyscraper in 1983

The original Drapers' Gardens was a skyscraper in the City of London, designed by architect Richard Seifert. It stood at 100 metres (328 ft) tall and had 30 storeys. It was completed in 1967 and demolished in 2007 by Keltbray due to a redevelopment plan scheme by the Royal Bank of Scotland that was approved by the City of London in 2002 to build a shorter, 75 metres (246 ft) tall, but larger in floor area, office building in its place.

After completion, the building was leased by the National Provincial Bank and continued to be used by the successor National Westminster Bank until the 1990s. It was used as overflow office space for the bank's nearby head office at 41 Lothbury.

There were those who cited the building as a fine example of its period and one of the few genuinely well-designed towers of the 1960s. Seifert, its designer as well as the architect of Tower 42, described the Drapers' Gardens skyscraper as his proudest achievement.

When the tower was demolished in 2007, it was the tallest building to have ever been demolished in the United Kingdom. As of 2018, it remains the joint-tallest demolished building in the country, alongside the subsequent Southwark Towers, demolished the year after Drapers' Gardens.

== New development ==
During the 1980s, it became apparent that Seifert's building was not suitable as a modern office space. The sole occupant, National Westminster Bank, sought to end its lease and there was a weak market for replacement tenancies. The new office development was designed by Foggo Associates. The replacement Drapers' Gardens is 75 metres (246 ft) tall with 16 floors, three roof terraces and a pocket park. At 270,000 square feet (25,000 m^{2}) it has more floor space than the Seifert's design. The building's stepped profile was developed in response to local and long-distance views, and landscaped roof gardens were to provide amenity space for the building's occupiers.

The developers were Exemplar Developments and Canary Wharf Developments. It was completed in Autumn 2009. The development was then sold on to Evans Randall in 2010 for £242.5 million. Most of the floors of the building were originally taken by Macquarie, however BlackRock subsequently made a higher offer.

Between the demolition and rebuilding, an archaeological dig by Pre-Construct Archaeology Ltd found Roman remains dating from 63 AD to 383 AD. These included a well with 19 metal vessels in an exceptional state of preservation, a ruler, and the skull of a bear.

== See also ==
- List of tallest buildings and structures in London
