= Barnenez =

Archaeological site in Plouezoc'h, France

Cairn of Barnenez
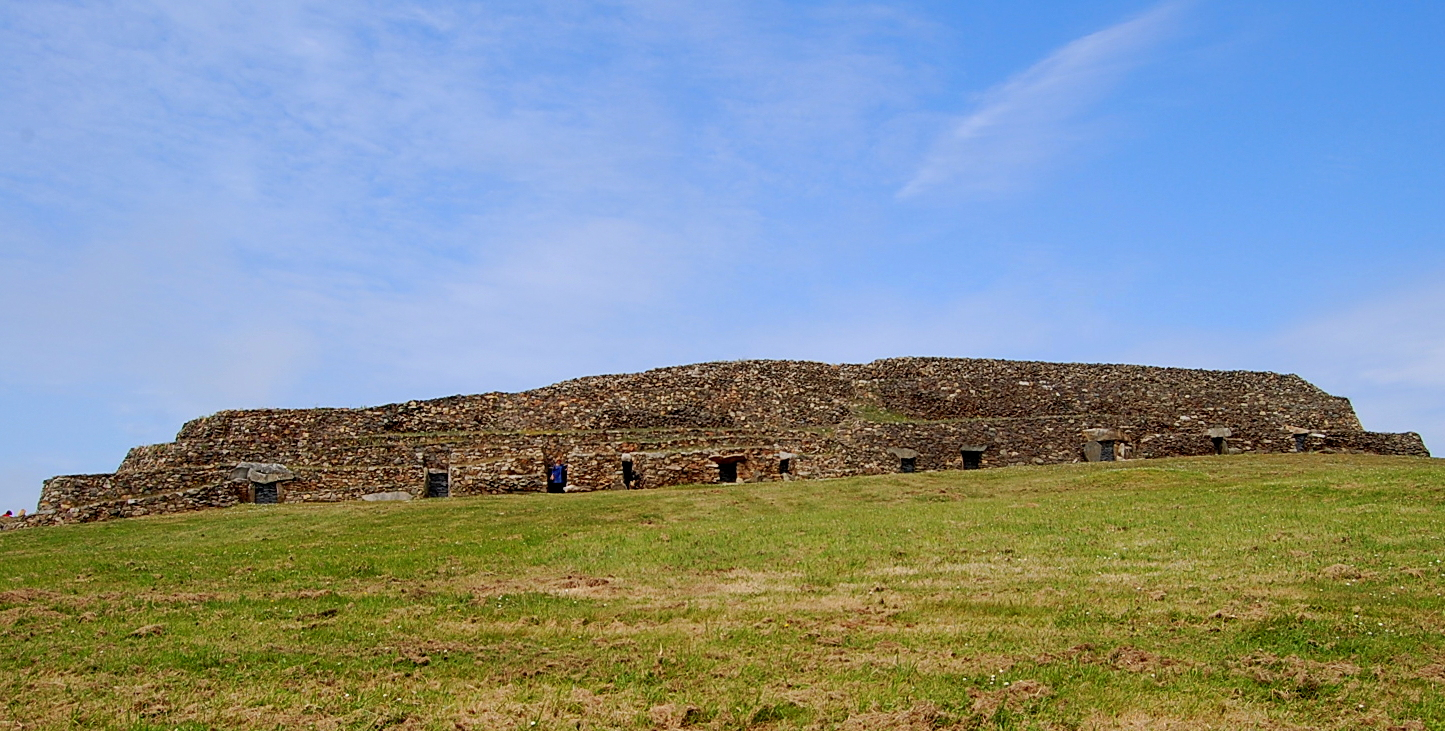

- Location within Brittany

General information
- Location: Finistère, Brittany, France
- Coordinates: 48°40′03″N 03°51′31″W
- Construction started: c. 4850 BC
- Completed: c. 4000 BC

Height
- Height: 8 meters

Dimensions
- Diameter: 72 meters

Technical details
- Material: Stone

The Cairn of Barnenez (also: Barnenez Tumulus, Barnenez Mound; in Breton Karn Barnenez; in French: Cairn de Barnenez or Tumulus de Barnenez) is a Neolithic monument located near Plouezoc'h, on the Kernéléhen peninsula in northern Finistère, Brittany, France. It dates to the early Neolithic, around 4000 BC. Along with the Tumulus of Bougon and Locmariaquer megaliths, also located in Great West France, it is one of the earliest megalithic monuments in Europe and one of the oldest man-made structures in the world. It is also remarkable for the presence of megalithic art.

== History ==
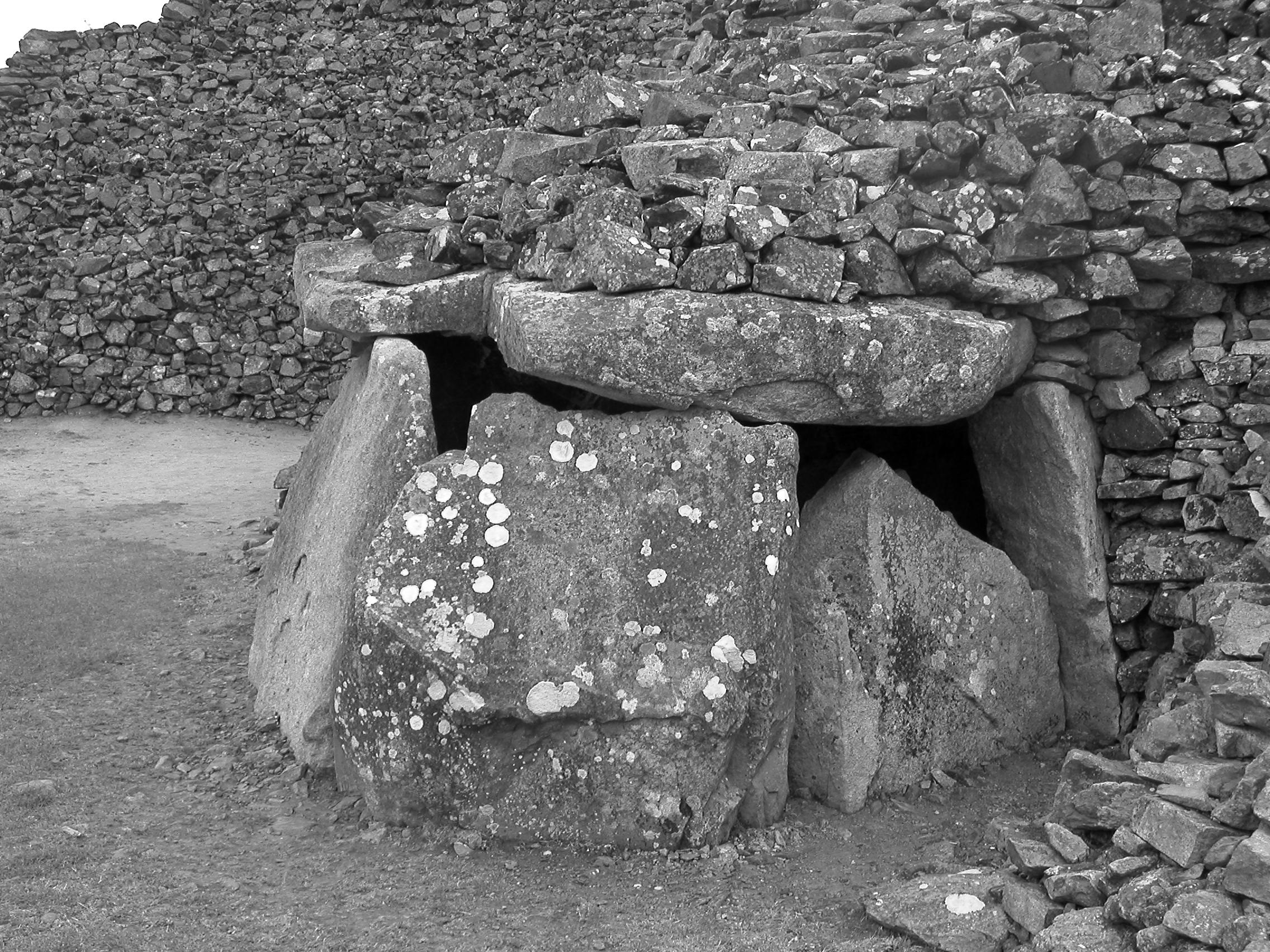
One of the chambers, exposed by 20th century quarrying

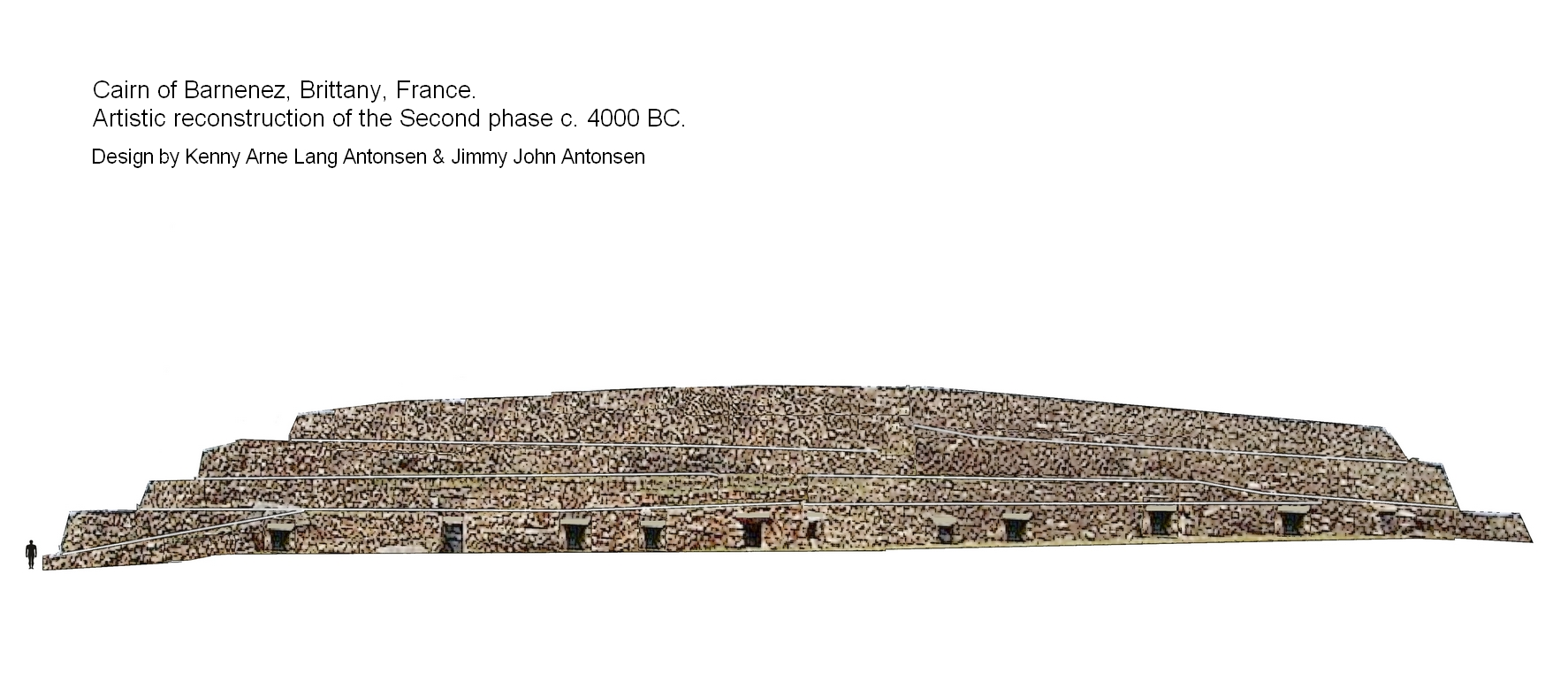
Artistic reconstruction of the cairn, c. 4000 BC

=== Dates ===
Radiocarbon dates indicate that the first phase of the monument was erected between 4850 and 4250 BC, and the second phase between 4450 and 4000 BC.

=== Secondary use ===
Pottery found in and around the monument indicates that it underwent a period of reuse in the Bronze Age, in the 3rd millennium BC.

=== Recognition as an ancient monument ===
The cairn was first mapped in 1807, in the context of the Napoleonic cadaster. Its first scientific recognition took place in the context of an academic congress in Morlaix in 1850, when it was classified as a tumulus.

=== Quarry damage ===
Privately owned until the 1950s, the cairn was used as a quarry for paving stones. This activity, which threatened to destroy the monument, was only halted after the discovery of several of its chambers in the 1950s. The local community then took control of the site.

=== Restoration and excavation ===
The cairn was restored between 1954 and 1968. At the same time, vegetation was removed from the mound and systematic excavation took place in and around the monument.

== The monument ==
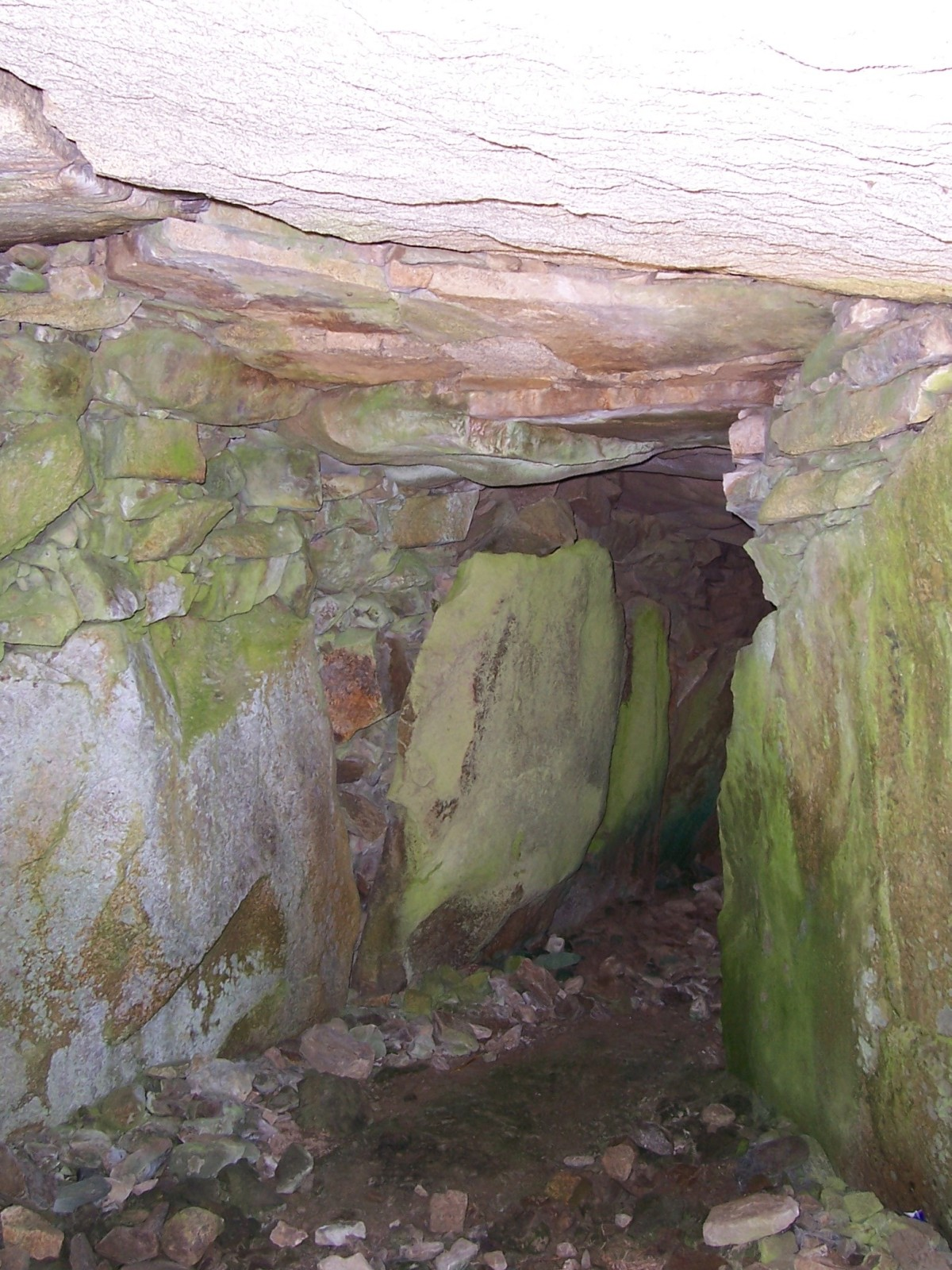
One of the passages

=== The mound ===
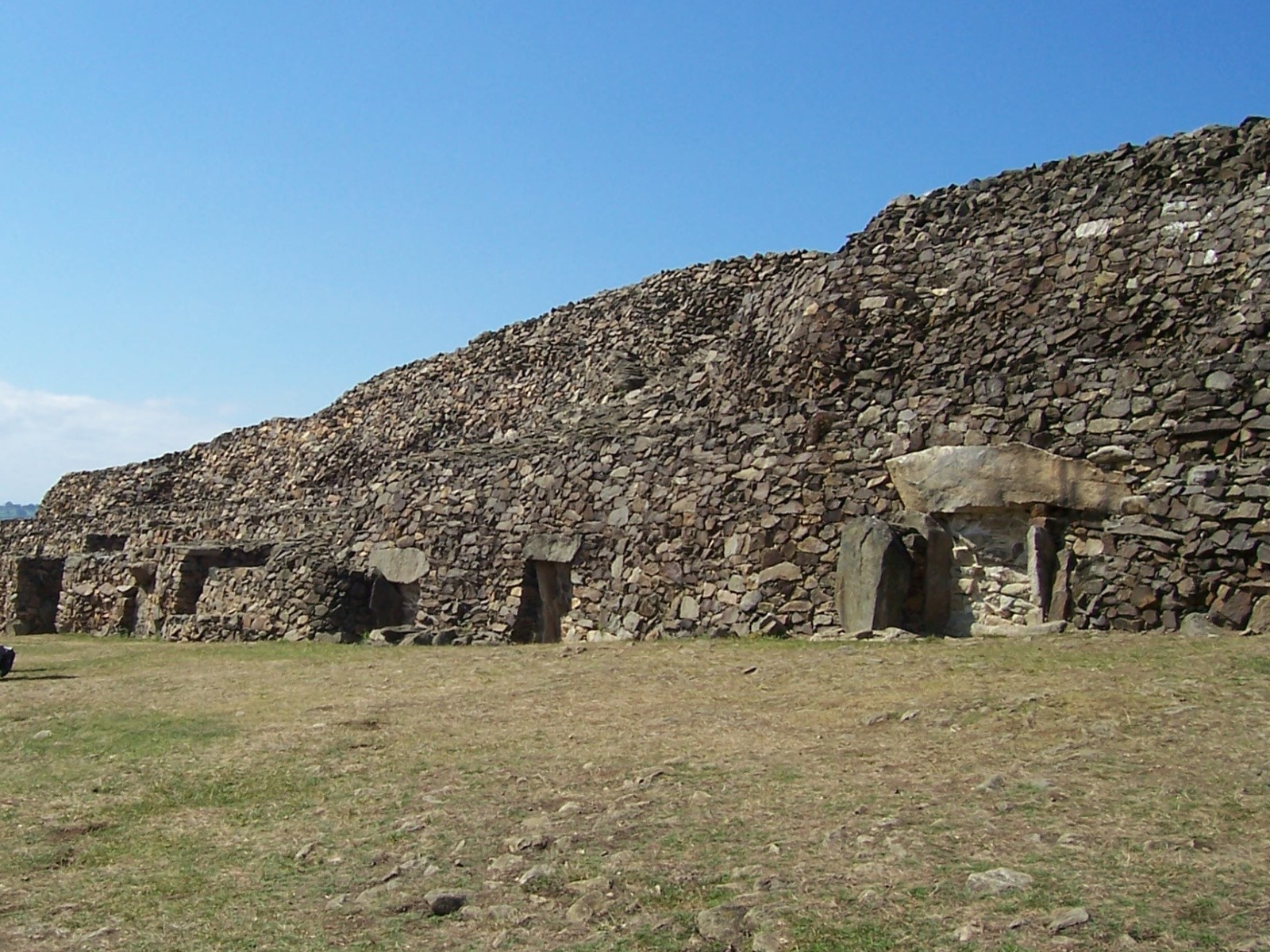
Front of the Barnenez cairn

Today, the Barnenez cairn is 72 m long, up to 25 m wide, and over 8 m high. It is built of 13,000 to 14,000 tons of stone. It contains 11 chambers entered by separate passages. The mound has steep facades and a stepped profile. Several internal walls either represent earlier facades or served the stability of the structure. The cairn consists of relatively small blocks of stone, with only the chambers being truly megalithic in character. The monument overlooks the Bay of Morlaix, probably a fertile coastal plain at the time of its erection.

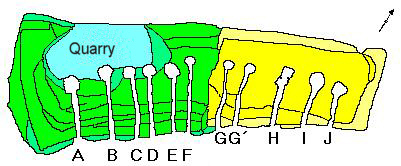
Simplified plan. Cairn 1 marked in yellow, Cairn 2 in green.

=== Construction phases ===
The monument is the result of at least two phases of building.

==== Cairn 1, before 4500 BC ====
In a first phase, a slightly trapezoidal mound of 32 m by 9 to 13 m was erected. It contained 5 chambers and was surrounded by a double kerb. The first phase favoured the use of dolerite.

==== Cairn 2, c. 4200 – c. 4000 BC ====
In a second phase, an extension with six further chambers was added in the west. At the same time, Cairn 1 was enveloped in a wider and taller structure; its passages had to be extended. More granite was used in this phase.

=== The chambers ===
The 11 chambers of the Barnenez cairn are of the type known as Dolmen à couloir in French archaeological terminology. The term translates roughly as "passage grave". They are built of large slabs of slate and granite. Originally, all the chambers were entirely enclosed by the mound. The fact that several of them are partially exposed now is the result of modern quarrying.

Each of the 11 chambers is reached from the southeast via a long narrow passage (7–12 m long). They are arranged parallel to each other. Shapes and construction techniques differ slightly.

In nine cases, narrow passages lead to corbelled chambers. Normally, the corbel vault rests on orthostats, in one chamber it actually sits on the ground, forming a true tholos. The passages have slab-built or dry stone walls and are covered with slabs. One of the chambers has a dry-stone vaulted ante-chamber.

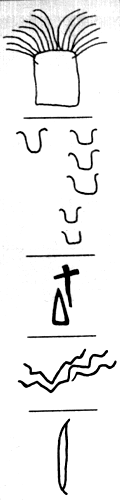
Examples of the carved symbols

=== Logistics ===
One cubic metre of the Barnenez cairn contains 1,500 kg of stone. It is estimated that the quarrying, fashioning, transport and construction of such an amount represents about four work days for a single worker (assuming a 10-hour day). The original monument, Cairn 1, had a volume of about 2,000 cubic metres; it is built of 1,000 tons of granite and 3,000 tons of dolerite. It would thus have required 15,000 to 20,000 working days; in other words, it would have taken 200 workers three months to erect Cairn 1 alone. In its final form, the Barnenez mound is nearly three times as big as the first phase.

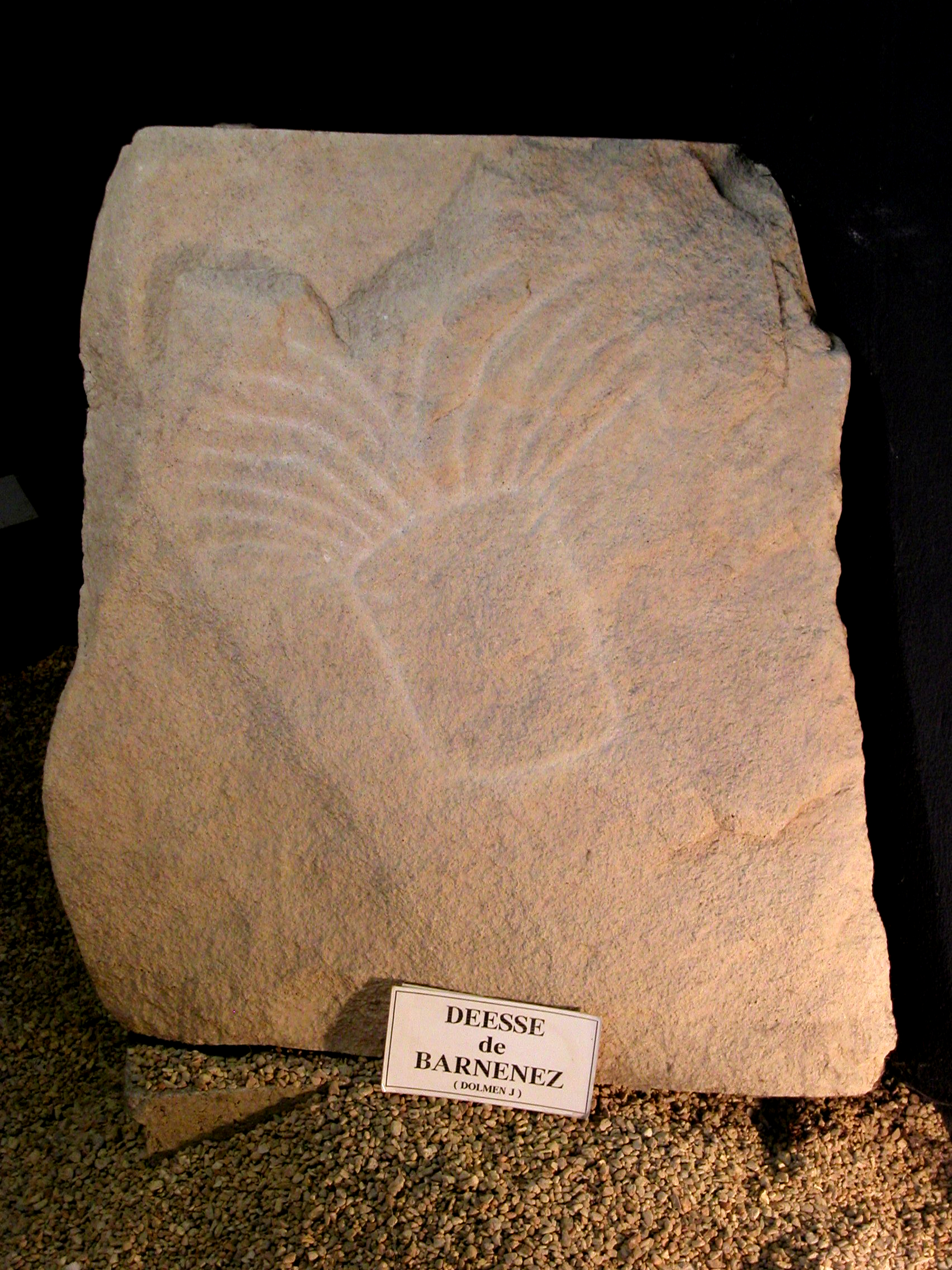
Reproduction of the "Dolmen Goddess" of Barnenez

=== Engraved symbols ===
Engraved symbols occur in several of the chambers and passages. They depict bows, axes, wave symbols or snakes and a repeated U-shaped sign. One of the carved slabs is in secondary use; it was originally part of a different structure, an interesting parallel to the situation in several other such monuments, including Gavrinis.

The symbols on the engraved blocks resemble those found in other megalithic monuments in Brittany; in broader terms they belong to the cultural phenomenon described as megalithic art. One of the recurring symbols is sometimes interpreted as an anthropomorphic depiction (the so-called "Dolmen Goddess").

=== Finds ===
==== Material from the original period of use ====
Only Cairn 2, namely chambers A, C and D, contained Neolithic finds at the time of excavation. They included pottery, polished stone axes (of dolerite), flint blades and arrowheads.

==== Bronze Age pottery ====
Pottery shards found outside the monument indicate that it was reused in the Bronze Age (3rd millennium BC). A copper dagger and a barbed arrowhead are of Chalcolithic date.

== Comparable monuments ==
Similar, possibly contemporary, monuments are known at 22 other locations in France and on Jersey. Breton examples are Larcuste-Colpo, Le Bono, Petit Mont, Ty-Floc´h, Gavrinis, Île Carn, Ploudalmézeau and Guennoc (I´ile Gaignoc – sometimes spelt Guénioc) off the shore at Landéda. Those located on islands are generally better preserved. Chamber 3 B at Guennoc contains a small standing stone near the entrance.

== Exhibition ==
An exhibition in the modern entrance building explains the results of scientific excavation and displays some objects from the site.

== See also ==
- Megalithic art
- Gavrinis
- Bougon
