= Gavrinis =

French island and megalithic monument

- Gavriniz (Breton)
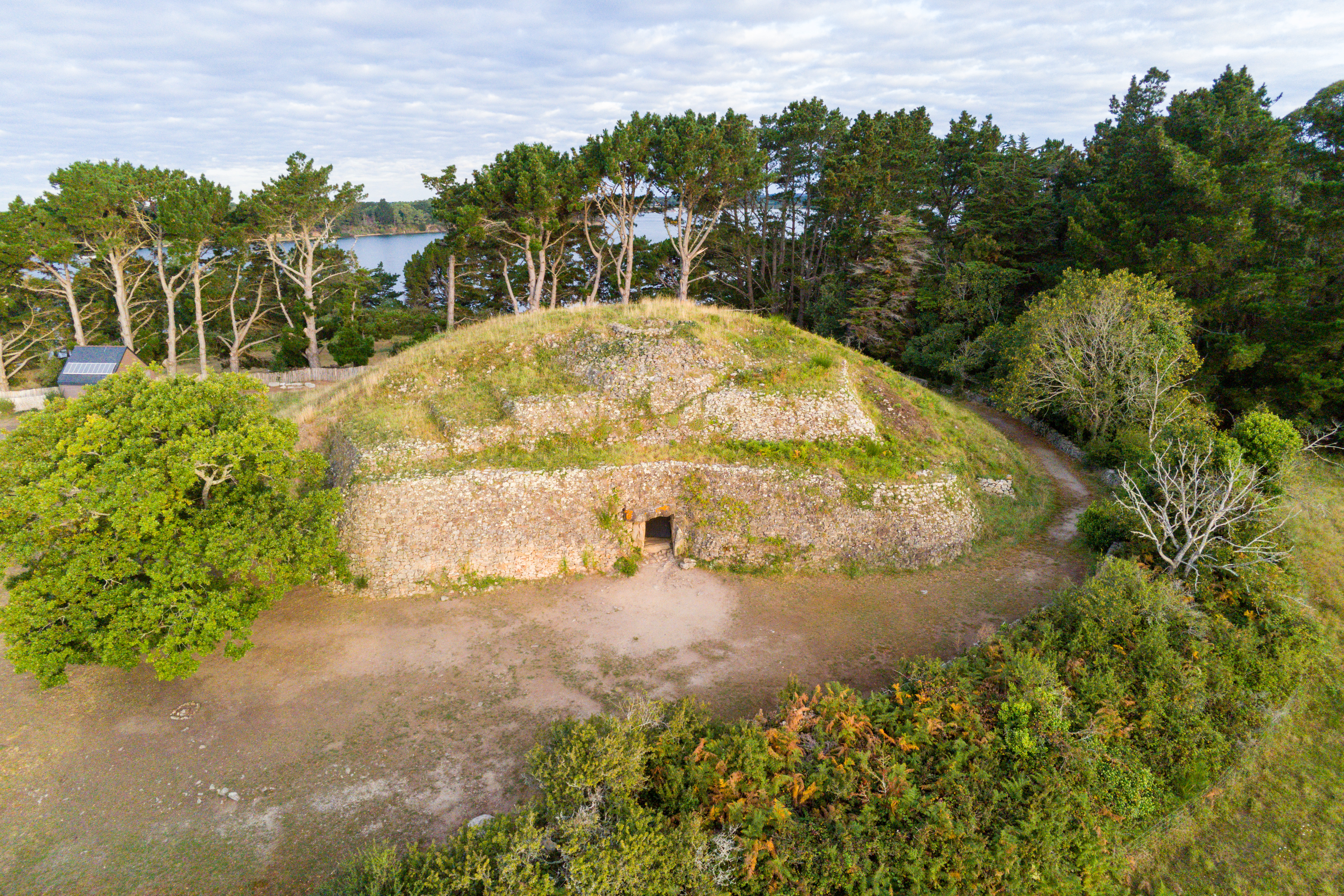
- Gavrinis tomb from above

- Location within Brittany
- 47°34′26″N 02°53′52″W
- Type: passage tomb
- Periods: Neolithic
- Location: Morbihan, Brittany, France

History
- Built: 4200–4000 BC

Gavrinis (Breton: Gavriniz) is a small island in the Gulf of Morbihan in Brittany, France. It contains the Gavrinis tomb, a Neolithic passage tomb built around 4200–4000 BC, making it one of the world's oldest surviving buildings. Stones inside the passage and chamber are covered in megalithic art. It is likened to other Neolithic passage tombs such as Barnenez in Brittany and Newgrange in Ireland.

== Geography ==
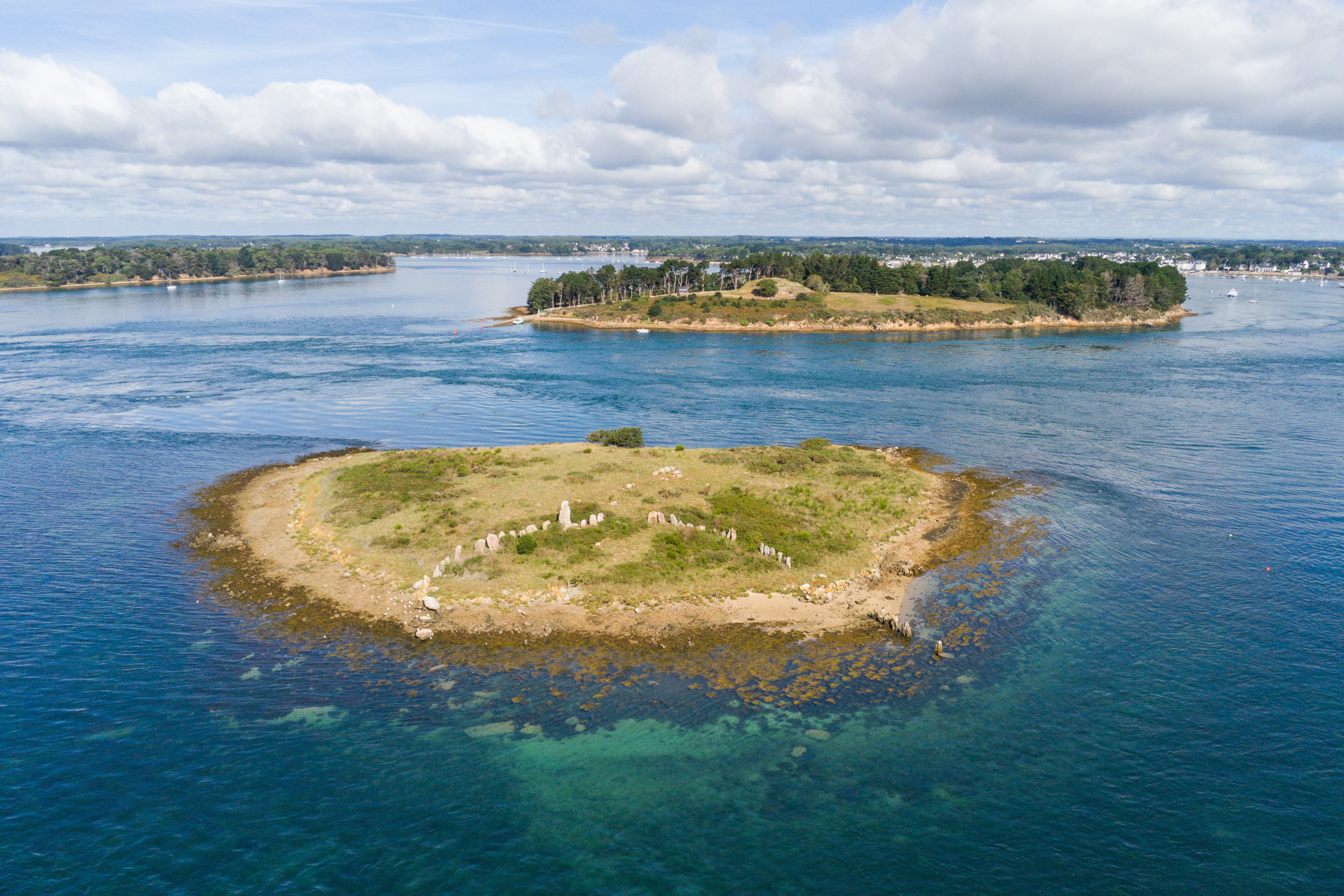
The island of Gavrinis, with Er Lannic island in the foreground

Reachable by boat from the town of Larmor-Baden near the opening of Morbihan Gulf to the Atlantic Ocean, Gavrinis is an uninhabited granite rock outcrop of 750 × 400 m. Its highest point dominates much of the surrounding area.

== Name ==
The name Gavrinis is popularly believed to be derived from the Breton words gavr (goat) and enez (island), suggesting a meaning of "goat island". This is probably a false etymology. In documents dating from 1184 and 1202, the island is named Guirv Enes and Guerg Enes, respectively. The old Breton word Guerg is not related to gavr, but to parallels such as Welsh gwery, or Old Irish ferg, signifying "wrath".

== Gavrinis passage tomb ==
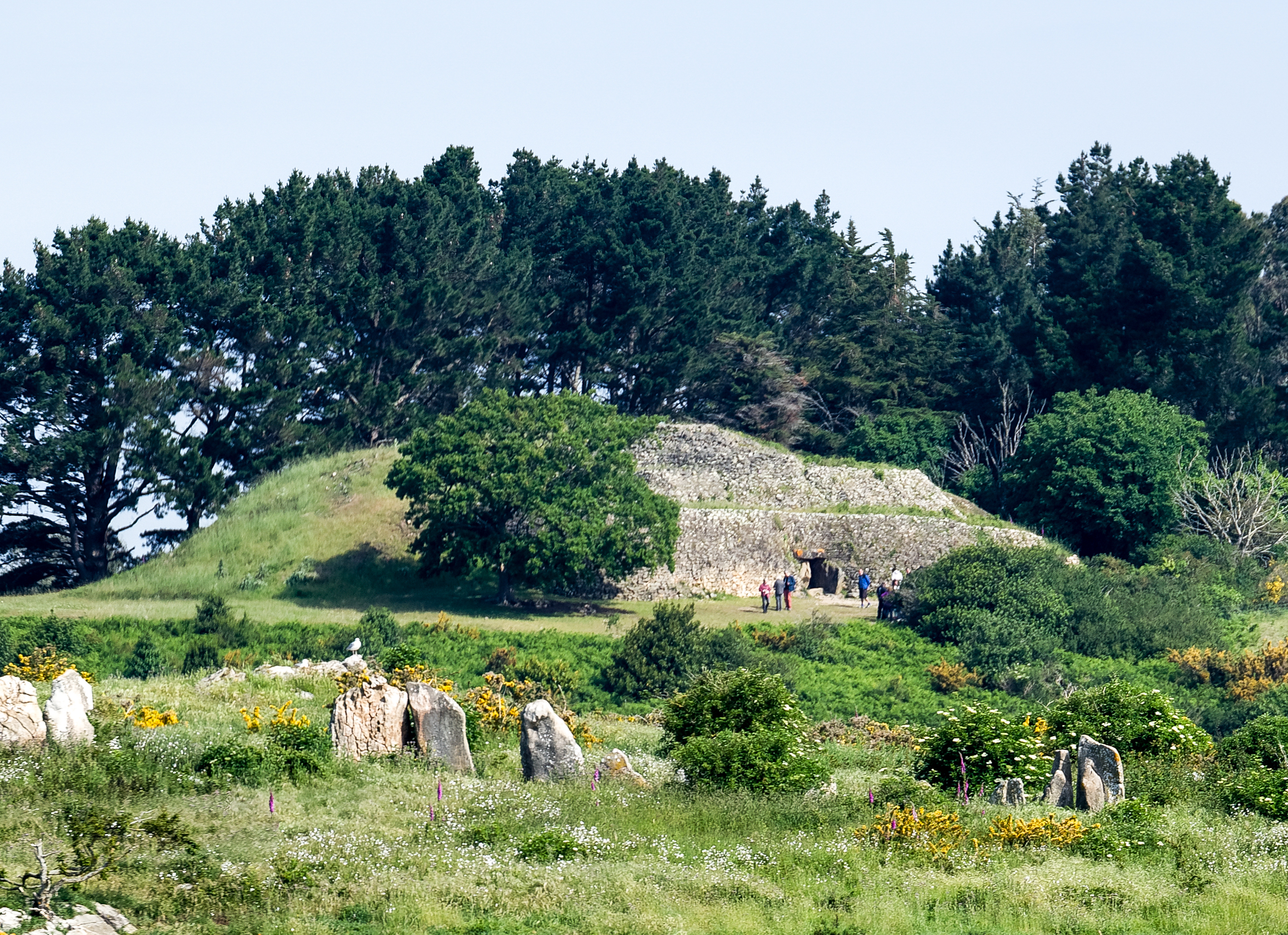
Gavrinis passage tomb

=== Importance ===
The island is famous for its important passage grave, a megalithic monument from the Neolithic period, belonging to the same broad context as the Breton megaliths of Carnac and Locmariaquer, and closely connected with the monuments at Brú na Boínne (Ireland) and Maes Howe (Orkney). At the time of its construction, c. 3500 BC, the island was still connected with the mainland. The rich internal decorations make Gavrinis one of the major treasuries of European megalithic art. The tomb is also remarkable for the care taken in its construction and its good preservation.

=== History of research ===
The first excavations took place in 1835, when the internal chamber was discovered. Further research was undertaken by the archaeologist Zacharie Le Rouzic who began restoration work around 1930. Further works took place in the 1960s and 1970s. Charles-Tanguy Leroux, former director of Breton Antiquities, undertook studies and consolidation works in the 1980s. Further excavation is in the planning stages.

=== Date ===
The tomb was built c. 4200–4000 BC. Its use ceased around 3000 BC, when the entrance was sealed. At that time, the light wooden structures cladding its entrance were burnt, after which part of the mound collapsed, obscuring and blocking the passage. A layer of windblown sand transformed the monument into a simple hillock.

=== The cairn ===
The stone mound has a diameter of about 50 m. The mass of stones forming the cairn is internally structured by a series of walls, subdividing it into separate "ranks". It is a characteristic example of Neolithic dry stone architecture.

=== The chamber ===
The mound covers a single rectangular (nearly square) slab-built burial chamber, located at the centre of the mound and measuring about 2.5 m across. The chamber is built of about 50 carefully placed slabs. The biggest of these is the ceiling slab which weighs nearly 17 tons. Such simple dolmen-type chambers, reached by passages, were very common in Brittany between 4500 and 3000 BC. At the same time, similar monuments were constructed in Normandy and Poitou, in Ireland, Britain, and the Iberian Peninsula.

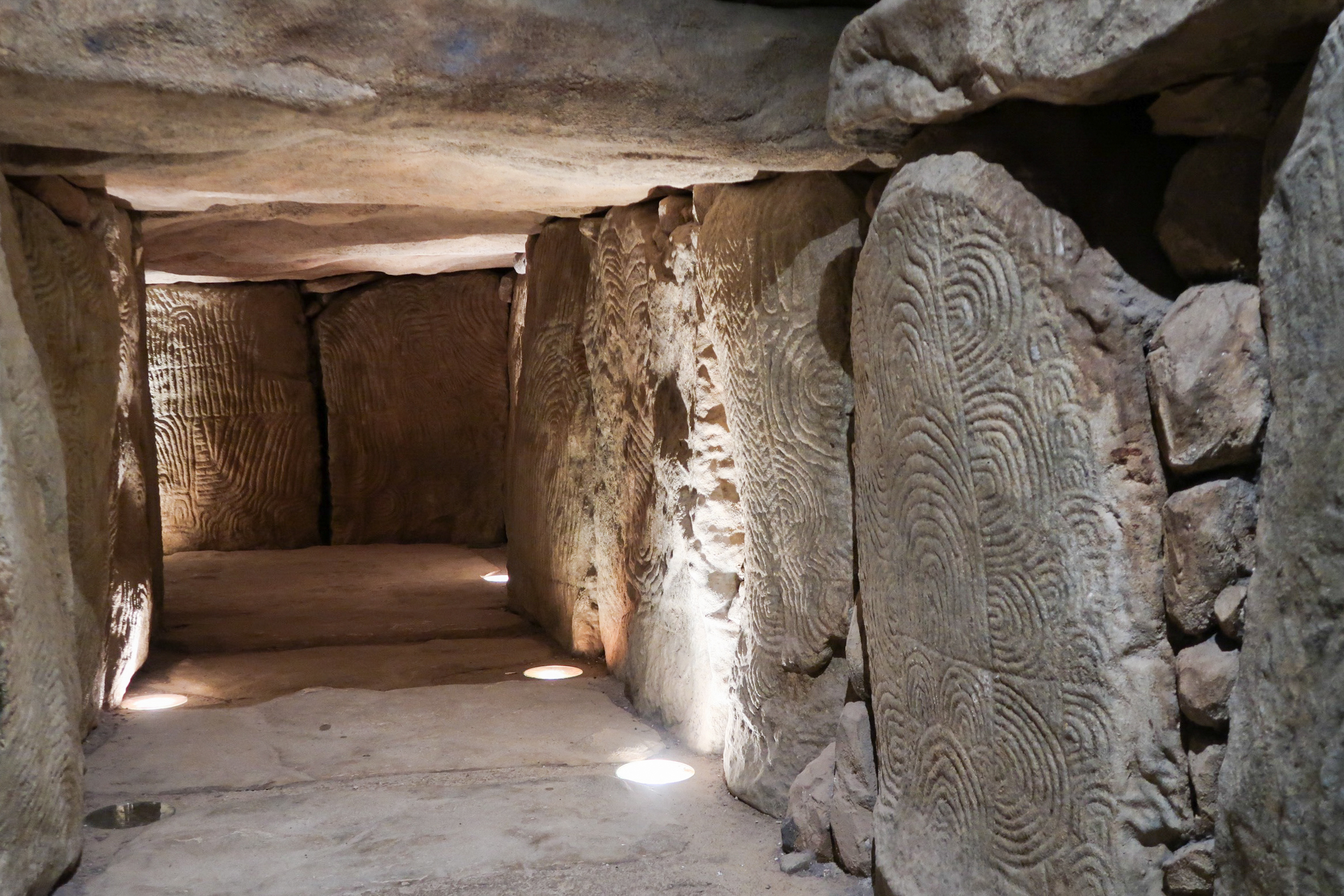
Replica of part of Gavrinis passage in Bougon Museum

=== The passage and its art ===
The chamber is reached from outside by a 14 m-long corridor or passage. Of the 29 orthostat slabs that form the sides of the passage, 23 are decorated with carved symbols and patterns. Some of the symbols appear to represent non-abstract objects, such as axes and croziers or staffs. A common horn-like motif may symbolise cattle, and a shape conventionally called the shield may be a very stylised human figure. More abstract motifs include zigzag lines, lozenges, and snake-like lines.

=== Reuse of stones ===
In 1984, it was discovered that the external side of some slabs, now covered by cairn material, is also decorated, but in a different style from their internal face. This decoration must have been applied before the cairn was erected. Archaeologists suspect that at least a number of those slabs may be in secondary use, having formed part of earlier monuments elsewhere. Most strikingly, the top of the chamber ceiling slab bore the depiction of a bull, the horns of a further animal, and a motif known from other monuments that has often been interpreted as an axe (Twohig 1981), but which has also been interpreted as a representation of a whale, and thus as a "mythic animal" (Whittle 2000). The slab can be joined with the ceiling stones of two other monuments, the Table des Marchands dolmen and the Er Vinglé tomb, at Locmariaquer, at a distance of 4 km. The three slabs appear to have once formed a massive 14 m standing stone, similar to the great broken menhir of Locmariaquer, which broke or was broken, to be reused as three ceiling slabs, its decorations deliberately obscured.

== Gallery ==
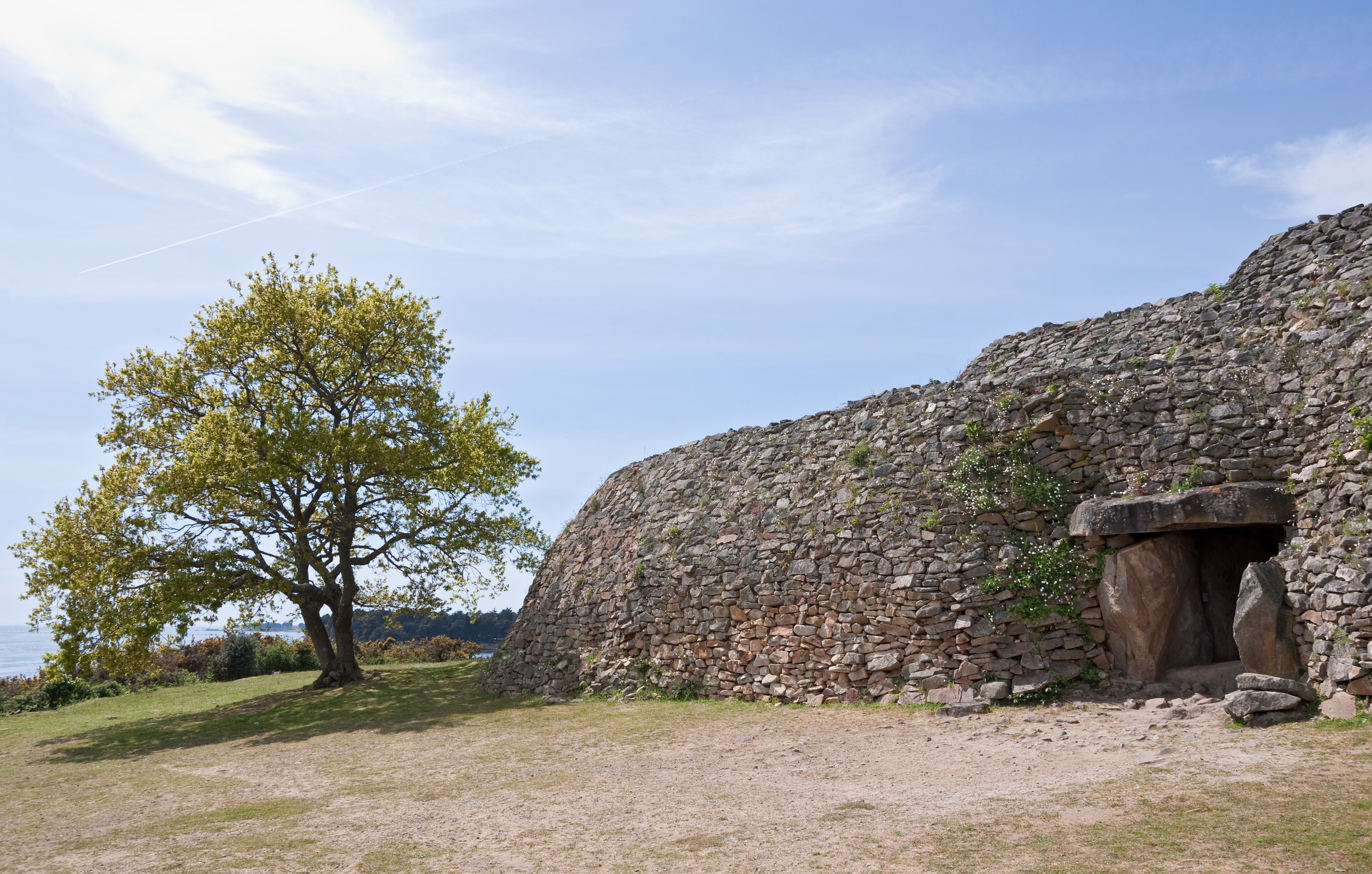
The entrance to the Gavrinis passage grave

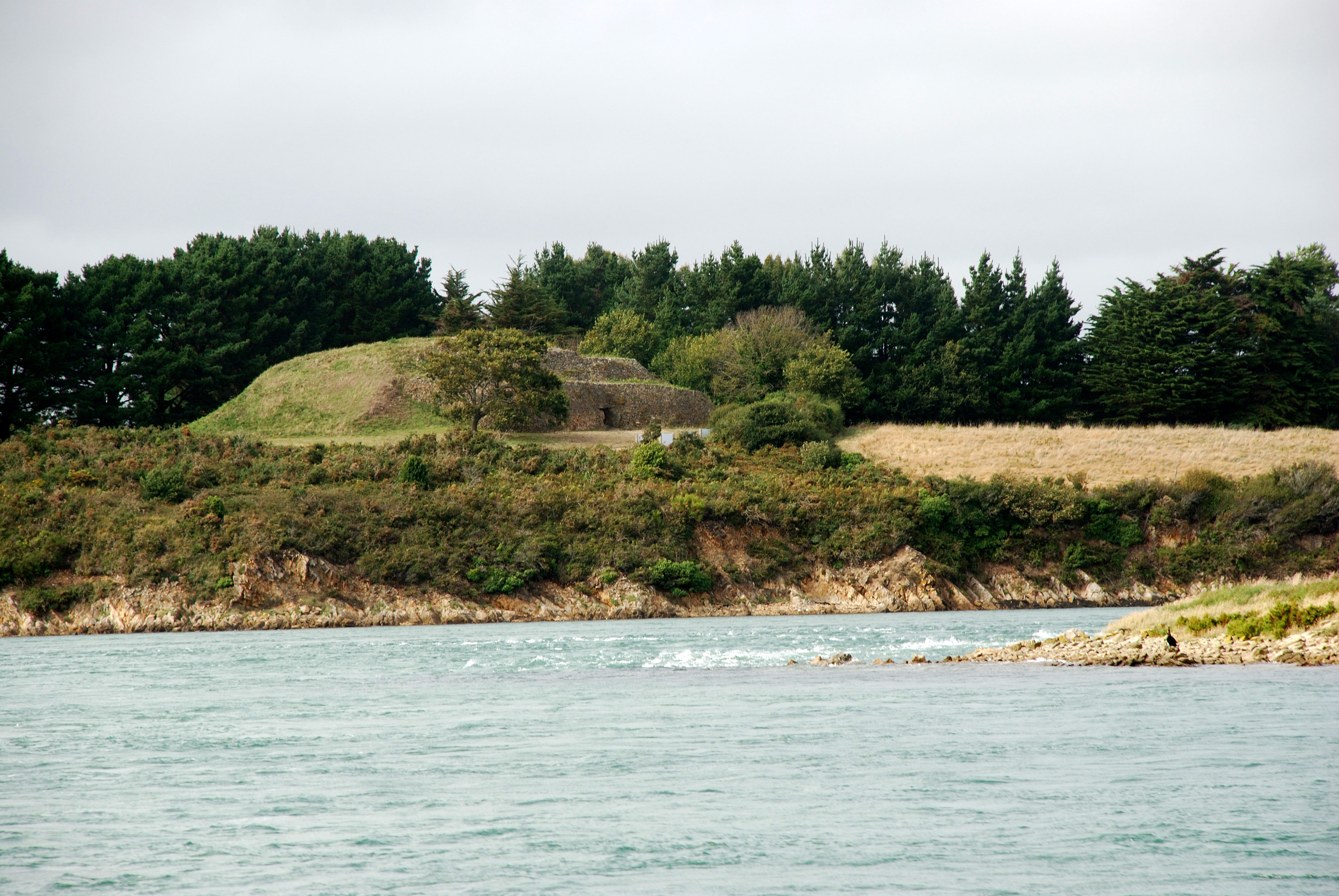
Gavrinis seen from the water

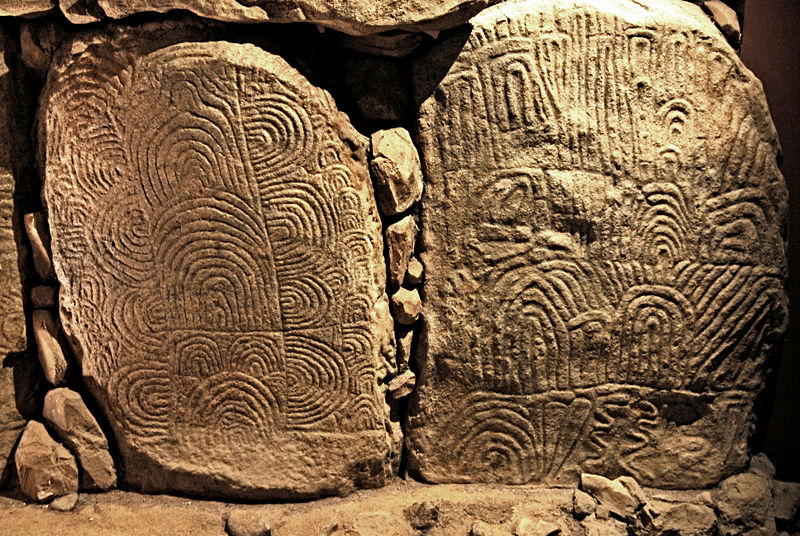
Decorated slabs from the Gavrinis passage (replica in Bougon Museum)

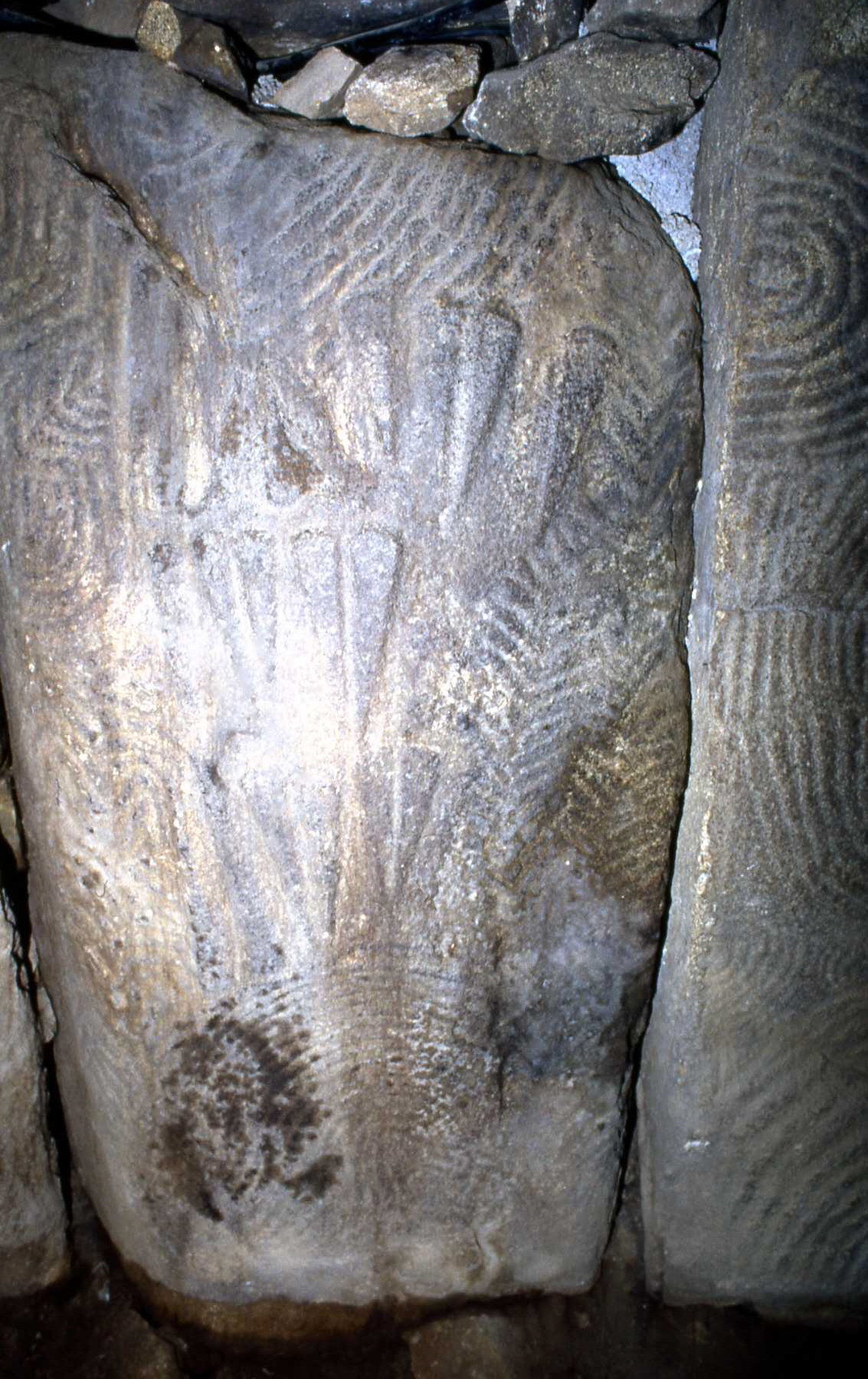
Decorated slab with carved depictions of axes

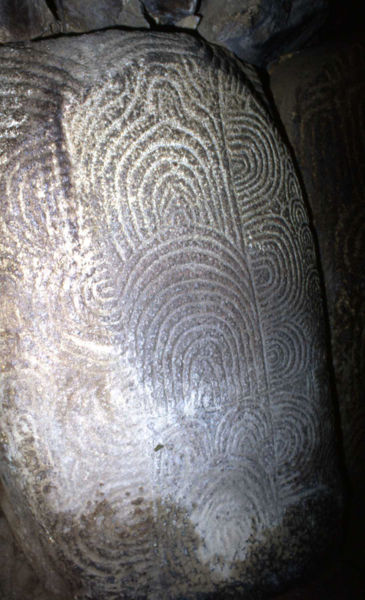
A decorated slab within the passage, note the anthropomorphic "shield" motif on top

== Replica ==
A replica of part of the Gavrinis passage with its decorated slabs can be visited in the museum at the megalithic necropolis of Bougon (Deux-Sèvres).

== Bibliography ==
- Le Roux, Charles-Tanguy (2006). Gavrinis et les mégalithes du golfe du Morbihan. Éditions Jean-Paul Gisserot.
- L'Helgouac'H, J. (1983). "Les Idoles qu'on abat". Bulletin de la Société Polymatique du Morbihan. 110: 57–68.
- Le Roux, Charles-Tanguy (1985). "New excavations at Gavrinis". Antiquity. 59 (227): 183–187. doi:10.1017/S0003598X00057240.
- Le Roux, Charles-Tanguy (1985). "Gavrinis et les îles du Morbihan". Guides archéologiques de la France. Paris: Ministère de la Culture.
- Cassen, S.; L'Helgouac'H, J. (1992). "Du Symbole de la crosse: chronologie, répartition et interprétation". XVIIème colloque interrégional sur le Néolithique: Vannes 1990, actes. 5. Rennes: RAO: 223–235.
- Twohig, E. S. (1981). The Megalithic Art of Western Europe. Oxford: Clarendon Press.
- Whittle, Alisdair (2000). "Very Like a Whale: Menhirs, Motifs and Myths in the Mesolithic-Neolithic Transition of Northwest Europe". Cambridge Archaeological Journal. 10 (2): 243–259. doi:10.1017/S0959774300000093.

== See also ==
- Table des Marchand (Locmariaquer)
- Newgrange
- Maes Howe
- Barnenez
- Bougon
- Knockroe Passage Tomb
- Prehistoric Europe
