= Macdonald baronets of Sleat (1625) =

Escutcheon of the Macdonald baronets of Sleat

The Macdonald baronetcy, later Bosville Macdonald Baronetcy, of Sleat (also Slate) in the Isle of Skye, County of Inverness, was created in the Baronetage of Nova Scotia on 14 July 1625 for Donald Macdonald. The 9th baronet was created Baron Macdonald in 1776.

According to a decision by the Court of Session in June 1910, the children born before the 1803 marriage of the third Baron Macdonald were legitimate according to Scottish Law. However, this decision was only valid regarding the Nova Scotia baronetcy and not the Irish barony. As a result, the third Baron's rightful successor in the Baronetcy was his eldest son Alexander William Robert Bosville (the de jure twelfth Baronet). He had assumed by Royal licence the surname of Bosville in 1832 and had in 1847 inherited his father's Bosville estates in Yorkshire by Act of Parliament. His grandson, the de jure fourteenth Baronet, was recognised in the Baronetcy according to the aforementioned 1910 decision by the Court of Session.

The title holder as of 2026, the 17th baronet, is chief of Clan Macdonald of Sleat.

On 23 December 1716 the fourth baronet, Sir Donald MacDonald, was created Lord Sleat in the Jacobite peerage, and for this reason the current Baronet is the titular 14th Lord Sleat.

== Macdonald baronets, of Sleat (1625) ==
- Sir Donald Gorme Og Macdonald, 1st Baronet (died 1643)
- Sir James Mor Macdonald, 2nd Baronet (died 1678)
- Sir Donald Macdonald, 3rd Baronet (died 1695)
- Sir Donald Macdonald, 4th Baronet (died 1718)
- Sir Donald Macdonald, 5th Baronet (c. 1697–1720)
- Sir James Macdonald, 6th Baronet (died 1723)
- Sir Alexander Macdonald, 7th Baronet (1711–1746)
- Sir James Macdonald, 8th Baronet (c. 1742–1766)
- Sir Alexander Macdonald, 9th Baronet (c. 1745–1795) (created Baron Macdonald in 1776)

== Barons Macdonald (1776) ==
- Alexander Macdonald, 1st Baron Macdonald, 9th Baronet (c. 1745–1795)
- Alexander Wentworth Macdonald, 2nd Baron Macdonald, 10th Baronet (1773–1824)
- Godfrey Macdonald, 3rd Baron Macdonald of Slate, 11th Baronet (1775–1832)

== Bosville Macdonald baronets, of Sleat (1625); reverted 1832 ==
Bosville arms, quartered 2nd and 3rd with the arms of Macdonald of Sleat in the Bosville Macdonald escutcheon

- Sir Alexander William Robert Bosville Macdonald, de jure 12th Baronet (1800–1847)
- Sir Godfrey Wentworth Bayard Bosville, de jure 13th Baronet (1826–1865)
- Sir Alexander Wentworth Macdonald Bosville Macdonald, 14th Baronet (1865–1933) (recognised in baronetcy in 1910). With this revival of the 1625 title, granted precedence as second of the Nova Scotia baronets at the time, the holder became the premier baronet. To 1908, the Gordon baronets of Letterfourie, created 28 May 1625, had been premier.
- Sir Godfrey Middleton Bosville Macdonald, 15th Baronet (1887–1951)
- Sir Alexander Somerled Angus Bosville Macdonald, 16th Baronet (1917–1958)
- Sir Ian Godfrey Bosville Macdonald, 17th Baronet (born 1947)

The heir apparent is the present holder's son Somerled Alexander Bosville Macdonald, Younger of Sleat (born 1976).
