= Sir Alexander Macdonald, 7th Baronet =

Scottish Chief of Clan Macdonald of Sleat

Sir Alexander Macdonald Bt
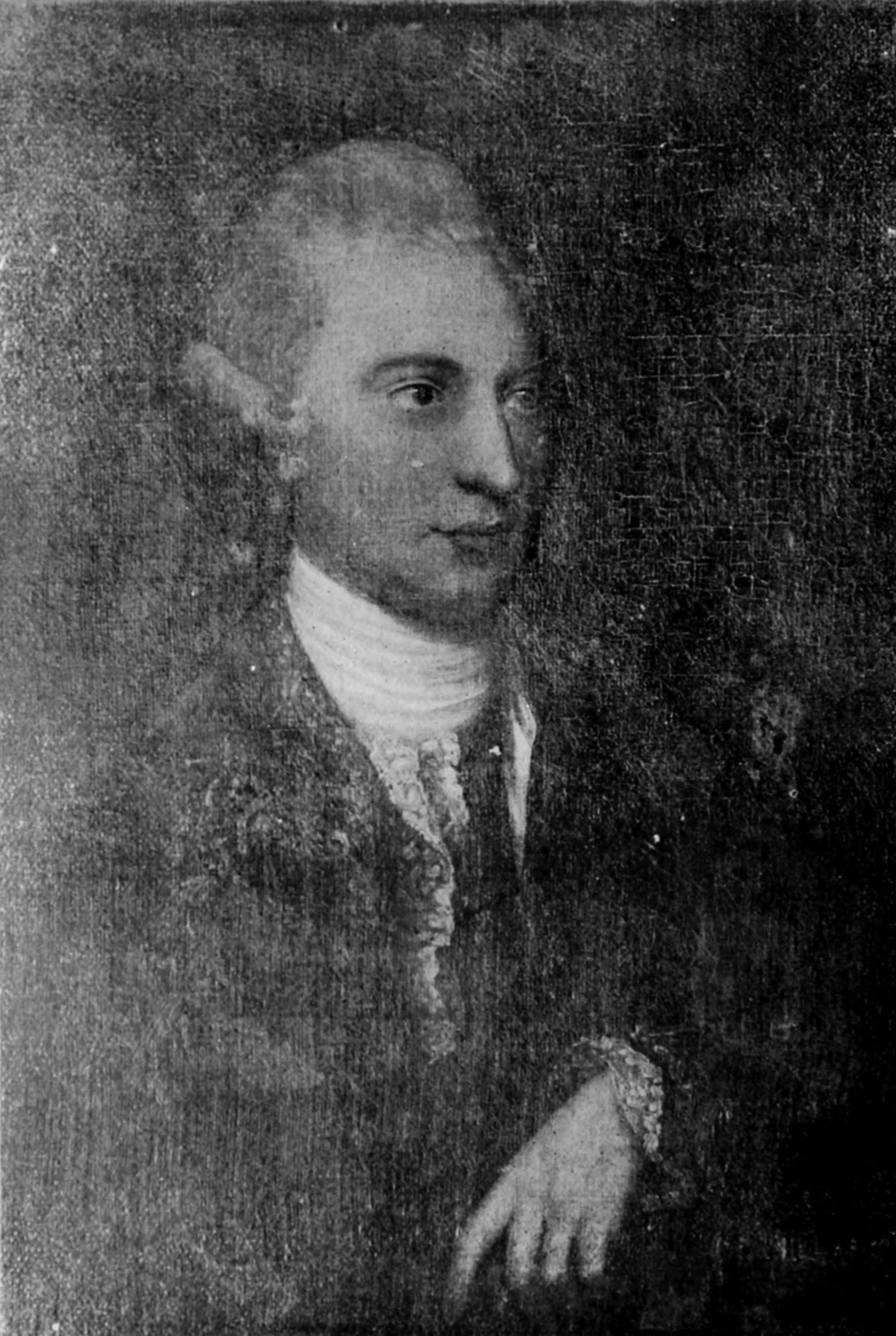
- Portrait from The Clan Donald, by A. and A. Macdonald, published in 1900.
- Born: 1711
- Died: 23 November 1746 (aged 34–35); Berneray, Outer Hebrides, Scotland
- Spouse(s): Anne, Lady Ogilvy (m. 1733; died 1735) Lady Margaret Montgomerie (m. 1739; died 1746)
- Children: Sir James Macdonald, 8th Baronet; Alexander Macdonald, 1st Baron Macdonald; Sir Archibald Macdonald, 1st Baronet
- Parent(s): Sir James Macdonald, 6th Baronet; Janet MacLeod
- Relatives: Alexander Macdonald, 2nd Baron Macdonald (grandson); Godfrey Macdonald, 3rd Baron Macdonald (grandson); Sir James Macdonald, 2nd Baronet (grandson)

Sir Alexander Macdonald, 7th Baronet, 14th Chief of Sleat (1711 – 23 November 1746) was a Scottish Chief of Clan Macdonald of Sleat.

== Early life ==
Macdonald was born in 1711. He was the son of Sir James Macdonald, 6th Baronet and the former Janet Macleod. From his mother's first marriage to John Macleod, 2nd of Talisker (a grandson of Sir Roderick MacLeod, 15th Chief of Clan MacLeod), he had an elder half-brother, Donald MacLeod, 3rd of Talisker. From his parents' marriage, his siblings included Margaret Macdonald (wife of Sir Robert Douglas, 6th Baronet) and Janet Macdonald (wife of Sir Alexander Mackenzie, 5th Baronet).

His paternal grandparents were Sir Donald Macdonald, 3rd Baronet and Lady Mary Douglas (a daughter of the 8th Earl of Morton and Anne Villiers). His maternal grandparents were Alasdair MacLeod, 2nd of Grishornish and Margaret MacQueen.

== Career ==
Upon the death of his father in 1723, he succeeded as the 7th Baronet Macdonald, of Sleat, in the Isle of Skye, Inverness-shire, created in the Baronetage of Nova Scotia in 1625. In 1745, despite being expected to support the Jacobite cause during the rising of that year, he backed the Government, almost the only person in the district to do so. The Jacobite historian Melville Henry Massue assessed that it was the defection of Macdonald and MacLeod of MacLeod that largely contributed the failure of the rebellion.

== Personal life ==
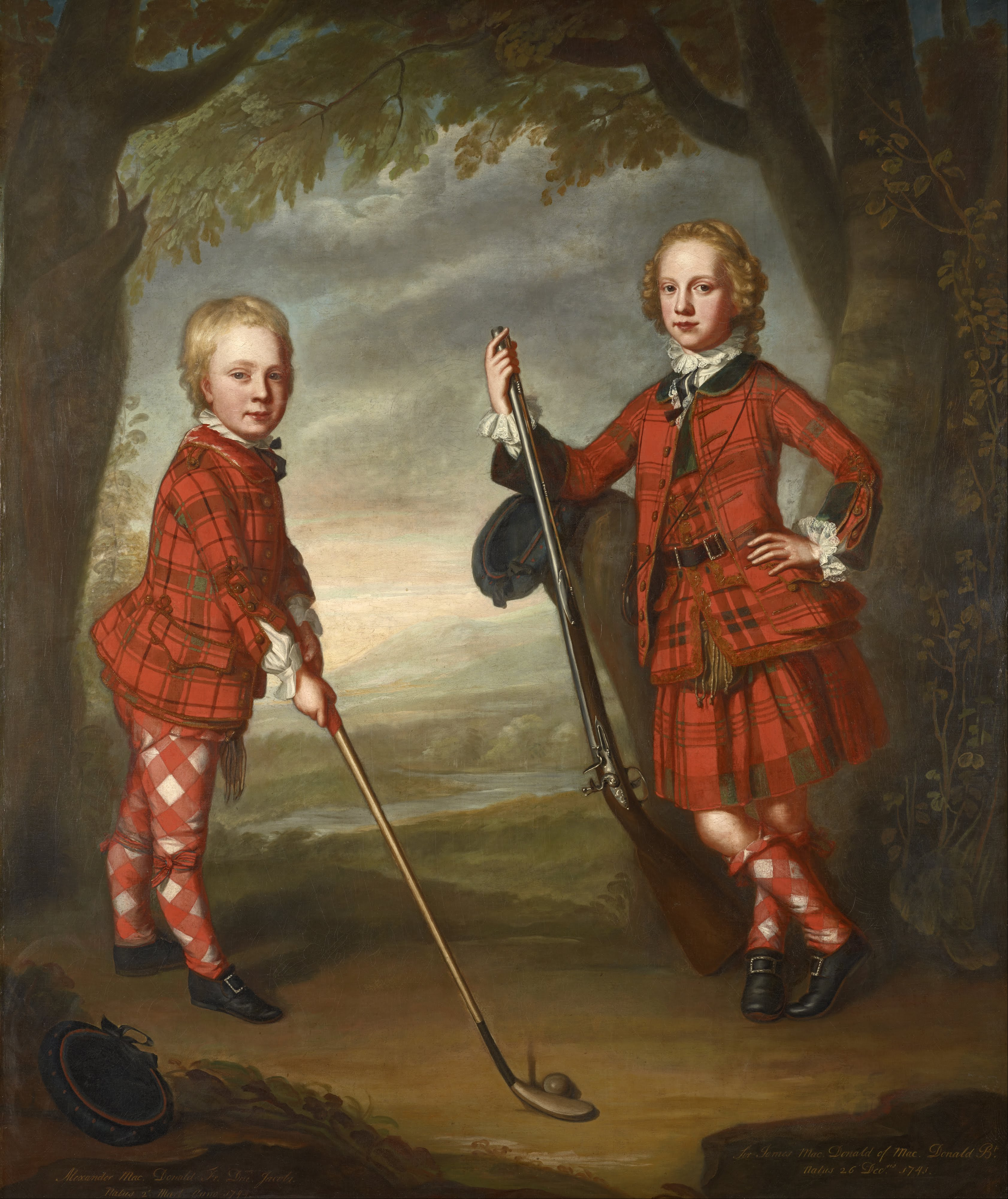
Portrait of his sons James and Alexander, attributed to William Mosman, 1740s, National Galleries of Scotland

On 3 April 1733, Macdonald married Anne, Lady Ogilvy, (née Erskine) (c. 1708–1735), a daughter of David Erskine, Lord Dun. Anne was the widow of James Ogilvy, Lord Ogilvy, the eldest son and heir apparent of David Ogilvy, 3rd Earl of Airlie and Lady Grizel Lyon (a daughter the 3rd Earl of Strathmore and Kinghorne) (Note: James Ogilvy, Lord Ogilvy took part in the Jacobite rising of 1715, for which he was attained by an Act of Parliament on 13 November 1715. Following his father's death in 1717, he became de jure 4th Earl of Airlie, however he could not claim the title because of the attainder. In 1725 he obtained a pardon from the Crown, and returned home but obtained a pardon from the Crown before his marriage to Anne Erskine in December 1830, shortly before his death in 1730.) Before her death on 27 November 1735, they were the parents of:

- Donald Macdonald (b. 1734), who died young.

After her death, he married Lady Margaret Montgomerie (d. 1799) on 24 April 1739 at St. Paul's Church, Edinburgh. Lady Margaret was a daughter of Alexander Montgomerie, 9th Earl of Eglinton, and Susanna Kennedy (a daughter of Sir Archibald Kennedy, 1st Baronet). Together, they were the parents of:

- Sir James Macdonald, 8th Baronet (c. 1742–1766), an accomplished scholar and mathematician who died unmarried in Rome, Italy. (Note: Although a Protestant, Sir James Macdonald, 8th Baronet, was given a public funeral by Pope Clement XII, and was "high eulogised by George, Lord Lyttelton.)
- Alexander Macdonald, 1st Baron Macdonald (c. 1745–1795), who married Elizabeth Diana Bosville, eldest daughter of Godfrey Bosville IV of Gunthwaite, and sister of Col. William Bosville, in 1768.
- Sir Archibald Macdonald, 1st Baronet (1747–1826), who served as MP for Hindon and Newcastle-under-Lyme; he married Lady Louisa Leveson-Gower, daughter of Granville Leveson-Gower, 1st Marquess of Stafford, in 1777.

Sir Alexander died unexpectedly on 23 November 1746 at Berneray. He was succeeded in the baronetcy by his eldest surviving son, the ten year-old James. His widow lived for more than fifty years until her death on 30 March 1799. After James' death without issue in 1766, the baronetcy passed to his next son, Alexander, who was created Baron Macdonald in the Peerage of Ireland in 1776. His youngest son, who was born after his death, was created a baronet in the Baronetage of the United Kingdom upon his retirement as Lord Chief Baron of the Exchequer in 1813.

=== Descendants ===
Through his son Alexander, he was posthumously a grandfather of Hon. Diana Macdonald (wife of Sir John Sinclair, 1st Baronet); Alexander Macdonald, 2nd Baron Macdonald (an MP for Saltash who died unmarried);. Godfrey Macdonald, 3rd Baron Macdonald (who married Louisa Maria La Coast, the illegitimate daughter of Prince William Henry, Duke of Gloucester and Edinburgh); and the Hon. Archibald Macdonald (who married Jane Campbell, daughter of Duncan Campbell of Arneave).

Through his youngest son Archibald, he was posthumously a grandfather of Louisa Macdonald; Sir James Macdonald, 2nd Baronet (who married Lady Sophia Keppel, a daughter of William Keppel, 4th Earl of Albemarle); and Caroline Diana Macdonald (who married Rev. Thomas Randolph, son of Rt. Rev. Dr. John Randolph).

Baronetage of Nova Scotia
Preceded by James Macdonald	Baronet (of Sleat); 1723–1746	Succeeded by James Macdonald
