= Sir Archibald Macdonald, 1st Baronet =

British lawyer, judge and politician

The Right Honourable Sir Alexander Macdonald Bt
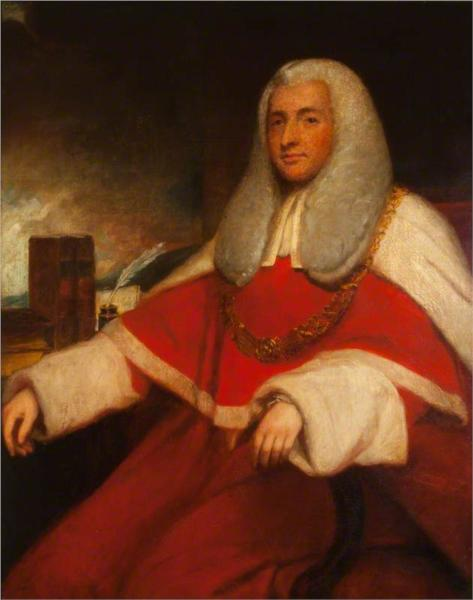
- Portrait of Macdonald, by George Romney, c. 1793-1795

Lord Chief Baron of the Exchequer
- In office 1793–1813
- Preceded by: Sir James Eyre
- Succeeded by: Sir Vicary Gibbs

Member of Parliament for Newcastle-under-Lyme
- In office 1780–1793 Serving with Viscount Trentham, Richard Vernon, John Leveson-Gower, William Egerton
- Preceded by: Viscount Chewton; Viscount Trentham
- Succeeded by: Sir Francis Ford; William Egerton

Member of Parliament for Hindon
- In office 1777–1780 Serving with Henry Dawkins
- Preceded by: Richard Smith; Henry Dawkins
- Succeeded by: Lloyd Kenyon; Nathaniel William Wraxall

Personal details
- Born: 13 July 1747; Armadale Castle, Skye
- Died: 18 May 1826 (aged 78)
- Spouse: Lady Louisa Leveson-Gower (m. 1777; died 1826)
- Relations: Alexander Macdonald, 1st Baron Macdonald (brother); Alexander Macdonald, 2nd Baron Macdonald (nephew); Godfrey Macdonald, 3rd Baron Macdonald (nephew); Sir James Macdonald, 6th Baronet (grandfather)
- Children: Sir James Macdonald, 2nd Baronet
- Education: Westminster School
- Alma mater: Christ Church, Oxford

Sir Archibald Macdonald, 1st Baronet (13 July 1747 – 18 May 1826) was a British lawyer, judge and politician.

== Early life ==
Macdonald was born at Armadale Castle on Skye on 13 July 1747, the posthumous son of Sir Alexander Macdonald, 7th Baronet, and his second wife, Lady Margaret Montgomerie. His elder brothers included Sir James Macdonald, 8th Baronet and Alexander Macdonald, 1st Baron Macdonald.

His paternal grandparents were Sir James Macdonald, 6th Baronet and the former Janet Macleod (a daughter of Alasdair MacLeod, 2nd of Grishornish). His maternal grandparents were Alexander Montgomerie, 9th Earl of Eglinton, and Susanna Kennedy (a daughter of Sir Archibald Kennedy, 1st Baronet).

He was brought to England, away from Jacobite influence and entered Westminster School in 1760. He went on to Christ Church, Oxford in 1764, graduating B.A. in 1768 and M.A. in 1772. He was called to the bar at Lincoln's Inn in 1770.

== Career ==
Macdonald was Member of Parliament for Hindon in Wiltshire, from 1777 until 1780, and then for Newcastle-under-Lyme, from 1780 to 1792, a seat where his father-in-law had a strong influence.

In politics, Macdonald followed the Whig lead of his father-in-law. He became solicitor-general in 1784 and attorney-general, and was knighted, in 1788. He served as the prosecutor in Thomas Paine's criminal libel trial over the publication of Rights of Man in 1792.

The 1792 Slave Trade Bill passed the House of Commons; mangled and mutilated by the modifications and amendments of Pitt, Earl of Mornington, Edward James Eliot and MacDonald, it lay for years, in the House of Lords.

=== Judicial career ===
Macdonald was appointed as second judge of the Carmarthen circuit in Wales in 1780. He was promoted as Lord Chief Baron of the Exchequer in 1793, and served in this post until he retired in 1813, with failing eyesight. On his retirement from the court, Macdonald was created 1st Baronet Macdonald, of East Sheen, in the Baronetage of the United Kingdom, on 27 November 1813.

== Personal life ==
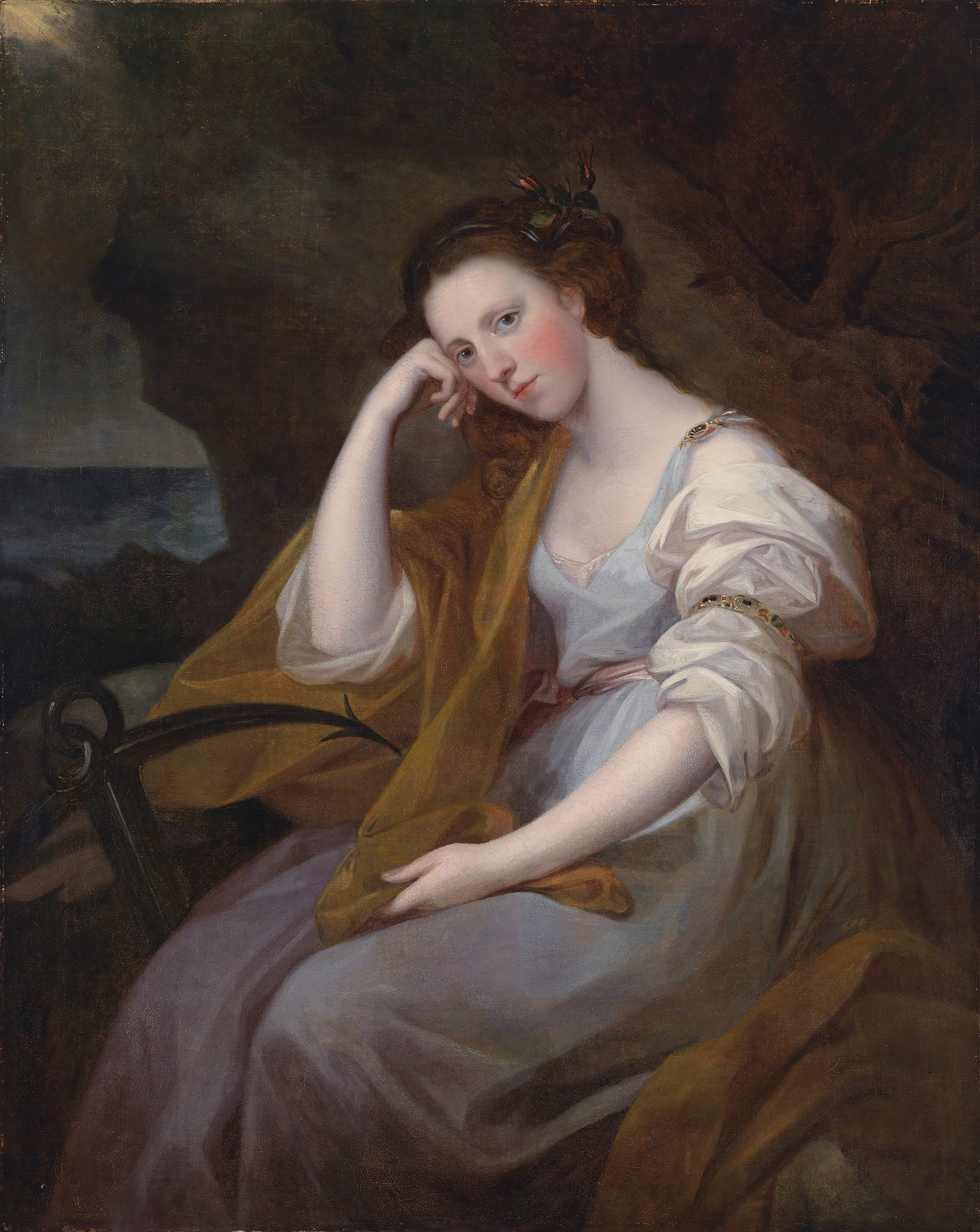
Macdonald's wife Louisa, Lady MacDonald, by Angelica Kauffman, 1767

On 26 November 1777, Macdonald married Lady Louisa Leveson-Gower (1757–1827), daughter of Granville Leveson-Gower, 1st Marquess of Stafford (at the time called by the courtesy title Earl Gower), then Lord President of the Council, and the former Lady Louisa Egerton (a daughter of the 1st Duke of Bridgwater). Together, they were the parents of two sons and five daughters, of which three survived:

- Susan Macdonald (1780–1803), who was the illustrator of "The Sports of the Genii" (1804) by Anne Hunter.
- Sir James Macdonald, 2nd Baronet (1784–1832), who married three times, including to Lady Sophia Keppel, a daughter of William Keppel, 4th Earl of Albemarle.
- Caroline Diana Macdonald (1790–1867), who married the cleric Thomas Randolph, son of The Rt. Rev. John Randolph.

Sir Archibald died on 18 May 1826. He was succeeded in the baronetcy by his only son, James.

=== Descendants ===
Through his youngest daughter Caroline, he was a grandfather of the naval officer George Granville Randolph.

Parliament of England
| Preceded by Richard Smith; Henry Dawkins | Member of Parliament for Hindon; 1777–1780; With: Henry Dawkins | Succeeded by Lloyd Kenyon; Nathaniel William Wraxall |
| Preceded by Viscount Chewton; Viscount Trentham | Member of Parliament for Newcastle-under-Lyme; 1780–1793; With: Viscount Trentham 1779–1784; Richard Vernon 1784–1790; John Leveson-Gower 1790–1792; William Egerton 1792–1793 | Succeeded by Sir Francis Ford; William Egerton |
Legal offices
| Preceded by Sir James Eyre | Lord Chief Baron of the Exchequer; 1793–1813 | Succeeded by Sir Vicary Gibbs |
Baronetage of the United Kingdom
| New creation | Baronet (of East Sheen); 1813–1826 | Succeeded by James Macdonald |
