= Sir Alexander Bosville Macdonald, 14th Baronet =

English landowner of Scottish descent

Sir Alexander Bosville Macdonald, Bt JP DL

High Sheriff of Yorkshire
- In office 1901–1902
- Preceded by: William Henry Battie-Wrightson
- Succeeded by: Sir Theophilus Peel, 1st Baronet

Personal details
- Born: Alexander Wentworth Macdonald Bosville; 26 September 1865
- Died: 26 March 1933 (aged 67) Thorpe Hall, East Riding, Yorkshire
- Spouse: Alice Edith Middleton (m. 1886; died 1933)
- Relations: Henry Willoughby, 8th Baron Middleton (uncle)
- Children: 2
- Parent(s): Godfrey Wentworth Bayard Bosville; Hon. Harriet Cassandra Willoughby
- Education: Eton College
- Alma mater: Magdalen College, Oxford

Sir Alexander Wentworth Macdonald Bosville Macdonald, 14th Baronet JP DL (né Alexander Wentworth Macdonald Bosville; 26 September 1865 – 26 March 1933) was an English landowner of Scottish descent.

== Early life ==
Born as Alexander Wentworth Macdonald Bosville (1826–1865) on 26 September 1865, he was the only son of Godfrey Wentworth Bayard Bosville, de jure 13th Baronet, and Hon. Harriet Cassandra Willoughby, who was granted the rank of a baron's daughter in c. 1856. His father died less than a month after his birth. His paternal aunt, Julia Louisa Bosville, married his maternal uncle, Henry Willoughby, 8th Baron Middleton.

His paternal grandparents were Alexander William Robert Bosville (eldest son of Lt.-Gen. Godfrey Macdonald, 3rd Baron Macdonald) and Matilda Eliza Moffat Bayard (a daughter of Col. John Bayard). His maternal grandparents were Henry Willoughby (son of the Rev. Hon. James Willoughby, a grandson of the 1st Baron Middleton) and Charlotte Eyre (a daughter of Venerable John Eyre Archdeacon of Nottingham).

He was educated at Aldin House, Slough, then Eton College before attending Magdalen College, Oxford.

== Career ==
Less than a month after his birth, he became de jure 14th Baronet Macdonald, of Sleat, in the Isle of Skye, County Inverness, in the Baronetage of Nova Scotia. Upon the death of his great-grandfather, Godfrey Macdonald, 3rd Baron Macdonald, 11th Baronet, in 1832 the baronetcy reverted as his three eldest children were born before his marriage to Louisa Maria La Coast (said to have been the illegitimate daughter of Prince William Henry, Duke of Gloucester and Edinburgh, himself a son of Frederick, Prince of Wales and a younger brother of King George III), so they were considered illegitimate, while the ten children born after their marriage were considered legitimate. The eldest three were eventually legitimized by Scottish law, but not by Irish law, therefore, the baronetcy passed, de jure, to his eldest son, Alexander (the grandfather of the 14th Baronet), while the Irish barony passed to his third son, Godfrey. Alexander's claim, however, was not formally recognised until a Court of Sessions decree on 4 June 1910. With this revival of the 1625 title, granted precedence as second of the Nova Scotia baronets at the time, the holder became the premier baronet. To 1908, the Gordon baronets of Letterfourie, created 28 May 1625, had been premier. On 30 June 1910 his name was legally changed to Alexander Wentworth Macdonald Bosville Macdonald confirmed by Lord Lyon King of Arms.

He inherited the family estates at Thorpe and Gunthwaite, both in Yorkshire, which came into the family through Elizabeth Diana Bosville (wife of Alexander Macdonald, 1st Baron Macdonald and heiress of her uncle, William Bosville). He was a Justice of the Peace and Deputy Lieutenant of East Riding, Yorkshire. He also served as High Sheriff of Yorkshire in 1901.

== Personal life ==
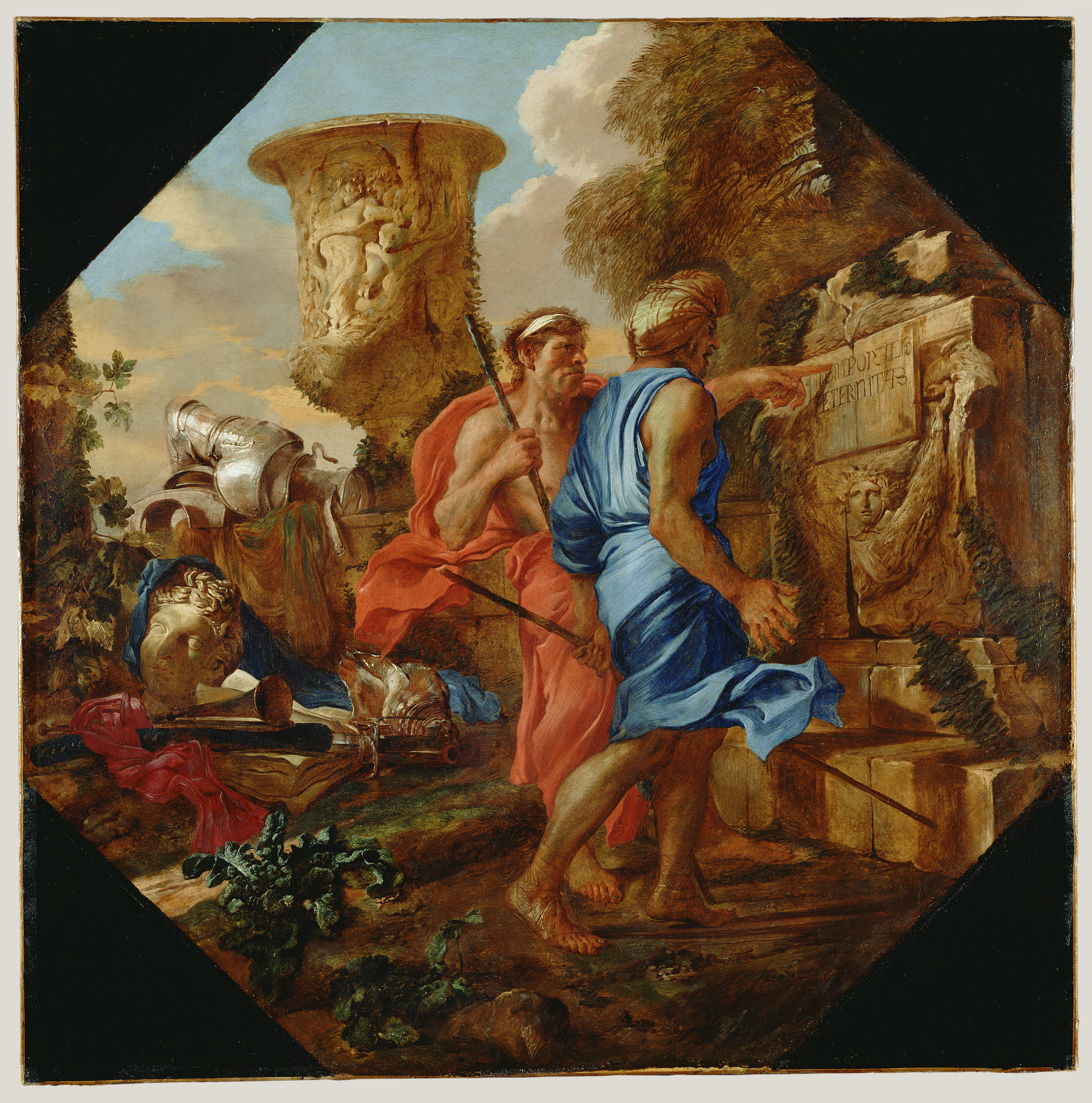
Arcadian Shepherds by Giovanni Benedetto Castiglione

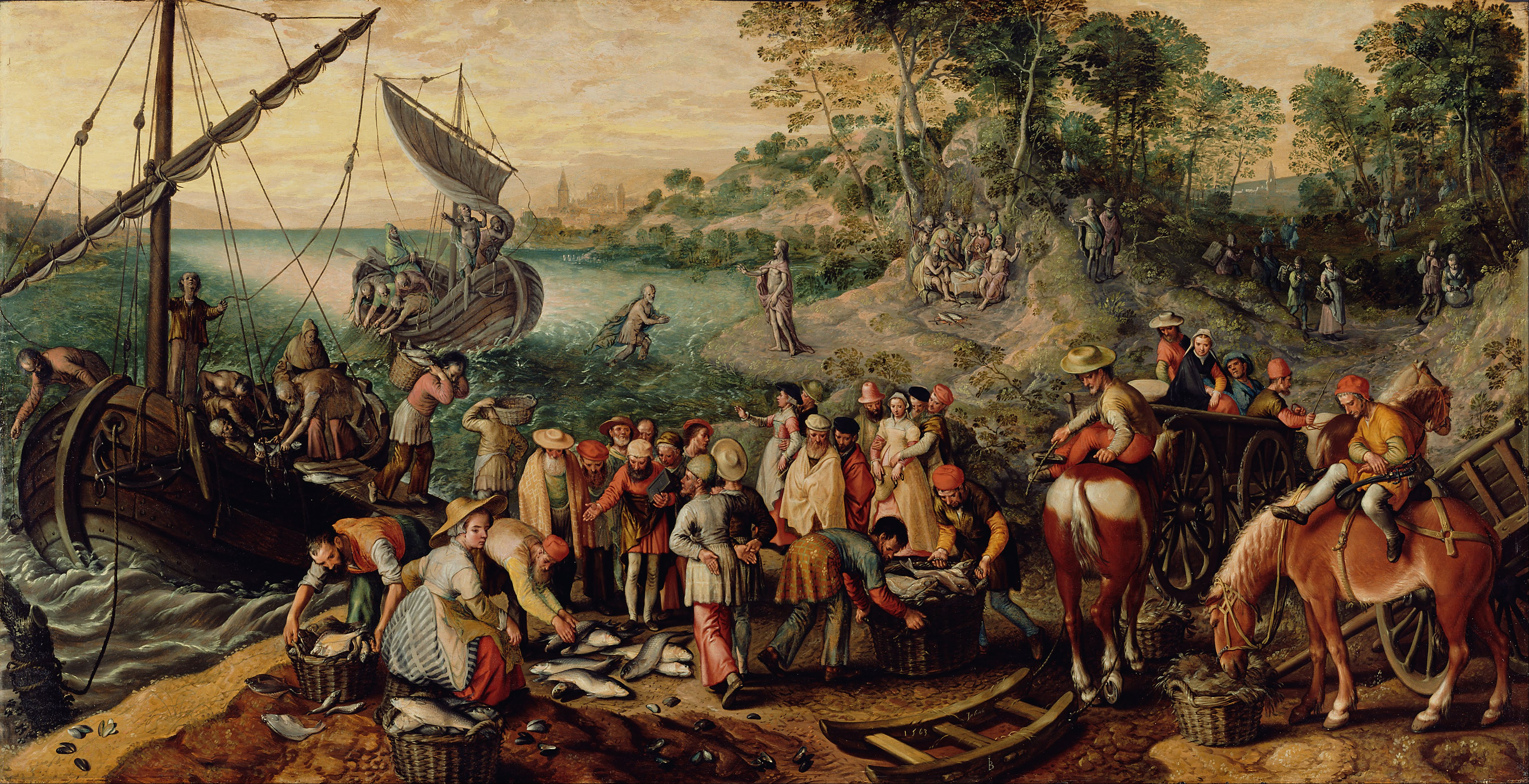
The Miraculous Draught of Fishes by Joachim Beuckelaer

On 20 October 1886, Alexander married Alice Edith Middleton (1861–1935), a writer who was a daughter of John Middleton of Kinfauns Castle, Perth, a descendant of the "old Scottish Earls of Middleton." Together, they lived at Thorpe Hall, Bridlington, and were the parents of:

- Sir Godfrey Middleton Bosville Macdonald, 15th Baronet (1887–1951), who married Hon. Rachel Audrey Campbell, daughter of Scottish banker Colin Campbell, 1st Baron Colgrain and Lady Angela Ryder (a daughter of the 4th Earl of Harrowby), in 1917.
- Celia Violet Bosville (b. 1889), who graduated from Oxford University in 1960; she was appointed an Officer of the Order of the British Empire in 1919, and a Commander of the Order of the British Empire, in 1937.

Sir Alexander died at Thorpe Hall on 26 March 1933, and was succeeded in the baronetcy by his only son, Godfrey. His widow died on 15 July 1935.

=== Art collection ===
From his father, Sir Alexander inherited the c. 1655 Arcadian Shepherds by Giovanni Benedetto Castiglione, and the c. 1563 The Miraculous Draught of Fishes by Joachim Beuckelaer. The Miraculous Draught of Fishes had been acquired by his great-grandfather, the 3rd Baron Macdonald, by 1821, and Arcadian Shepherds by the 3rd Baron Macdonald from Christie's in 1822 (from the 2nd Marquess of Bute). Both stayed in the family until the early 1907s when they were sold by his great-grandson, Sir Ian Bosville Macdonald, 17th Baronet. Arcadian Shepherds was sold at Christie's in 1970 to David Carritt, Ltd. (who sold it to the J. Paul Getty Museum in 1972) and The Miraculous Draught of Fishes was consigned in 1971 to Herner-Wengraf Ltd in London who sold it to the J. Paul Getty Museum.

Baronetage of Nova Scotia
Preceded by Godfrey Wentworth Bayard Bosville (de jure)	Baronet (of Sleat); 1865–1933	Succeeded by Godfrey Middleton Bosville Macdonald
