= Macdonald =

Macdonald, MacDonald or McDonald may refer to:

== Businesses and organisations ==
- McDonald's, an American multinational fast food restaurant chain
- McDonald & Co., a former investment firm
- MacDonald Motorsports, a NASCAR team
- Macdonald Realty, a Canadian real estate brokerage firm
- McDonald Centre, a research institute in the University of Oxford
- McDonald Observatory, an astronomical observatory in Texas (United States)

== People ==
=== People with the surname ===
- MacDonald (surname), a list of people with surname MacDonald and its variants
- Clan Donald, also known as Clan MacDonald, a Highland Scottish clan
- Baron Macdonald, a title in the Peerage of Ireland
- Macdonald baronets of Sleat (1625), a title in the Baronetage of Nova Scotia
- Macdonald baronets of East Sheen (1813), a title in the Baronetage of the United Kingdom
- Justice McDonald (disambiguation)

=== People with the given name ===
- Macdonald Carey (1913–1994), American actor
- Macdonald Niba (born 1994), Cameroonian footballer

== Places ==
=== Canada ===
- Macdonald, Manitoba
- Rural Municipality of Macdonald, Manitoba
- Macdonald (electoral district), Manitoba

=== United States ===
- McDonald, Kansas
- McDonald, Missouri
- McDonald County, Missouri
- McDonald, New Mexico
- McDonald, North Carolina
- McDonald, Ohio
- McDonald, Pennsylvania
- MacDonald, West Virginia
- McDonald Branch (Crooked River tributary), a stream in Missouri

=== Other places ===
- Heard Island and McDonald Islands, an Australian external territory
- McDonald (crater), on the Moon
- Macdonald River (disambiguation)

== See also ==
- Donald (disambiguation)
- MCD (disambiguation)
- Angus L. Macdonald Bridge, in Canada
- McDonald Beach, Antarctica
- McDonald Observatory, an astronomical observatory in Texas, United States
- Macdonald polynomials, in mathematics
- Macdonald triad, a set of factors associated with sociopathic behavior
- McDonald v. City of Chicago, a U.S. Supreme Court case
- "Old MacDonald Had a Farm", a nursery rhyme
- 991 McDonalda, an asteroid
- Ronald McDonald (disambiguation)
