= George Macpherson-Grant =

George Macpherson-Grant may refer to:

- Sir George Macpherson-Grant, 1st Baronet (1781–1846), MP for Sutherland
- Sir George Macpherson-Grant, 3rd Baronet (1839–1907)
- Sir George Macpherson-Grant, 5th Baronet (1890-1951), of the Macpherson-Grant Baronets

== See also ==
- George MacPherson
- George Grant (disambiguation)
