= Paul Jennings (British author) =

English humourist & author (1918–1989)

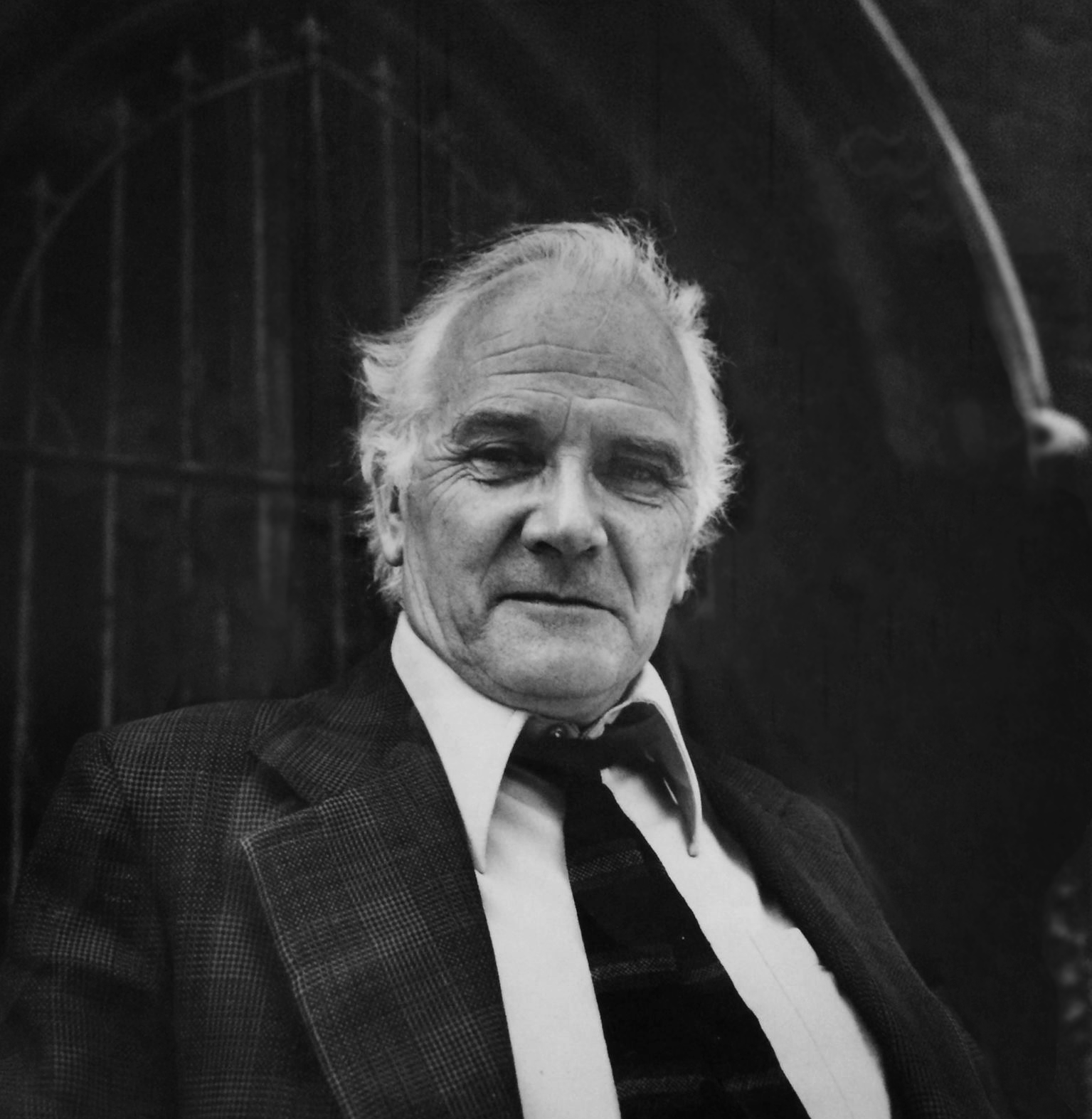
- Born: 20 June 1918; Leamington Spa, England
- Died: 26 December 1989 (aged 71)
- Occupation: Humourist
- Spouse: Celia Jennings

Paul Francis Jennings (20 June 1918 – 26 December 1989) was an English humourist and author.

Jennings served in the Royal Signal Corps during the Second World War. After leaving the army he worked as a scriptwriter for the Central Office of Information, as an advertising copywriter, and also as a freelance writer for Punch and The Spectator. For many years he wrote a column, Oddly Enough, in the British newspaper The Observer. Many collections of his work were published, including The Jenguin Pennings in 1963. He also wrote popular children's books including The Great Jelly of London, The Hopping Basket, and The Train to Yesterday. Jennings was a Fellow of the Royal Society of Literature.

== Early life and education ==
Paul Francis Jennings was born on 20 June 1918 in Leamington Spa. His parents were William Benedict and Gertrude Mary Jennings. He was educated at King Henry VIII School, Coventry, and at Douai School.

== Career ==
Jennings served in the Royal Signals during the Second World War from 1939-1945. In 1943, his piece "Moses was a Sanitary Officer" was published in Lilliput magazine. (Note: The Paul Jennings Reader, Bloomsbury, 1990) Freelance work for Punch and The Spectator soon followed. Leaving the army with the rank of Lieutenant, he worked for a year as a scriptwriter for the Central Office of Information and then spent two years as an advertising copywriter; throughout this period his freelance work continued to be published.

In 1949 he joined The Observer, contributing a fortnightly column entitled "Oddly Enough" until 1966, when he was succeeded by Michael Frayn, who was an admirer of his work. Many collections of his work were published, including The Jenguin Pennings (whose title is a spoonerism) by Penguin Books in 1963. He also wrote popular children's books including The Great Jelly of London, The Hopping Basket, and The Train to Yesterday.

After leaving The Observer, Jennings continued to write until his death, mainly seeing print in Punch, The Times and the Telegraph magazine. Jennings was a Fellow of the Royal Society of Literature.

Jennings was an admirer of James Thurber, (Note: Paul Jennings, "Thurber", Punch, March 1965. In: The Paul Jennings Reader, Bloomsbury, 1990) who attended a dinner party at Jennings' house and subsequently wrote of the conversation in a 1955 New Yorker piece. (Note: Jennings states that Thurber subsequently put incidents from the dinner into a New Yorker piece, including a discussion about writers' ages and a remark about people who might find it relaxing "to wash a Venetian blind". These can be found in: James Thurber, "The moribundant life, or, grow old along with whom?", The New Yorker, 23 September 1955. Collected in: Alarms and Diversions, Penguin, 1957. Thurber mentions London but no names. The 1957 collection adds "two years ago" to the mention of the party.)

== Writing style ==
Jennings wrote several hundred 700-word essays – usually involving whimsical ponderings – some of them based on real-life incidents. He also wrote poems, sometimes in invented languages. (Note: Paul Jennings, "Invenkion; buk Necessiki?", Times Literary Supplement, August 1982, reprinted in The Paul Jennings Reader, Bloomsbury, 1990) Other articles included extended flights of fancy, such as "The Unthinkable Carrier" (Note: Paul Jennings, "The Unthinkable Carrier", The Observer, November 1960.) in which Britain floats free from the Earth's crust with the Isle of Wight kept in place by a tow chain; or "Sleep for Sale", in which he imagines what might now be described as a capsule hotel. (Note: Paul Jennings, "Sleep for Sale", in Idly Oddly, Reinhardt, 1959.) Several of his pieces touched on the invented philosophical movement of Resistentialism. (Note: Paul Jennings, "Report on Resistentialism", The Spectator, 23 April 1948, reprinted as Thingness of Things, The New York Times, 13 June 1948)

== Personal life ==
Jennings married Celia Blom, daughter of music critic and lexicographer Eric Blom, in 1952. She provided illustrations for some of his books. The couple lived in East Bergholt, Suffolk, England, and had six children.

A keen chorister, Jennings sang with the Oriana Madrigal Society and the London Philharmonia Chorus. In later, years he was an active member of the church choir at St Thomas of Canterbury Church in Woodbridge.

Jennings died at Orford on 26 December 1989. He was 71.

== Bibliography ==
=== Oddly Enough collections ===
- Oddly Enough (Reinhardt and Evans, 1950)
- Even Oddlier (Reinhardt, 1952)
- Oddly Bodlikins (Reinhardt, 1953)
- Next to Oddliness (Reinhardt, 1955)
- Model Oddlies (Reinhardt, 1956)
- Gladly Oddly (Reinhardt, 1958)
- Idly Oddly (Reinhardt, 1959)
- I said Oddly, Diddle I? (Reinhardt, 1961)
- Oodles of Oddlies (Reinhardt, 1963)
- Oddly Ad Lib (Reinhardt, 1965)
- I Was Joking, Of Course (Reinhardt, 1968)
- It's an Odd Thing, But... (Reinhardt, 1971)

=== General collections ===
- The Jenguin Pennings (Penguin, 1963)
- A Precsription for Foreing Travel (sic) (Guinness, 1966) (Note: The 12-page booklet is a verse parody of European brochure-speak, produced as an advertisement for Guinness. On the back is printed 'Designed for Guinness by S. H. Benson, Ltd. Written by Paul Jennings. Illustrated by John Astrop. Printed in Great Britain by W. S. Cowell, Ltd. 587/66' It was the last of a series of advertising booklets, with different authors and illustrators each year, sent by Guinness to doctors each Christmas from 1933 to 1939 and 1950 to 1966.)
- I Must Have Imagined It (M. Joseph, 1977)
- Pun Fun (Hamlyn, 1980)
- Golden Oddlies (Methuen, 1983)
- The Paul Jennings Reader (Bloomsbury, 1990) (posthumous)

=== Books on British life ===
- The Living Village (Hodder and Stoughton, 1968)
- Just a Few Lines: Guinness Trains of Thought (London: Guinness Superlatives, 1969; ISBN 0900424508). About the Colne Valley, Scarborough–Whitby, Oxford–Fairford, and Neath–Brecon rail lines. With photographs by Graham Finlayson.
- Britain as She is Visit (M. Joseph, 1976)
- Companion to Britain (Cassell, 1981)
- East Anglia (Gordon Fraser, 1986)

=== Children's books ===
- The Hopping Basket (MacDonald & Co., 1965)
- The Great Jelly of London (Faber and Faber, 1967)
- The Train to Yesterday (Chambers, 1974)

=== Other ===
- Dunlopera: The Works and Workings of the Dunlop Rubber Company. Dunlop Rubber Co., 1961. About Dunlop; illustrated by Edward Bawden; not commercially issued. OCLC 59014464.
- And Now for Something Exactly the Same (Gollancz, 1977). A novel.

=== As editor ===
- The English Difference (Aurelia Enterprises, 1974) (co-edited with John Gorham)
- The Book of Nonsense (Macdonald, 1977) (illustrated by Wayne Anderson in 1978)
- A Feast of Days (Macdonald, 1982)
- My Favourite Railway Stories (Lutterworth Press, 1982)
