= William Bonville (disambiguation) =

William Bonville, 1st Baron Bonville (1392–1461) was an English nobleman.

William Bonville may also refer to:

- Sir William Bonville (died 1408), grandfather of William Bonville, 1st Baron Bonville; Member of Parliament for Somerset and Devon
- William Bonville Esq (died 1460), son of William Bonville, 1st Baron Bonville; died at the Battle of Wakefield
  - William Bonville, 6th Baron Harington (1442–1460), his son, who also died at the Battle of Wakefield

== See also ==
- William Bosville (1745–1814), British landlord
