= Sir Donald Gorme Og Macdonald, 1st Baronet =

Scottish laird

Sir Donald Gorme Macdonald, 8th Laird of Sleat, and 1st Baronet (died 1643) was a Scottish laird.

He had succeeded his uncle, Donald Gorme Mor Macdonald, 7th Laird of Sleat, who died, in 1616, without heirs. He was created a Baronet of Nova Scotia, by King Charles I, with a special clause of precedency placing him second of that order in Scotland. He adhered to the cause of Charles I, and died in 1643.

== Marriage and children ==
He married Janet, the second daughter of Kenneth Mackenzie, 1st Lord Mackenzie of Kintail and they had several children:

- Sir James Mor Macdonald, 9th Laird of Sleat
- Mary Macdonald, who married Ewen Cameron of Lochiel
- Alexander MacDonald of Sleat whose daughter married Lachlan Maclean, 3rd Laird of Torloisk
- Colonel Donald of Castleton, soldier

Baronetage of Nova Scotia
New creation	Baronet (of Sleat); 1625–1643	Succeeded by James Macdonald
