= Macdonald baronets of East Sheen (1813) =

Escutcheon of the Macdonald baronets of North Sheen

The Macdonald baronetcy, of East Sheen in the County of Surrey, was created in the Baronetage of the United Kingdom on 27 November 1813 for the judge and politician Archibald Macdonald. He was the posthumous son of the 7th baronet of the 1625 creation. This title became extinct on the death of the 4th baronet in 1919, who left no heir.

== Macdonald baronets, of East Sheen (1813) ==
- Sir Archibald Macdonald, 1st Baronet (1747–1826)
- Sir James Macdonald, 2nd Baronet (1784–1832)
- Sir Archibald Keppel Macdonald, 3rd Baronet (1820–1901)
- Sir Archibald John Macdonald, 4th Baronet (1871–1919)

== Notes ==
Baronetage of the United Kingdom
Preceded by Young baronets	Macdonald baronets of East Sheen; 27 November 1813	Succeeded by Wraxall baronets
