= Sir James Macdonald, 2nd Baronet =

British politician

The Right Honourable Sir James Macdonald, Bt GCMG
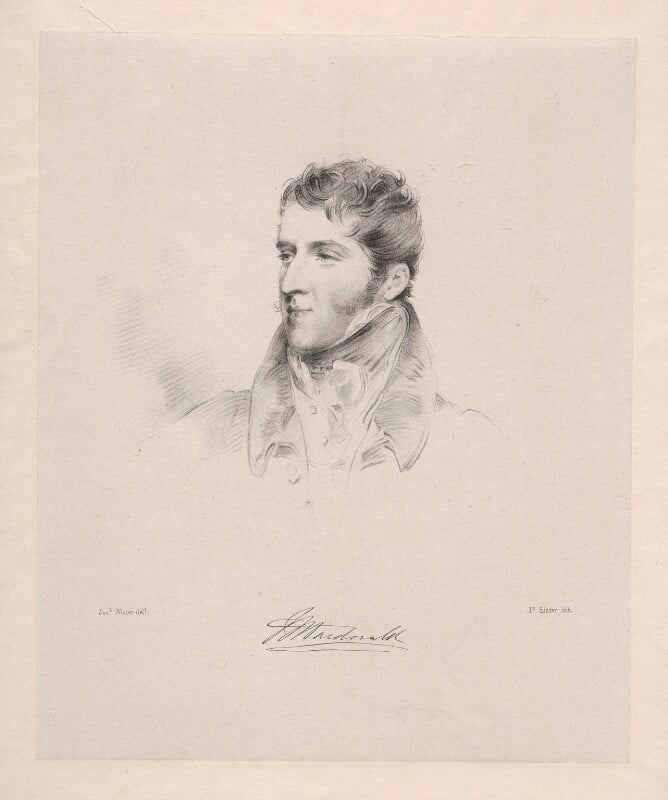

Lord High Commissioner of the Ionian Islands
- In office 1832–1832
- Preceded by: Sir Frederick Adam
- Succeeded by: Sir Alexander Woodford

Member of Parliament for Hampshire
- In office 1831–1832 Serving with Charles Shaw-Lefevre
- Preceded by: John Willis Fleming; Sir William Heathcote, Bt
- Succeeded by: Sir Thomas Baring, Bt; Charles Shaw-Lefevre

Member of Parliament for Calne
- In office 1816–1831 Serving with Hon. James Abercromby, Thomas Babington Macaulay
- Preceded by: Joseph Jekyll; Hon. James Abercromby
- Succeeded by: Charles Richard Fox; Thomas Babington Macaulay

Member of Parliament for Sutherland
- In office 1812–1816
- Preceded by: George Macpherson-Grant
- Succeeded by: George Macpherson-Grant

Member of Parliament for Newcastle-under-Lyme
- In office 1806–1812 Serving with Edward Wilbraham Bootle
- Preceded by: Sir Robert Lawley; Edward Wilbraham Bootle
- Succeeded by: Earl Gower; Sir John Boughey, Bt

Member of Parliament for Tain Burghs
- In office 1805–1806
- Preceded by: Hon. John Villiers 1805–1806
- Succeeded by: John Randoll Mackenzie

Personal details
- Born: 14 February 1784
- Died: 29 June 1832 (aged 48)
- Spouse(s): Elizabeth Sparrow (m. 1805; died 1818) Lady Sophia Keppel (m. 1819; died 1824) Anne Charlotte Ogle (m. 1826; died 1832)
- Parent(s): Sir Archibald Macdonald, 1st Baronet; Lady Louisa Leveson-Gower
- Education: Westminster School
- Alma mater: Christ Church, Oxford

Sir James Macdonald, 2nd Baronet, GCMG (14 February 1784 – 29 June 1832) was a British politician. He sat in the House of Commons between 1805 and 1832.

== Early life ==
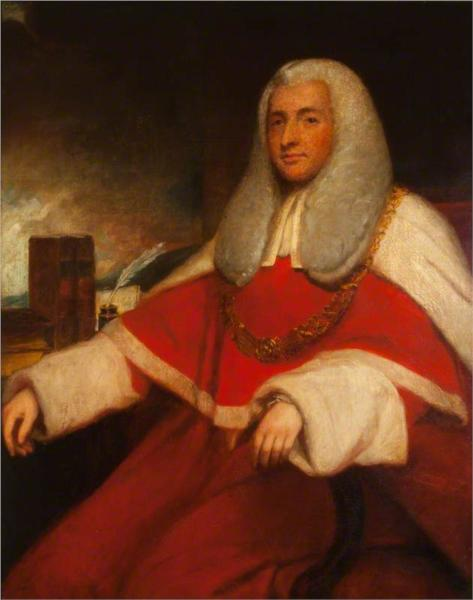
Portrait of his father, Sir Archibald Macdonald, 1st Baronet, by George Romney, c. 1793

Macdonald was born 14 February 1784, the eldest and only surviving son of Sir Archibald Macdonald, a Baron of the Exchequer, by Lady Louisa Leveson-Gower. His two surviving siblings were Susan Macdonald, the illustrator of "The Sports of the Genii", and Caroline Diana Macdonald (wife of Rev. Thomas Randolph, son of The Rt. Rev. John Randolph).

His paternal grandparents were Sir Alexander Macdonald, 7th Baronet, and, his second wife, Lady Margaret Montgomerie (a daughter of the 9th Earl of Eglinton and Susanna Kennedy). Among his extended paternal family were uncles, Sir James Macdonald, 8th Baronet and Alexander Macdonald, 1st Baron Macdonald. His maternal grandparents were Granville Leveson-Gower, 1st Marquess of Stafford and Lady Louisa Egerton (a daughter of the 1st Duke of Bridgwater). Among his extended maternal family were aunts Lady Margaret Leveson-Gower (wife of the 5th Earl of Carlisle), Lady Anne Leveson-Gower (wife of the Rt. Rev. Hon. Edward Venables-Vernon-Harcourt, Archbishop of York), Lady Georgiana Augusta Leveson-Gower (wife of the 2nd Earl of St Germans), Lady Charlotte Leveson-Gower (wife of the 6th Duke of Beaufort), and Lady Susanna Leveson-Gower (wife of the 1st Earl of Harrowby); and uncles George Leveson-Gower, 1st Duke of Sutherland and Granville Leveson-Gower, 1st Earl Granville.

Like his father, he was educated at Westminster and Christ Church, Oxford. He was admitted to Lincoln's Inn in 1804.

== Career ==
With the support of his uncle, George Leveson-Gower, 2nd Marquess of Sutherland (later first duke), Macdonald was first elected to parliament at the by-election for the Tain Burghs in 1805. He then successfully contested the seats of Newcastle-under-Lyme at the general election of 1806, Sutherland at the general election of 1812, the Calne by-election of 1816 (and subsequent elections) and Hampshire at the general election of 1831.

Macdonald's father was created a baronet on his retirement in 1813 and on his death in 1826, James inherited the title. Sir James was persuaded to accept the office of Lord High Commissioner of the Ionian Islands, in the hope that the climate of the Mediterranean would improve his poor health. He was appointed to the office on 2 June 1832 and immediately gave up his Hampshire seat in the Commons. He was gazetted a Knight Grand Cross of the Order of St Michael and St George on 22 June, the same day of the subsequent Hampshire by-election. However, he died on 29 June 1832, without having set sail for Corfu or being invested as a knight.

== Personal life ==
Sir James was married three times. His first marriage was to Elizabeth Sparrow (1789–1818) on 5 September 1805. She was a daughter of John Sparrow, of Bishton Hall, Staffordshire. She died on 4 January 1818; they had no issue.

He married Lady Sophia Keppel (c. 1798–1824) on 10 August 1819. She was the eldest daughter of William Keppel, 4th Earl of Albemarle and Hon. Elizabeth Southwell (a daughter of the 20th Baron de Clifford). Before her death on 29 September 1824, they had two sons:

- Sir Archibald Keppel Macdonald, 3rd Baronet (1820–1901), an army officer who married Lady Margaret Sophia Coke, a daughter of Thomas Coke, 1st Earl of Leicester and Anne Amelia Keppel, daughter of William Keppel, 4th Earl of Albemarle in 1849, his cousin. After her death, he married Catherine Mary (née Coulthurst) Stonor, widow of Hon. Thomas Stonor (a son of 3rd Baron Camoys) who was a daughter of John Nicholas Coulthurst, in 1869.
- Granville Southwell Macdonald (1821–1831), who died young.

His third, and final, marriage was on 20 April 1826 to Anne Charlotte Ogle (c. 1803–1886), a daughter of the Rev. John Saville Ogle, of Kirkley Hall, Northumberland, who was prebendary of Durham, and Catherine Hannah Sneyd.

After dining at his father-in-law's home at Berkeley Square on 27 June 1832, he fell ill the next day and died of cholera on the 29th at Spring Gardens. He left the bulk of his estate including landed property, shares in the Birmingham and Liverpool Junction Co., to his only surviving son, Archibald, who succeeded him in the baronetcy.

=== Descendants ===
Through his son Arichbald, he was a grandfather of Mary Catherine Macdonald (wife of Leonard Labouchere Hillyer) and Sir Archibald Macdonald, 4th Baronet, upon whose death the baronetcy became extinct.

Parliament of the United Kingdom
Preceded by Hon. John Villiers	Member of Parliament for Tain Burghs; 1805–1806	Succeeded by John Randoll Mackenzie
Preceded by Sir Robert Lawley; Edward Wilbraham Bootle	Member of Parliament for Newcastle-under-Lyme; 1806–1812; With: Edward Wilbraham Bootle	Succeeded by Earl Gower; Sir John Boughey, Bt
Preceded by George Macpherson-Grant	Member of Parliament for Sutherland; 1812–1816	Succeeded by George Macpherson-Grant
Preceded by Joseph Jekyll; Hon. James Abercromby	Member of Parliament for Calne; 1816–1831; With: Hon. James Abercromby to 1830; Thomas Babington Macaulay from 1830	Succeeded by Charles Richard Fox; Thomas Babington Macaulay
Preceded by John Willis Fleming; Sir William Heathcote, Bt	Member of Parliament for Hampshire; 1831–1832; With: Charles Shaw-Lefevre	Succeeded by Sir Thomas Baring, Bt; Charles Shaw-Lefevre
Government offices
Preceded by Sir Frederick Adam	Lord High Commissioner of the Ionian Islands; 1832	Succeeded by Sir Alexander Woodford (acting)
Baronetage of the United Kingdom
Preceded by Archibald Macdonald	Baronet (of East Sheen); 1826–1832	Succeeded by Archibald Macdonald
