= Sir Donald Macdonald, 4th Baronet =

Scottish Jacobite and clan chief (1650–1718)

Sir Donald Macdonald, 4th Baronet 11th of Sleat
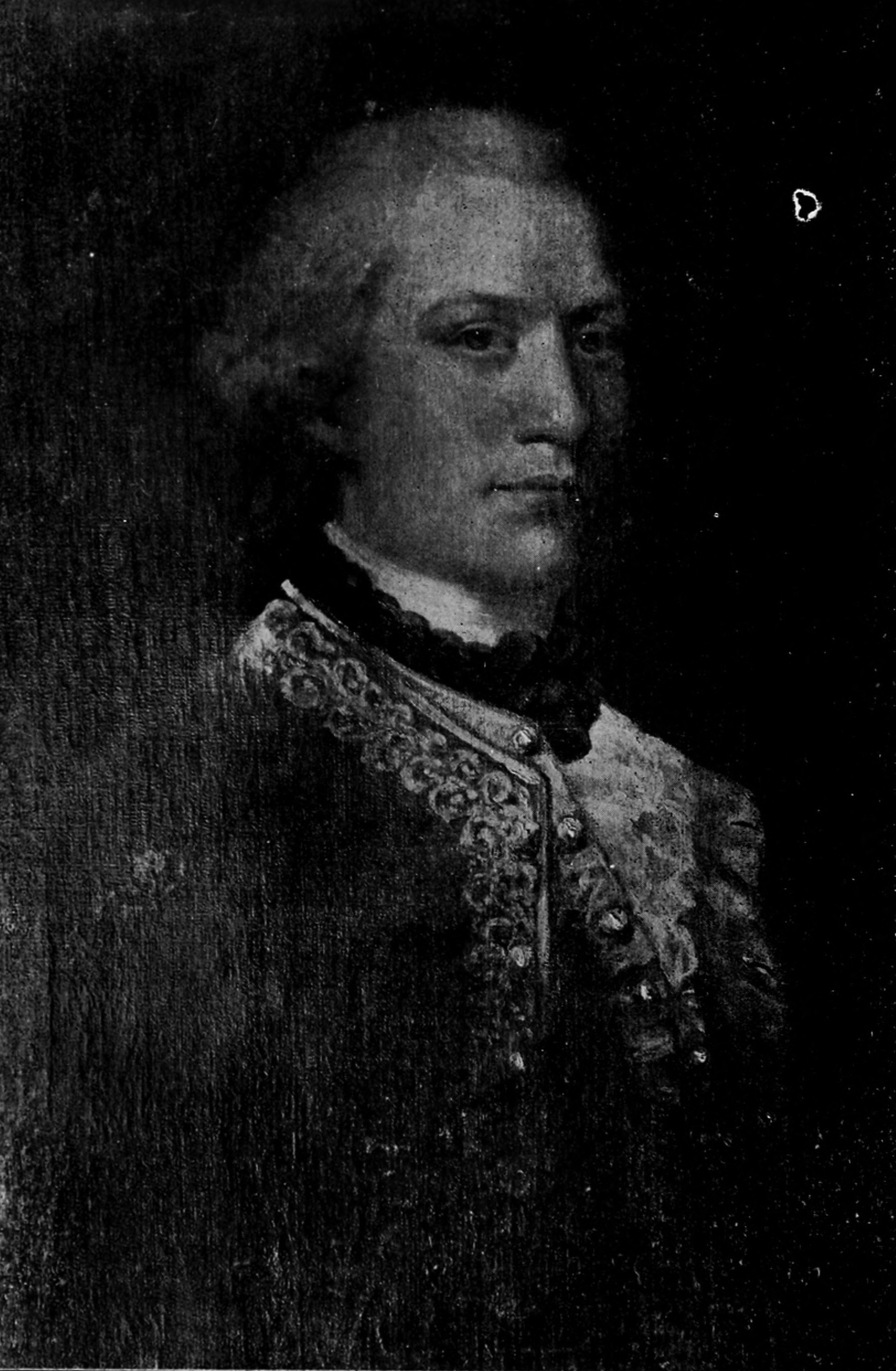
- Sir Donald Macdonald, Bt
- Born: 1650
- Died: March 1718 (aged 67–68)
- Spouse: Mary Macdonald
- Relatives: Sir James Mor Macdonald (grandfather)
- Military career
- Allegiance: Jacobites (from 1689)
- Nickname: Dòmhnall a' Chogaidh
- Commands: Clan Macdonald of Sleat
- Conflicts: Jacobite rising of 1689; Jacobite rising of 1715

Sir Donald Macdonald, 4th Baronet (1650 – March 1718) was a Scottish Jacobite soldier and Chief of Clan Macdonald of Sleat. He fought in two Jacobite uprisings and was known as Dòmhnall a' Chogaidh ("Donald of the War") and, after 1716, as Lord Sleat in Jacobite circles.

== Early life ==
Macdonald was the son of Sir Donald Macdonald, 3rd Baronet and Lady Mary Douglas, daughter of Robert Douglas, 8th Earl of Morton. His Royalist grandfather, Sir James Mor Macdonald, had supported Charles II in the Anglo-Scottish war. Owing to his father's ill health, Macdonald led the clan in support of James VII in the Jacobite rising of 1689, during which the clan suffered heavy casualties at the Battle of Killiecrankie on the Jacobite army's extreme left wing. His father's clan subsequently made peace with the Williamite government.

== Career ==
Macdonald inherited his father's titles and estates in 1695, but moved to Glasgow and had little interaction with his clan on the Isle of Skye until 1715. He did, however, remain in close contact with the Jacobite agents of the Old Pretender, James Francis Edward Stuart. In 1714, he was briefly arrested under suspicion of Jacobite sympathies, but he was released in the autumn of 1714 after the friendly intercession of the Duke of Montrose.

The following year, on the outbreak of the Jacobite rising of 1715, Macdonald was summoned by the Lord Advocate to appear at Edinburgh to swear allegiance to the government of George I of Great Britain, under pain of a year's imprisonment. Rather than attending, Macdonald joined the rising and travelled to Skye to raise his followers, which have been estimated to have numbered between 700 and 900 men. At the beginning of October 1715, the baronet at the head of his men joined the Earl of Seaforth at Brahan, and they together proceeded to Alness where there was a brief skirmish with government forces. Macdonald's men fought in the Battle of Sheriffmuir in November, but Macdonald himself fell ill and returned to Skye. He subsequently fled to North Uist when government soldiers were sent to Skye to apprehend him.

In April 1716, Macdonald offered to surrender himself under the terms of a recently passed Act of Parliament, but pleaded that he was not healthy enough to travel to Inverlochy to surrender in person as the act required. When he failed to appear in Inverlochy he was found guilty of high treason, and his estates (but not his title) were accordingly forfeited. He fled to France and joined the exiled Stuart court at Château de Saint-Germain-en-Laye where, on 23 December 1716, he was created Lord Sleat in the Jacobite peerage by the Old Pretender. He may have returned to Scotland prior to his death in 1718.

== Personal life ==
He married Mary Macdonald, daughter of John Macdonald, 2nd of Castleton and Anne MacLean. The couple had one son and four daughters, including:

- Sir Donald Macdonald, 5th Baronet (c. 1697–1720), who matriculated at Christ Church, Oxford in 1712; he died unmarried.

Sir Donald died in March 1718 and was succeeded in his titles by his only son, Donald. After his son died 1720 without issue, the baronetcy passed to the 4th Baronet's younger brother, James.

Peerage of Scotland
New creation	— TITULAR — Lord Sleat; Jacobite peerage 1716–1718	Succeeded by Donald Macdonald
Baronetage of Nova Scotia
Preceded by Donald Macdonald	Baronet (of Sleat); 1695–1718	Succeeded by Donald Macdonald
