= McDo =

McDo may refer to:

- A colloquial shortening of McDonald's, especially as applied to:
  - McDonald's France
  - McDonald's Philippines
  - McDonald's Canada

== See also ==
- Maxime, McDuff & McDo – 2002 documentary film directed by Magnus Isacsson
- MCD
