= Listed buildings in Gunthwaite and Ingbirchworth =

Gunthwaite and Ingbirchworth is a civil parish in the metropolitan borough of Barnsley, South Yorkshire, England. The parish contains 23 listed buildings that are recorded in the National Heritage List for England. Of these, one is listed at Grade I, the highest of the three grades, two are at Grade II*, the middle grade, and the others are at Grade II, the lowest grade. The parish contains the village of Ingbirchworth and the smaller settlement of Gunthwaite, and is otherwise rural. Most of the listed buildings are farmhouses and farm buildings, the farm buildings including Gunthwaite Hall Barn, which is described by Pevsner as "one of the finest in the country". The other listed buildings are houses and associated structures, and a water mill.

== Key ==
Grade	Criteria
I	Buildings of exceptional interest, sometimes considered to be internationally important
II*	Particularly important buildings of more than special interest
II	Buildings of national importance and special interest

== Buildings ==
Name and location	Photograph	Date	Notes	Grade
Gunthwaite Hall Barn; 53.55522°N 1.64234°W		Mid 16th century	The barn is in stone in its lower part, the upper parts are timber framed, and the roof is in stone slate. There are eleven internal bays, and aisles on both sides. The barn contains full-height cart entrances, doorways, and slit vents with chamfered surrounds.	I
Barn, Ingfield Farm; 53.54699°N 1.66444°W	—	16th century (probable)	A stone barn with quoins, and a stone slate roof. There are five internal bays, and a small rear outshut. The barn contains a square-headed cart entry, and a square pitching holed, and inside are four large cruck trusses.	II*
Grange Farmhouse; 53.54928°N 1.66350°W	—	1624	At one time an inn, and later a private house, the right wing was added in the 18th century. The house is in stone, rendered apart from the left wing, with quoins, and a stone slate roof with chamfered gable copings on moulded kneelers. There are two storeys and an attic, a central range with two bays, and gabled flanking wings, and a rear wing. The doorway has a moulded surround and an arched lintel. Above it is a plaque with an inscription and date, and over this is a sundial on a corbel. The windows are mullioned, some with hood moulds.	II
Annat Royd Farmhouse; 53.54088°N 1.67962°W	—	17th century	A farmhouse that has been much altered, it is in stone with quoins and a stone slate roof. There are two storeys, a symmetrical front of three bays, and a rear outshut. The central doorway has a Tudor arched lintel, and the windows are mullioned.	II
Cottage northeast of 24 Penistone Road; 53.54882°N 1.66173°W	—	17th century	The former cottage is in stone with a stone slate roof and two storeys. It has a gabled front of one bay, and contains mullioned windows with hood moulds.	II
Green Farmhouse; 53.54723°N 1.66358°W	—	17th century	The farmhouse, which has been altered, is in stone with quoins and a stone slate roof. There are two storeys and an L-shaped plan, with a front of three bays, the left bay projecting and gabled. The doorway on the front has a chamfered surround and a deep lintel. Most of the windows are mullioned, some with hood moulds, some with mullions removed, and some replaced by sash windows. On the gable apex is a trefoiled opening, and above the door is a 20th-century dormer. The right return contains a doorway with a moulded surround, an ornamental lintel, and a hood mould, above which is a small plaque.	II
Barn, Green Farm; 53.54709°N 1.66340°W	—	17th century	A stone barn with quoins and a stone slate roof. There are five internal bays, an outshut at the rear, and a smaller outshut at the front. In the centre is a square-headed cart entry, and to the right is a small doorway with a chamfered surround.	II
Gunthwaite Hall (west); 53.55444°N 1.64297°W	—	17th century	A farmhouse, most of which dates from the late 18th and early 19th century, it is in stone and has a hipped stone slate roof. There are two storeys and an L-shaped plan, with a symmetrical front range of three bays, and a rear wing on the left. The central doorway has a quoined surround and a fanlight, and the windows are sashes. The rear wing has a two-storey bow window, with a Venetian window in the ground floor, and a casement window above. To the right is an entrance with a moulded surround, and above it is a two-light mullioned window.	II
Ings Cottage; 53.54698°N 1.66423°W	—	17th century	The cottage has rendered walls, a stone slate roof, two storeys, and two bays. The left bay is gabled, and has chamfered copings on moulded kneelers. The windows are mullioned.	II
Water Mill; 53.55246°N 1.62523°W	—	17th century	The water mill, which dates mainly from the 18th century, is in stone with a Welsh slate roof. There are two storeys and an L-shaped plan, consisting of a range with three bays, and a main gabled wing. The entrance has a quoined surround and a wooden lintel, and the windows are mullioned. In the main part is a cast iron pitch-back water wheel.	II
Willow Farmhouse; 53.54642°N 1.66295°W	—	17th century	The farmhouse is in stone with quoins and a stone slate roof. There are two storeys, three bays, the right bay gabled, and a central gabled rear wing. On the front is as lean-to porch containing stone benches, with a moulded and quoined surround, and an ornamental lintel. Most of the windows are mullioned with hood moulds, and in the middle bay is a mullioned and transomed window.	II
Summer house, Gunthwaite Hall; 53.55409°N 1.64254°W	—	1688	The summer house in the garden to the south of the hall is in stone on a chamfered plinth, with quoins, a chamfered floor band, a moulded eaves cornice, and a pyramidal stone slate roof. There are two storeys and a basement, and one bay. The doorway is in the upper floor, and has a moulded quoined surround, moulded imposts, and an ornamental lintel, above which is a plaque with a coat of arms. Some windows are chamfered, some are sashes, and some have hood moulds.	II
Broadfield Farmhouse; 53.54610°N 1.66245°W	—	1691	A stone farmhouse with quoins, a continuous hood mould, and a stone slate roof with gable copings on moulded kneelers. There are two storeys, three bays, and a rear outshut. The doorway has a moulded surround and an arched lintel inscribed with initials and the date. Most of the windows are mullioned, some mullions have been removed, and some windows have been altered or replaced.	II
Stable range west of Gunthwaite Hall Barn; 53.55516°N 1.64314°W	—	1699	The stable range is in stone on a chamfered plinth, with quoins, a continuous hood mould, and an asbestos sheet roof with chamfered gable copings on cut kneelers with ball finials. There are two storeys and an L-shaped plan, with a main range of four bays, and a wing at right angles. The building contains an entrance with a quoined surround, and a chamfered initialled and dated lintel, chamfered windows, and a plaque with a coat of arms.	II*
Farm buildings south of Gunthwaite Hall Barn; 53.55508°N 1.64190°W		1701	The farm buildings are in stone, and have a stone slate roof with gable copings on moulded kneelers with finials. The building contains paired cart entries with shallow segmental heads and shared jambs. These are flanked by openings with Tudor arched heads, some blocked, and one dated. Elsewhere are mullioned windows, and in two gable ends are dovecotes.	II
Far Broad Oak Farmhouse; 53.55570°N 1.62810°W	—	Mid 18th century	The farmhouse is in stone on a chamfered plinth, with quoins, a floor band, and a Welsh slate roof with square-cut gable copings on moulded kneelers. There are two storeys and an L-shaped plan, with a symmetrical front of three bays, and a rear wing on the left. The doorway has a chamfered surround, and the windows are mullioned.	II
Gunthwaite Gate Farmhouse; 53.55921°N 1.65242°W		Late 18th century	The farmhouse is in stone with quoins, and a stone slate roof with chamfered gable copings on moulded kneelers. There are two storeys and three bays. The doorway has a quoined surround and a deep lintel, and the windows are mullioned.	II
Barn range, Gunthwaite Gate Farm; 53.55896°N 1.65250°W	—	Late 18th century	The range of farm buildings is in stone with a stone slate roof. The main barn has five internal bays, and contains a segmental cart entry with a quoined surround. The part to the left is slightly earlier, and contains an entrance in both floors, with external steps to the upper door. Attached at a right angle is a stable range containing three doorways.	II
Barn, Broadfield Farm; 53.54599°N 1.66222°W	—	Late 18th or early 19th century	A stone barn with a stone slate roof and five internal bays. It contains segmental-headed cart entries, and on the front, steps lead to an upper floor doorway.	II
Gunthwaite Hall (east); 53.55452°N 1.64260°W	—	Late 18th or early 19th century	A farmhouse divided into two, it is in stone with millstone grit quoins, and a stone slate roof with gable copings on cut kneelers. There are two storeys and four bays. On the front are two doorways with quoined surrounds. Some windows are mullioned, some are sashes, and at the rear are casement windows.	II
Barn, Willow Farm; 53.54627°N 1.66301°W	—	Late 18th or early 19th century (probable)	The barn is in stone, incorporating some 17th-century material, with quoins, and a stone slate roof with gable copings on moulded kneelers. It contains an elliptical-arched cart entry, two entrances with Tudor arched head sand quoined surrounds, and two pitching holes with quoined surrounds.	II
Barn, Annat Royd Farm; 53.540°N 1.67973°W	—	1805	The barn is in stone with a stone slate roof, and has an L-shaped plan. In the longer range are entrances, including a tall elliptical headed cart entry with an inserted lintel and an initialled and dated keystone. On the range attached to the farmhouse are external steps leading to an upper floor doorway, and it contains a two-light mullioned window.	II
Mill Farmhouse; 53.55235°N 1.62531°W	—	Early 19th century	A stone farmhouse, rendered on the left return, with a stone slate roof. There are two storeys, two bays, a rear outshut, and an extension on the right. The doorway is in the centre, and the windows are mullioned with three lights.	II
