= Justice McDonald =

Justice McDonald or MacDonald may refer to:

- Andrew J. McDonald (b. 1966), associate justice of the Connecticut Supreme Court
- Charles James McDonald (1793–1860), associate justice of the Supreme Court of Georgia
- Francis M. McDonald Jr. (born 1931), associate justice of the Connecticut Supreme Court
- Gordon J. MacDonald (born 1961), chief justice of the New Hampshire Supreme Court
- Herbert S. MacDonald (1907–1998), justice of the Connecticut Supreme Court
- J. Michael MacDonald (fl. 1970s–2020s), chief justice of Nova Scotia
- John S. McDonald (1864–1941), associate justice of the Michigan Supreme Court
- Malcolm Archibald Macdonald (1875–1941), chief justice of British Columbia
- Parker Lee McDonald (1924–2017), associate justice of the Florida Supreme Court
- Robert N. McDonald (b. 1952), judge of the Maryland Court of Appeals

== See also ==
- Judge McDonald (disambiguation)
- Macdonald (disambiguation)
