= Wraxall baronets =

Baronetcy in the Baronetage of the United Kingdom

- Escutcheon of the Wraxall baronets
- Creation date: 1813
- Created by: George III
- Peerage: Peerage of the United Kingdom
- Status: extant

The Wraxall Baronetcy, of Wraxall in the County of Somerset, is a title in the Baronetage of the United Kingdom. It was created on 21 December 1813 for Nathaniel Wraxall. He was in the East India Company Civil Service, an author and member of parliament for Hindon, Ludgershall and Wallingford. His grandson, the third Baronet, was an author.

== Wraxall baronets, of Wraxall (1813) ==
- Sir Nathaniel William Wraxall, 1st Baronet (died 1831)
- Sir William Wraxall, 2nd Baronet (1791–1863)
- Sir (Frederic Charles) Lascelles Wraxall, 3rd Baronet (1828–1865)
- Sir Horatio Henry Wraxall, 4th Baronet (1832–1882)
- Sir Morville William Nathaniel Wraxall, 5th Baronet (1834–1898)
- Sir Morville William Wraxall, 6th Baronet (1862–1902)
- Sir Charles Frederick Lascelles Wraxall, 7th Baronet (1896–1951)
- Sir Morville William Lascelles Wraxall, 8th Baronet (1922–1978)
- Sir Charles Frederick Lascelles Wraxall, 9th Baronet (born 1961)

The heir apparent to the baronetcy is William Nathaniel Lascelles Wraxall (born 1987), only son of the 9th Baronet.

== Notes ==
Baronetage of the United Kingdom
Preceded by Macdonald baronets	Wraxall baronets of Wraxall; 21 December 1813	Succeeded by Fowke baronets
