= Ingbirchworth =

Village in South Yorkshire, England

Coordinates: 53°33′N 1°40′W

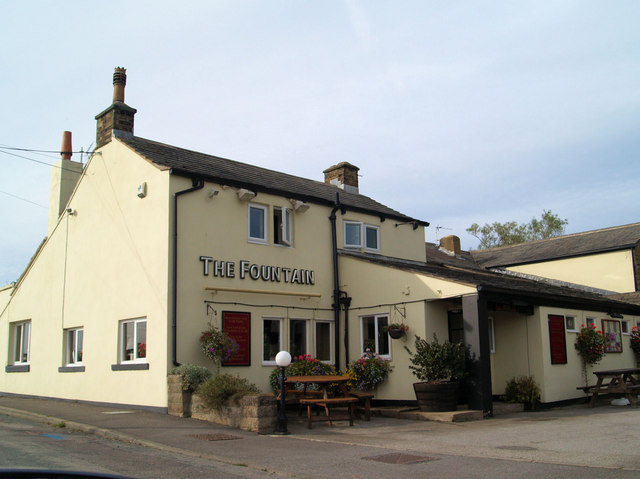
- The Fountain public house

- Location within South Yorkshire
- Civil parish: Gunthwaite and Ingbirchworth
- Metropolitan borough: Barnsley
- Metropolitan county: South Yorkshire
- Region: Yorkshire and the Humber
- Country: England
- Sovereign state: United Kingdom
- Post town: SHEFFIELD
- Postcode district: S36
- Dialling code: 01226

Ingbirchworth is a village in the civil parish of Gunthwaite and Ingbirchworth in the Barnsley district of South Yorkshire, England. It is close to the boundary with Kirklees in West Yorkshire. At the 2001 Census, the parish population was 400, and it increased to 460 at the 2011 Census, and is now estimated to be around 600.

The name Ingbirchworth derives from the Old English birceworð meaning 'birch enclosure', with the Old Norse eng meaning 'meadow' added later.

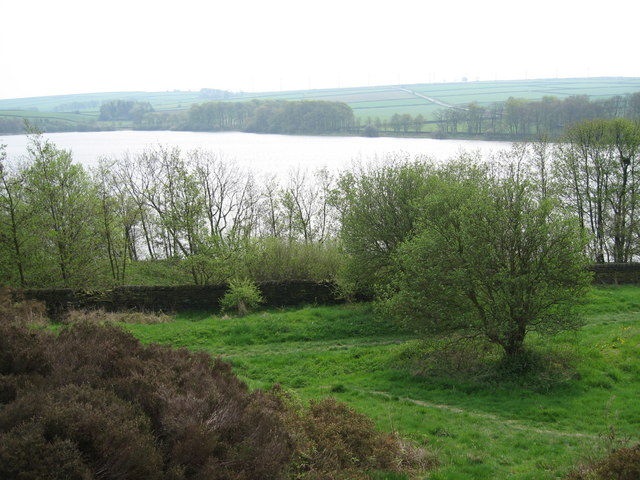
Ingbirchworth Reservoir

The village is notable for its reservoir, the oldest of the three situated in the area (the others being Royd Moor and Scout Dike). During extreme droughts in the summer the reservoir has dried up to the extent that the old bridge over the original stream, Summer Ford Bridge, can be seen. Development is mostly laid out along two roads: older houses and farms along the former turnpike, Huddersfield Road, the A629 and newer housing estates along Wellthorne Lane. It has one public house, the Fountain Inn, which reopened in 2021 having been saved from demolition. There is an agricultural suppliers and hardware shop on the edge of the village on Huddersfield Road.

The Grange is the oldest extant building in the village, dating to 1624. This and a number of other properties in the older part of the village are Grade II listed.

== Recent changes ==
The Rose And Crown public house was demolished in 2006 and its site was redeveloped for housing. The Methodist church was sold in 2014 and has been converted to dwellings. On 6 November 2015, a new war memorial was dedicated on a site on Wellthorne Avenue. This is the first permanent memorial of its type in the village. The village shop closed in 2016 but a handful of "honesty box" local producers have opened up in the last couple of years.

== Governance ==
Ingbirchworth was a township in the ancient parish of Penistone. Ingbirchworth was a civil parish from 1866 until 1 April 1938 when the parish was abolished and merged with Gunthwaite to form "Gunthwaite and Ingbirchworth". In 1931 the parish had a population of 274.

== See also ==
- Listed buildings in Gunthwaite and Ingbirchworth
