= Gunthwaite and Ingbirchworth =

Civil parish in South Yorkshire, England

Coordinates: 53°33′00″N 1°39′25″W

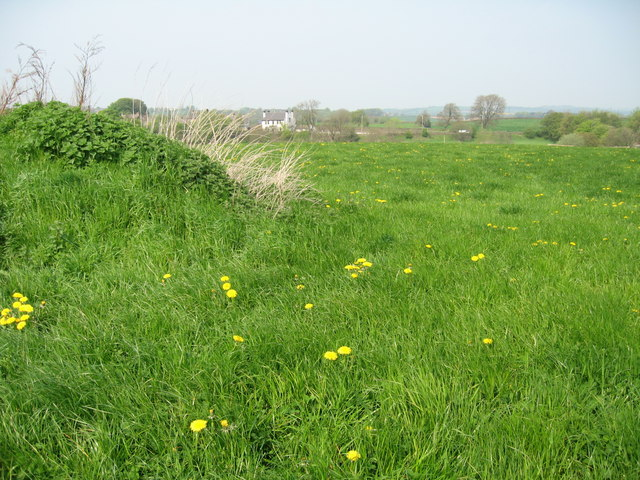

- Location within South Yorkshire
- Population: 460 (2011 census)
- Civil parish: Gunthwaite and Ingbirchworth
- Metropolitan borough: Barnsley
- Metropolitan county: South Yorkshire
- Region: Yorkshire and the Humber
- Country: England
- Sovereign state: United Kingdom
- Post town: Sheffield
- Postcode district: S36
- Dialling code: 01226

Gunthwaite and Ingbirchworth is a civil parish in the Barnsley district, in the county of South Yorkshire, England. It contains the hamlet of Gunthwaite and the village of Ingbirchworth. At the 2001 Census, the parish had a population of 400, increasing to 460 at the 2011 Census, and now estimated to be around 600.

== See also ==
- Listed buildings in Gunthwaite and Ingbirchworth
