= Spaw Sunday =

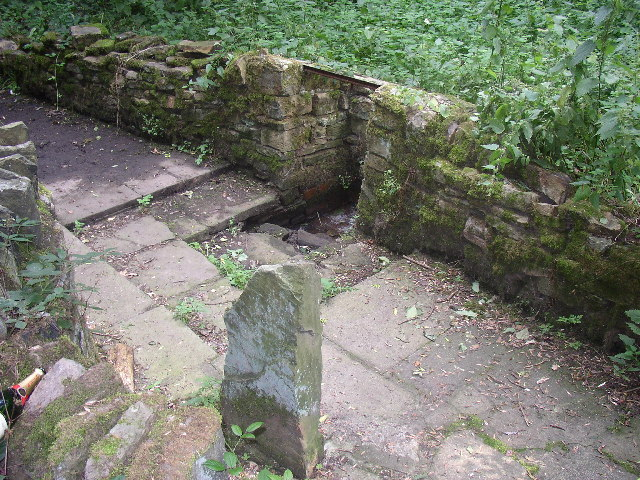
Gunthwaite Spa

Spaw Sunday, or Spa Sunday, is a celebration held on the first Sunday in May and peculiar to Yorkshire and, formerly, Lancashire. It is focused on local holy wells or spas whose spring waters are believed to have restorative or healing properties only on that day. Celebrations usually include a short pilgrimage from the local church to the spring, and a blessing of the waters by the clergy, after which the crowd take turns to smell or taste the usually highly sulphurous waters. Traditionally liquorice was steeped in a cup of collected waters, or shaken in a bottle of same, to sweeten the taste. Though it is not officially recommended to drink the waters, watching others react to the strong taste is part of the spectacle. Dock pudding is served at the Calderdale events.

The practice was common up until the early part of the 20th century but nearly died out. In a few places it has been successfully revived in recent years and the day's events are accompanied by brass bands, long sword dancing, or similar traditional displays, at:

- Midgley, Calderdale, West Yorkshire: the most popular
- Cragg Vale, Calderdale, West Yorkshire: not far from Midgley
- Gunthwaite, Penistone, South Yorkshire: some 25 miles from the other spas

There may once have been similar festivities around St Helen's Well, Holywell Green, Calderdale, West Yorkshire.
