= Nathaniel Wraxall =

British politician and historian (1751–1831)

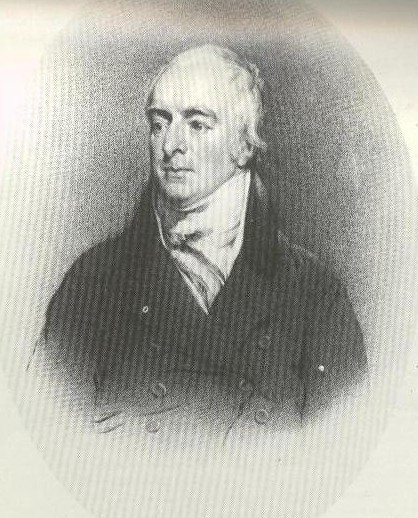
Nathaniel William Wraxall

Sir Nathaniel William Wraxall, 1st Baronet (8 April 1751 – 7 November 1831) was a British Tory politician and historian.

== Life ==
He was born in Queen Square, Bristol, the son of a Bristol merchant, Nathaniel Wraxall, and his wife Anne, great-niece of Sir James Thornhill, the painter. He entered the employment of the East India Company in 1769, and served as judge-advocate and paymaster during the expeditions against Gujarat and Bharuch in 1771. In the following year he left the service of the company and returned to Europe.

He visited Portugal and was presented to the court, of which he gives a curious account in his Historical Memoirs. In the north of Europe he made the acquaintance of several Danish nobles who had been exiled for their support of the deposed Queen Caroline Matilda, sister of George III. Among them were notably Baron Frederik Ludvig Ernst Bülow (spouse of Anna Sofie Bülow), and Count Ernst Schimmelmann (son of Caroline von Schimmelmann).

Wraxall at their suggestion undertook to endeavour to persuade the king to act on her behalf. He was able to secure an interview with her at Celle Castle in September 1774. His exertions are told in his Posthumous Memoirs. As the queen died on 11 May 1775, his schemes came to nothing and he complained that he was out-of-pocket, but George III took no notice of him for some time. In 1775 he published his first book, Cursory Remarks made in a Tour through some of the Northern Parts of Europe, which reached its fourth edition by 1807, when it was renamed A Tour Round the Baltic. In 1777 he travelled again in Germany and Italy. As he had by this time secured the patronage of important people, he obtained a complimentary lieutenant's commission from the king on the application of Lord Robert Manners, which gave him the right to wear uniform though he never performed any military service. He published his Memoirs of the Kings of France of the Race of Valois, to which he appended an account of his tour in the Western, Southern and Interior Provinces of France. In 1778 he went again on his travels to Germany and Italy, and accumulated materials for his Memoirs of the Courts of Berlin, Dresden, Warsaw and Vienna (1799).

In 1780, Wraxall entered Parliament in the Tory interest, and served as a Member for years. He was first elected from Hindon in Wiltshire. On 3 April 1784, he was elected from Ludgershall. He was still a supporter of Pitt when he was elected for Wallingford on 16 June 1790. He was defeated at a by-election in March 1794 by Francis Sykes.

Wraxall then immediately began work on his French history in order to publish it the following year. He completed the beginning of a History of France from the Accession of Henry III to the Death of Louis XIV, but it was never completed.

Little is known of his later years except that he was made a baronet by the Prince Regent on 21 December 1813. His Historical Memoirs appeared in 1815, when he subsequently removed to Wraxall House, Charlton Kings, near Cheltenham. Both they and the Posthumous Memoirs (1836) are very readable and have real historical value. Wraxall believed that the government of the day, furious at his truthfulness, was behind a libel action which sent him to prison for three months in 1816. Hence the posthumous publication of the later memoirs. He died suddenly at Dover on 7 November 1831, while travelling to Naples.

== Family ==
Wraxall married Miss Jane Lascelles, daughter of Peter Lascelles, in 1789. They had two sons, Lieutenant-colonel William Lascelles Wraxall, second baronet (1791–1863), and Lt. Charles Edward Wraxall RA (1792–1854), the father of Sir Frederic Charles Lascelles Wraxall (1828–1865), who was a miscellaneous writer.

== Notes ==
Parliament of Great Britain
Preceded by Henry Dawkins; Archibald Macdonald	Member of Parliament for Hindon; 1780–1784; With: Lloyd Kenyon	Succeeded by William Egerton; Edward Bearcroft
Preceded by Sir Peniston Lamb; George Augustus Selwyn	Member of Parliament for Ludgershall; 1784–1790; With: George Augustus Selwyn	Succeeded by William Harbord; George Augustus Selwyn
Preceded by Thomas Aubrey; Sir Francis Sykes, Bt	Member of Parliament for Wallingford; 1790–1794; With: Sir Francis Sykes, Bt	Succeeded by Sir Francis Sykes, Bt; Francis Sykes (2)
Baronetage of the United Kingdom
New creation	Baronet (of Wraxall); 1813–1831	Succeeded by William Wraxall
