= Sir James Macdonald, 6th Baronet =

Scottish clan chief (d. 1723)

Sir James Macdonald, 6th Baronet (died 1723) was a Scottish Chief of Clan Macdonald of Sleat.

== Early life ==
Macdonald was a younger son of Sir Donald Macdonald, 3rd Baronet and Lady Mary Douglas. Among his siblings was elder brother, Sir Donald Macdonald, 4th Baronet, who participated in the Jacobite rising of 1689 and 1715.

His paternal grandparents were Sir James Mor Macdonald, 2nd Baronet and Margaret Mackenzie. His maternal grandparents were Robert Douglas, 8th Earl of Morton and the former Anne Villiers (a daughter of Sir Edward Villiers).

== Career ==
Upon the death of his nephew, Donald in 1720, he succeeded as the 6th Baronet Macdonald, of Sleat, in the Isle of Skye, County Inverness, which had been created in the Baronetage of Nova Scotia in 1625. He lived at Oransay, Scotland.

== Personal life ==
Macdonald married Janet (née Macleod) Macleod, a widow of John Macleod, 2nd of Talisker, and daughter of Alasdair MacLeod, 2nd of Grishornish and Margaret MacQueen. Before her death, they were the parents of:

- Margaret Macdonald, who married Sir Robert Douglas, 6th Baronet, son of Sir Robert Douglas, 4th Baronet, in c. 1738.
- Isabel Macdonald, who died unmarried.
- Janet Macdonald, who married Sir Alexander Mackenzie, 5th Baronet, son of Sir Colin Mackenzie, 4th Baronet.
- Sir Alexander Macdonald, 7th Baronet (1711–1746), who married Anne Erskine, daughter of David Erskine, in 1733. After her death, he married Lady Margaret Montgomerie, daughter of Alexander Montgomerie, 9th Earl of Eglinton, in 1739.

After her death, he married Margaret Macdonald, daughter of John Macdonald. Together, they were the parents of:

- John Macdonald, who died young.

Sir James died in 1723 at Forres, Morayshire, and was succeeded in the baronetcy by his eldest surviving son, Alexander.

Baronetage of Nova Scotia
Preceded by Donald Macdonald	Baronet (of Sleat); 1720–1723	Succeeded by Alexander Macdonald
