= Frederic Charles Lascelles Wraxall =

English writer and translator (1828–1865)

Sir Frederic Charles Lascelles Wraxall, 3rd Baronet (1828 – 11 June 1865), was a miscellaneous writer.

== Life ==
He was educated at Shrewsbury, where he was Dyke scholar, and matriculated from St Mary Hall, Oxford, on 26 May 1842, but left the university without graduating. In May 1863 he succeeded his uncle, Sir William Lascelles Wraxall, as third baronet.

From 1846, he spent the greater part of his life on the continent. In 1855 he served for nine months at Kerch in the Crimea as first-class assistant commissary, with the rank of captain, in the Turkish contingent. His experiences during this period are depicted in his Camp Life: Passages from the Story of a Contingent (1860). Before going to the Crimea he had issued "A Visit to the Seat of War in the North", a brochure which purported to be a translation from the German, but was probably original. Wraxall continued to interest himself in military matters. In 1856 he issued A Handbook to the Naval and Military Resources of European Nations; in 1859 The Armies of the Great Powers; and in 1864 a volume called Military Sketches, which was chiefly concerned with the French army and its leaders, but had also chapters on the Austrian army, the British soldier, and "The Chances of Invasion".

In 1858, he led the Naval and Military Gazette, and from January 1860 to March 1861 The Welcome Guest, and he sent frequent contributions to the St. James Magazine and other periodicals. In 1860 he edited for private circulation the Persian and Indian dispatches of Sir James Outram. He was well versed in modern history, more particularly that of France and Germany during the last two centuries. His Memoirs of Queen Hortense, written in collaboration with Robert Wehran (1861, 2 vols. 8vo; reissued in 1864), is little more than a compilation of gossip, but Historic Byeways, two volumes of essays reprinted from periodicals, shows extensive reading. Besides other stories of German, French, and Russian history is Mr. Carlyle's latest Pet, a hostile criticism of the characters drawn by that historian of Frederick William I, based upon the recently published Aus vier Jahrhunderten of Karl von Weber.

Wraxall's most important historical work was The Life and Times of Caroline Matilda, Queen of Denmark and Norway (1864, 3 vols. 8vo.). He claimed to have shown by original research the worthlessness of the evidence on which the queen was divorced after the Struensee affair, and published for the first time (iii. 252–3) the letter protesting her innocence, which the queen wrote just before her death to her brother George III of the United Kingdom. He obtained through the Duchess of Augustenburg a copy of the original in the Hanoverian archives, and through Sir Augustus Paget was afforded access to the privy archives of Copenhagen. He also used the privately printed Memoirs of the Landgrave Charles of Hesse-Cassel (brother-in-law of Christian VII of Denmark), the Memoirs of Reverdil (secretary to Christian), and the private journals of Sir N. W. Wraxall. The English foreign office remained closed to him.

== Works ==
Wraxall published several novels. They include:

- Wild Oats: a Tale, 1858, 12mo; 1865, 8vo.
- Only a Woman: a Story in Neutral Tint, 1860, 8vo; 1861, 8vo.
- The Fife and Drum, or, Would be a Soldier, 1862, 8vo.
- Married in Haste: a Story of Everyday Life, 1863, 2 vols. 8vo.
- The Black Panther, or, A Boy's Adventures among the Redskins, 1863, 8vo; Boston, 1865, 16mo.
- The Backwoodsman, or, Life on the Indian Frontier, (illustrated), 1864, 8vo; 1871, 8vo.
- Golden Hair: a Tale of the Pilgrim Fathers, (illustrated), 1864, 8vo.
- Mercedes: a Romance of the Mexican war, 1865, 3 vols.
- Fides, or the Beauty of Mayence, (adapted from the German), 1865, 3 vols.

He was author also of:

- Remarkable Adventures and Unrevealed Mysteries, 1863, 2 vols. 8vo, containing articles on Struensee, Königsmark, D'Acon, Cagliostro, Clootz, and other adventurers;
- Criminal Celebrities, a collection of Memorable Trials, 1861, 8vo;
- The Second Empire as exhibited in French Literature, 1852–63, 2 vols. 8vo; 1865.

In 1862, he made the authorised British translation of Victor Hugo's Les Misérables, which was reissued in 1864 and 1879. He made many other translations from French and German. A posthumous volume, collected from magazines, entitled Scraps and Sketches gathered together, appeared in September 1865.

== Personal ==
Wraxall was born at Boulogne, France, in 1828, was the eldest son of Charles Edward Wraxall (1792–1854), lieutenant royal artillery, by Ellen Cecilia, daughter of John Madden of Richmond, Surrey. His grandfather was Sir Nathaniel Wraxall.

Wraxall married, in 1852, Mary Anne, daughter of J. Herring, esq. She died without issue on 27 November 1882. He died at Vienna on 11 June 1865. The baronetcy passed successively to Wraxall's younger brothers, Sir Horatio Henry (1832-1882) and Sir Morville Nathaniel Wraxall (1834–1898), the fifth baronet.

Baronetage of the United Kingdom
Preceded by William Wraxall	Baronet (of Wraxall); 1863–1865	Succeeded by Horatio Wraxall
