= Judge McDonald =

Judge McDonald may refer to:

- Alan Angus McDonald (1927–2007), judge of the United States District Court for the Eastern District of Washington
- David McDonald (judge) (1803–1869), judge of the United States District Court for the District of Indiana
- Gabrielle Kirk McDonald (born 1942), judge of the International Criminal Tribunal for the Former Yugoslavia

== See also ==
- Justice McDonald (disambiguation)
