= Macdonald River =

Macdonald River may refer to:

- Macdonald River (Bendemeer), New South Wales, Australia
- Macdonald River (St Albans), New South Wales, Australia
- MacDonald River (Métabetchouane River tributary), Quebec, Canada
- MacDonald River (Côte-Nord), Quebec, Canada

== See also ==
- Macdonald (disambiguation)
