= Godfrey Macdonald, 3rd Baron Macdonald =

Scottish aristocrat (1775–1832)

Lieutenant-General The Right Honourable The Lord Macdonald
- Born: 14 October 1775; Edinburgh
- Died: 13 October 1832 (aged 56); Bridlington
- Burial place: Rudston
- Education: Harrow School; Oriel College, Oxford
- Military career
- Allegiance: United Kingdom
- Branch: British Army
- Service years: 1794–1814
- Rank: Lieutenant-general
- Unit: 1/1st Foot Guards
- Commands: 1/24th Regiment of Foot
- Conflicts: French Revolutionary Wars; Expedition to Ostend; Napoleonic Wars; Battle of Blaauwberg; Peninsular War; Battle of the Bidassoa; Battle of Nivelle; Battle of the Nive

Lieutenant-General Godfrey Bosville Macdonald, 3rd Baron Macdonald (14 October 1775 – 13 October 1832) was a Scottish aristocrat.

== Early life ==
Godfrey was born on 14 October 1775 in Edinburgh, Scotland. He was the second of seven sons and three daughters born to the former Elizabeth Diana Bosville (1748–1789) and Sir Alexander Macdonald, 9th Baronet (c. 1745–1795). In 1776, the year following his birth, his father was created Baron Macdonald in the Peerage of Ireland. His elder brother, Alexander, was MP for Saltash who held his seat in the House of Commons after succeeding to the barony in 1795 as it was an Irish peerage which did not entitle him to a seat in the House of Lords.

His father, a younger son of Lady Margaret Montgomerie (a daughter of the 9th Earl of Eglinton) and Sir Alexander Macdonald, 7th Baronet, had succeeded to the baronetcy in 1766 following the death of his elder brother, Sir James Macdonald, 8th Baronet. His mother was the eldest daughter of Godfrey Bosville IV of Gunthwaite and of Thorpe Hall, Rudston, both in Yorkshire.

He was educated at Harrow School, Harrow on the Hill, London, England. He matriculated Oriel College, University of Oxford, Oxford, Oxfordshire, England, on 17 December 1792.

== Career ==
He gained the rank of ensign, in 1794, serving in the Loyal Kelso Regiment and the King's Royal Rifle Corps. He then gained the rank of captain, in 1796, serving in the 86th Regiment of Foot and the rank of lieutenant, that same year, while serving with the 70th (Surrey) Regiment of Foot. He then gained the ranks of major, in the service of the 55th Regiment of Foot, and lieutenant-colonel, in the service of the South Wales Borderers. He gained the rank of lieutenant-colonel in 1808 in the service of the Grenadier Guards. He gained the ranks of brevet colonel, in 1811, the rank of major-general, in 1814, and of lieutenant-general, in 1830.

He fought in the expedition to Ostend in 1798 and then in the British West Indies from 1801 to 1802. He fought in the recapture of the Cape of Good Hope between 1805 and 1806, under Sir David Baird, 1st Baronet. He fought in the Peninsular War in 1812.

=== Titles and name changes ===
He was the heir of his uncle William Bosville who died unmarried in 1813, having left him nearly the whole of his fortune and estates, including Gunthwaite in Yorkshire. In accordance with the terms of the bequest, by royal licence on 11 April 1814 he changed his surname to Bosville and later on 20 July 1824 to Bosville-Macdonald.

Following the death of his elder brother Alexander Macdonald, 2nd Baron Macdonald on 19 June 1824, Godfrey succeeded to his father's titles after his brother died unmarried and without legitimate issue.

== Personal life ==
On 29 December 1803, Macdonald married Louisa Maria La Coast (1781–1835). She is said to have been the illegitimate daughter of Prince William Henry, Duke of Gloucester and Edinburgh (a son of Frederick, Prince of Wales and a younger brother of King George III) and his mistress, Lady Almeria Carpenter (a daughter of the 1st Earl of Tyrconnell), although she was baptised at Leatherhead in 1781 as the daughter of Farley Edser (a steward to the Duke of Gloucester who was a tenant of a dairy farm near Hampton Court). Together, they were the parents of thirteen children, including:

- Alexander William Robert Bosville (1800–1847), de jure 12th Baronet, who married Matilda Eliza Moffat Bayard, a daughter of Col. John Bayard.
- William Macdonald (1801–c. 1805), who died young.
- Louisa Bosville Macdonald (1802–1854), who married John Hope, 5th Earl of Hopetoun.
- Hon. Elizabeth Diana Bosville Macdonald (1804–1839), who married Duncan Davidson, 4th of Tulloch, a son of Henry Davidson of Tulloch, in 1825.
- Hon. Julia Bosville Macdonald (1805–1884), who married the Rev. Charles Walter Hudson, a son of Harrington Hudson (MP for Helston) and Lady Anne Townshend (a daughter of the 1st Marquess Townshend), in 1838.
- Hon. Susan Hussey Bosville Macdonald (1807–1879), who married Capt. Richard Beaumont, son of Col. Thomas Richard Beaumont (MP for Northumberland), in 1832.
- Godfrey William Wentworth Bosville-Macdonald, 4th Baron Macdonald (1809–1863), who married Maria Anne Wyndham, eldest daughter and co-heiress of George Thomas Wyndham, of Cromer Hall, Norfolk, in 1845. Her sister, Cecilia, married Lord Alfred Paget (a son of the 1st Marquess of Anglesey).
- Hon. James William Bosville Macdonald (1810–1882), a Lieutenant-General who was Aide-de-camp, Equerry and Private Secretary to Prince George, Duke of Cambridge; he married Hon. Elizabeth Nina Blake, daughter of Joseph Blake, 3rd Baron Wallscourt, in 1859.
- Hon. Diana Bosville Macdonald (1812–1880), who married John George Smyth, MP for City of York who was a son of John Henry Smyth (MP for Cambridge University) and Lady Elizabeth FitzRoy (a daughter of the 4th Duke of Grafton), in 1837.
- Hon. Jane Bosville Macdonald (1815–1888), who died unmarried.
- Hon. Marianne Bosville Macdonald (1816–1876), who married Capt. Henry Martin Turnor, a son of Edmund Turnor, in 1840.
- Hon. William Bosville Macdonald (1817–1847), who married Sophia Keppel.
- Hon. Octavia Sophia Bosville Macdonald (c. 1819–1897), who married William James Hope Johnstone, the eldest son of John Hope-Johnstone, de jure 7th Earl of Annandale and Hartfell, in 1841.

Three of his children with Louisa were born before their marriage, so they were considered illegitimate, while the ten children born after their marriage were considered legitimate. The eldest three were eventually legitimized by Scottish law, but not by Irish law, therefore, the Scottish baronetcy passed to his eldest son, Alexander, while the Irish barony passed to his third son, Godfrey.

Lord Macdonald died on 13 October 1832 at Bridlington, in England. His widow, the dowager Lady Macdonald, died on 10 February 1835, at Bossall, Yorkshire.

=== Descendants ===
Through his eldest son Alexander, he was a grandfather of Godfrey Wentworth Bayard Bosville, de jure 13th Baronet, who married Hon. Harriet Cassandra Willoughby (sister to the 8th Baron Middleton); and Hon. Julia Louisa Bosville (1824–1901), who married Henry Willoughby, 8th Baron Middleton.

Through his eldest daughter Louisa, Countess of Hopetoun, he is a direct ancestor of the Marquesses of Linlithgow.

Through his daughter Diana, he was a grandfather of Diana Smyth, who married Henry Lascelles, 4th Earl of Harewood.

Through his daughter Marianne, he was a grandfather of Henrietta Turnor, who married John Scott, 3rd Earl of Eldon.

Through his youngest daughter Octavia, he was posthumously a grandfather of John Hope Johnstone, de jure 8th Earl of Annandale and Hartfell.

Peerage of Ireland
Preceded by Alexander Macdonald	Baron Macdonald; 1824–1832	Succeeded by Godfrey Bosville-Macdonald
Baronetage of Nova Scotia
Preceded by Alexander Macdonald	Baronet (of Sleat); 1824–1832	Succeeded by Alexander Macdonald
