= Sir Archibald Macdonald, 3rd Baronet =

English cricketer and British Army officer

Personal information
- Full name: Archibald Keppel Macdonald
- Born: 15 October 1820; London, England
- Died: 28 March 1901 (aged 80); Liphook, Hampshire, England
- Batting: Unknown

Domestic team information
- Years: Team
- 1841: Marylebone Cricket Club

Career statistics
Competition	First-class
Matches	1
Runs scored	0
Batting average	0.00
100s/50s	–/–
Top score	0
Catches/stumpings	1/–
- Source: Cricinfo, 21 April 2021

Sir Archibald Keppel Macdonald, 3rd Baronet (15 October 1820 – 28 March 1901) was an English first-class cricketer and British Army officer.

The son of Sir James Macdonald and Lady Sophia Keppel, daughter of William Keppel, 4th Earl of Albemarle, he was born at London in October 1820. He was educated at Harrow School. His father died in June 1832, with Macdonald succeeding him as the 3rd Baronet at the age of 12.

Macdonald joined the British Army in November 1839, when he purchased the ranks of ensign and lieutenant in the Royal Scots Fusiliers. Macdonald played a single first-class cricket match for the Marylebone Cricket Club (MCC) against Cambridge University at Fenner's in 1841. Batting once in the MCC first innings, he was dismissed without scoring by William de St Croix; he was absent hurt in their second innings. He later purchased the ranks of lieutenant and captain in November 1845. Macdonald retired from active service in March 1849.

He was appointed a deputy lieutenant of Hampshire in April 1853, and later served as High Sheriff of Hampshire in February 1865. Other duties during his life included being Page of Honour to William IV and equerry to the Duke of Sussex, in addition to being a justice of the peace for both Hampshire and Surrey.

Macdonald was twice married, firstly to Lady Margaret Sophia Coke (c. 1829–1868), daughter of the 1st Earl of Leicester and Anne Amelia Keppel, daughter of William Keppel, 4th Earl of Albemarle, his cousin. He had no issue with Lady Margaret, but did have an illegitimate son, Archibald Godfrey MacDonald, with Charlotte Chamberlain in 1849. His second wife was Catherine Mary Coulthurst, whom he married in 1869 and had two children; a son and a daughter. Macdonald died in March 1901 at Liphook, at which point he was succeeded as the 4th Baronet by his legitimate son Sir Archibald John Macdonald.

Baronetage of the United Kingdom
Preceded by Sir James Macdonald	Baronet (of East Sheen); 1832–1901	Succeeded by Sir Archibald Macdonald
