= Donald of Castleton =

Scottish soldier

Colonel Donald Macdonald (born 1624) was a Scottish soldier.

He was born the son of Sir Donald Gorme Macdonald, 8th Laird of Sleat, and 1st Baronet, and his wife Janet. A distinguished soldier who commanded the Clan Uisdein contingent at the battle of Killiecrankie, he obtained, either by tack or wadset, the lands of Castleton, Knock, Totamurich, and Camuscross, and of these he obtained a new wadset from his brother, Sir James Mor Macdonald, 2nd Baronet, in 1665.

He likewise held the lands of Ord, Croswaig, Tockvaig, and Tarsgavaig, also in the barony of Sleat. In 1691, he appears on the Valuation Roll of Inverness as a landowner in the county.

== Marriage and children ==
He married Margaret, daughter of John Cameron of Lochiel, and was succeeded by his son Ranald.
