= Sir George Macpherson-Grant, 1st Baronet =

Sir George Macpherson-Grant, 1st Baronet (1781–1846), of Ballindalloch, Banff and Invereshie, Inverness, Scotland, was a politician.

He was a Member of Parliament (MP) for Sutherland 29 September 1809 – 1812 and 6 March 1816 – 1826.

Macpherson Grant inherited the Ballindalloch estate in Banffshire from General James Grant in 1806 and the Invereshie estate in Badenoch from his uncle William Macpherson (1733 - 1812) in 1812.

Parliament of the United Kingdom
Preceded by John Randoll Mackenzie	Member of Parliament for Sutherland; 1809–1812	Succeeded by James Macdonald
Preceded by James Macdonald	Member of Parliament for Sutherland; 1816–1826	Succeeded by Lord Francis Leveson-Gower
Baronetage of the United Kingdom
New creation	Baronet of Ballindalloch; 1838–1846	Succeeded by John Macpherson-Grant
