= Macpherson-Grant baronets =

Extinct baronetcy in the Baronetage of the United Kingdom

The Macpherson-Grant baronetcy, of Ballindalloch in the County of Elgin, was a title in the Baronetage of the United Kingdom. It was created on 25 July 1838 for George Macpherson-Grant, Member of Parliament for Sutherland intermittently from 1809 to 1826. The 3rd Baronet was MP for Elginshire and Nairnshire from 1879 to 1886, and was also deputy lieutenant of Elginshire, Inverness-shire and Banffshire.

== Macpherson-Grant baronets, of Ballindalloch (1838) ==
- Sir George Macpherson-Grant, 1st Baronet FRSE (1781–1846), MP for Sutherland
- Sir John Macpherson-Grant, 2nd Baronet (1804–1850)
- Sir George Macpherson-Grant, 3rd Baronet (1839–1907)
- Sir John Macpherson-Grant, 4th Baronet (1863–1914)
- Sir George Macpherson-Grant, 5th Baronet (1890–1951)
- Sir Ewan George Macpherson-Grant, 6th Baronet (1907–1983)

== Coat of arms ==
Coat of arms of Macpherson-Grant baronets
Crest 1st: a dexter hand erect holding a dirk in pale proper; 2nd: a cat sejant-guardant proper with fore-foot erect. Escutcheon Quarterly: 1st and 4th, gules, a target between three antique crowns or (Grant of Ballindalloch); 2nd and 3rd, per fesse or and azure a lymphad of the first, masts, oars, and tacking proper, ensigned gules between a hand couped fessewise holding a dagger in pale in the dexter, and in the sinister a cross-crosslet fitchee gules, all within a bordure of the last (Macpherson of Invereshie). Supporters Dexter, a naked man proper wreathed about the loins and in his exterior hand a club; sinister, a Highlander armed with a steel cap on his head, a target on his interior arm, and a drawn broadsword in his exterior hand. Motto 1st: Ense et animo (With sword and courage); 2nd: Touch not the cat but a glove

Baronetage of the United Kingdom
Preceded by Boileau baronets	Macpherson-Grant baronets of Ballindalloch; 25 July 1838	Succeeded by Howard baronets
