= Max Reinhardt (publisher) =

British book publisher (1915–2002)

- Born: 30 November 1915; Istanbul, Ottoman Empire
- Died: 19 November 2002 (aged 86); Richmond-upon-Thames, London, England
- Education: London School of Economics
- Occupation: Publisher
- Employer: The Bodley Head
- Spouses: Margaret Leighton (m. 1947; div. 1955) Joan MacDonald (m. 1957)

Max Reinhardt (30 November 1915 – 19 November 2002) was a British publisher. He published Aleksandr I. Solzhenitsyn, George Bernard Shaw and Graham Greene.

== Biography ==
Max Reinhardt was born on 30 November 1915 in Istanbul. He attended an English High School in Istanbul. He published Ellen Terry and Bernard Shaw: A Correspondence in 1952. Reinhardt died on 19 November 2002 at the age of 86.
