= MCD =

MCD, Mcd or mcd may refer to:

== Science ==
- Magnetic circular dichroism, with polarized light
- Malonyl-CoA decarboxylase, an enzyme involved in fatty acid biosynthesis
- Mesoscale convective discussion, Storm Prediction Center forecast
- Millicandela (mcd) or Megacandela (Mcd), units of brightness or light intensity

=== Medical ===
- Minimal change disease, a disease of the kidney
- Multicentric Castleman's disease, a sub-type of Castleman's disease

== Technology ==
- Magnetic chip detector, in engines
- Maxi single or Maxi single Compact Disc
- Mega-CD, a console by Sega
- Memory Cache Die
- Mini compact disc
- .mcd, a Mathcad document file

== Transportation ==
- Mackinac Island Airport (IATA airport code), in Michigan, US
- Macleod railway station, Melbourne
- Merced station (Amtrak) (station code), California, US
- Moscow Central Diameters, commuter rail system in Moscow, Russia

== Organizations ==
- MCD Productions, an Irish event promoter
- MCD, an imprint of Farrar, Straus and Giroux
- McDonald's, restaurant chain, NYSE stock ticker
- Melbourne College of Divinity
- Monte Carlo Doualiya, a French public radio service in the Middle East
- Municipal Corporation of Delhi

== Other uses ==
- 1400 (Roman numerals)
- M Countdown, a South Korean music TV program
- Minecraft Dungeons, a video game
- Minor civil division, a geographical term used by the United States Census Bureau
- North Macedonia (UNDP code: MCD), a sovereign state in Europe

== See also ==
- Measurement, Calibration and Diagnosis, with the Association for Standardisation of Automation and Measuring Systems
