= Baron Macdonald =

Title in the Peerage of Ireland

Barony of MacDonald
- Quarterly: 1st, Argent a Lion rampant Gules armed and langued Azure; 2nd, Or a Hand in armour fesswise couped at the elbow proper holding a Cross Crosslet fitchy Gules; 3rd, Or a Lymphad sails furled and oars in action Sable flagged Gules; 4th, Vert a Salmon naiant in fess proper; over all (as Chief of the Name and Arms of Macdonald) on an Inescutcheon en surtout Or an Eagle displayed Gules surmounted of a Lymphad sails furled and oars in action Sable
- Creation date: 17 July 1776
- Created by: King George III
- Peerage: Peerage of Ireland
- First holder: Sir Alexander Macdonald, 9th Baronet, of Sleat
- Present holder: Godfrey James Macdonald, 8th Baron Macdonald
- Heir apparent: The Hon. Godfrey Evan Hugo Thomas Macdonald, Younger of Macdonald
- Subsidiary titles: Chief of the Name and Arms of Macdonald of Macdonald; High Chief of Clan Donald
- Status: Extant
- Seat: Kinloch Lodge

Baron Macdonald, of Slate in the County of Antrim, is a title in the Peerage of Ireland. It was created in 1776 for Sir Alexander Macdonald, 9th Baronet, of Sleat. The Macdonald family of Sleat descends from Uisdean Macdonald (died 1498), also known as Hugh of Sleat, or Hugh Macdonald, who was an illegitimate son of Alexander Macdonald, Earl of Ross. On 28 May 1625, his great-great-great-great-grandson Donald Gorm Og Macdonald (not to be confused with Donald Gorm, Hugh's great grandson) was created a baronet, of Sleat in the Isle of Skye in the County of Inverness, in the Baronetage of Nova Scotia. The baronetcy was created with remainder to heirs male whatsoever and with a special clause of precedence which provided that it should have precedency over all former baronets (Sir Robert Gordon excepted).

On 23 December 1716 the fourth baronet, Sir Donald MacDonald, was created Lord Sleat in the Jacobite peerage.

The first baronet's great-great-great-grandson, the ninth Baronet, was raised to the Peerage of Ireland as Baron Macdonald, of Slate in the County of Antrim, in 1776. Lord Macdonald married Elizabeth Diana Bosville, daughter of Godfrey Bosville. Their eldest son, the second Baron, represented Saltash in Parliament. He never married and was succeeded by his younger brother, the third Baron. He was a Lieutenant-General in the Army. In 1814 Lord Macdonald inherited the Bosville estates of Thorpe and Gunthwaite in Yorkshire through his mother, and assumed by Royal licence the surname of Bosville in lieu of Macdonald the same year. However, on inheriting the Macdonald estates on the death of his older brother in 1824 he resumed by Royal licence the surname of Macdonald after that of Bosville. In 1803 Lord Macdonald married, in an English ceremony, Louisa Maria la Coast, illegitimate daughter of Prince William Henry, Duke of Gloucester and Edinburgh (grandson of King George II). The couple had previously married in a Scottish ceremony in 1799. However, the validity of the Scottish marriage was disputed, and as a result the eldest son of Lord Macdonald born before his 1803 marriage, Alexander William Robert Bosville, was not allowed to succeed his father in the titles (this decision was later challenged; see below). He was therefore succeeded by his eldest son born after the 1803 marriage, the fourth Baron. His great-grandson, the seventh Baron, served as Lord Lieutenant of Inverness from 1952 to 1970. As of 2013 the barony is held by the latter's eldest son, the eighth Baron. He is Chief of the Name and Arms of Macdonald (see Clan Donald).

The family seat is Kinloch Lodge, near Sleat, Isle of Skye.

According to a decision by the Court of Session in June 1910, the children born before the 1803 marriage of the third Baron Macdonald were legitimate according to Scottish Law. However, this decision was only valid regarding the Nova Scotia baronetcy and not the Irish barony. As a result, the third Baron's rightful successor in the Baronetcy was his eldest son Alexander William Robert Bosville (the de jure twelfth Baronet). He had assumed by Royal licence the surname of Bosville in 1832 and had in 1847 inherited his father's Bosville estates in Yorkshire by Act of Parliament. His grandson, the de jure fourteenth Baronet, was recognised in the Baronetcy according to the aforementioned 1910 decision by the Court of Session. As of 2013 the baronetcy is held by the latter's great-grandson, the seventeenth Baronet.

The family seat is Thorpe Hall, near Rudston, Yorkshire.

== Barons Macdonald (1776) ==
- Alexander Macdonald, 1st Baron Macdonald (c. 1745–1795)
- Alexander Wentworth Macdonald, 2nd Baron Macdonald (1773–1824)
- Godfrey Macdonald, 3rd Baron Macdonald of Slate (1775–1832)
- Godfrey William Wentworth Bosville-Macdonald, 4th Baron Macdonald (1809–1863)
- Somerled James Brudenell Bosville-Macdonald, 5th Baron Macdonald (1849–1874)
- Ronald Archibald Bosville-Macdonald, 6th Baron Macdonald (1853–1947)
- Alexander Godfrey Macdonald, 7th Baron Macdonald (1909–1970)
- Godfrey James Macdonald, 8th Baron Macdonald (b.1947)

The heir apparent is the present holder's only son Hon. Godfrey Evan Hugo Thomas Macdonald, Younger of Macdonald (born 1982).

== See also ==
- Earl of Ross (1215 creation)
- Clan Donald
- Clan Macdonald of Sleat
