= Alexander Macdonald, 1st Baron Macdonald =

Scottish nobleman (c.1745–1795)

Brigadier-General The Right Honourable The Lord Macdonald of Slate DL
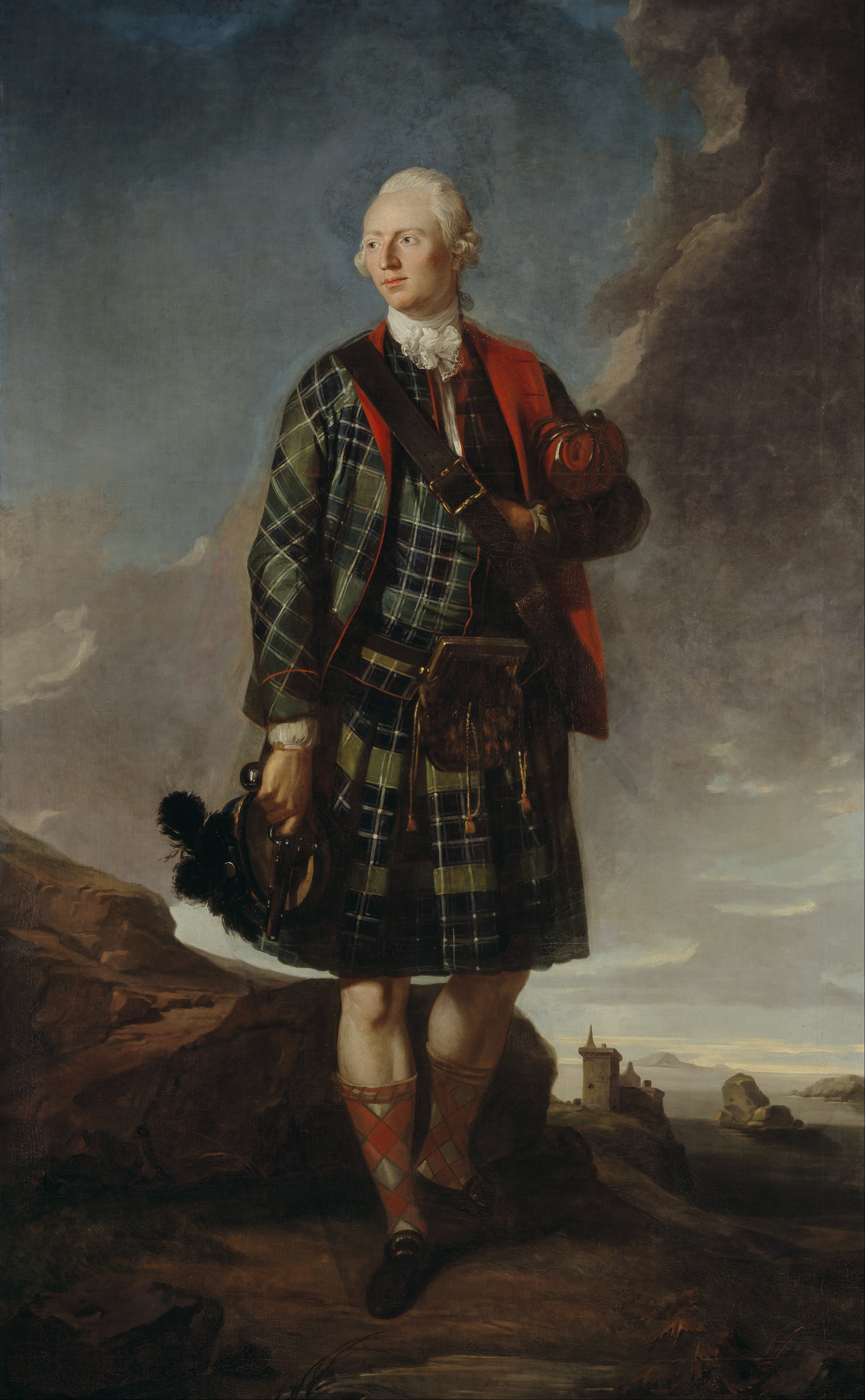
- Portrait of Lord Macdonald, attributed to Sir George Chalmers, now at the National Gallery of Scotland
- Born: c. 1745
- Died: 12 September 1795 (aged 49–50)
- Education: Eton College
- Spouse: Elizabeth Diana Bosville (m. 1768; died 1789)
- Parent(s): Sir Alexander Macdonald, 7th Baronet; Lady Margaret Montgomerie
- Relatives: Alexander Montgomerie, 9th Earl of Eglinton (grandfather)

Alexander Macdonald, 1st Baron Macdonald DL (c. 1745 – 12 September 1795) was a Scottish nobleman and Chief of Clan MacDonald of Sleat.

== Early life ==
Macdonald was the younger son of Sir Alexander Macdonald, 7th Baronet, and his wife Lady Margaret Montgomerie, a daughter of the 9th Earl of Eglinton.

He was educated at Eton and served with the Grenadier Guards.

== Career ==
Macdonald was also a Deputy Lieutenant of Inverness-shire and a brigadier-general in the Royal Company of Archers. He succeeded his elder brother in the baronetcy in 1766 and in 1776 he was raised to the Peerage of Ireland as Baron Macdonald, of Slate in the County of Antrim.

In 1778 he raised the MacDonald's Highlanders and was Brigadier-General in the Royal Company of Archers. Between 1794 and 1795, he raised another regiment from the Highlands and the Islands.

== Personal life ==
On 3 May 1768 Lord Macdonald married Elizabeth Diana Bosville (1748–1789) at St Giles in the Fields, London. She was the eldest daughter of Godfrey Bosville IV of Gunthwaite and of Thorpe Hall, Rudston, both in Yorkshire, and sister of the ardent Whig Colonel William Bosville (1745–1813). They had seven sons and three daughters, including:

- Hon. Diana Macdonald (1769–1845), who married Rt. Hon. Sir John Sinclair, 1st Baronet, son of George Sinclair of Ulbster, in 1788.
- Alexander Wentworth Macdonald, 2nd Baron Macdonald (1773–1824), an MP for Saltash who died unmarried.
- Godfrey Bosville Macdonald, 3rd Baron Macdonald (1775–1832), who married Louisa Maria La Coast, the illegitimate daughter of Prince William Henry, Duke of Gloucester and Edinburgh (a son of Frederick, Prince of Wales and a younger brother of King George III) and his mistress, Lady Almeria Carpenter (a daughter of the 1st Earl of Tyrconnell).
- Hon. Archibald Macdonald (1777–1861), who married Jane Campbell, daughter of Duncan Campbell of Arneave, in 1802.

Lady Macdonald died in 1789. Lord Macdonald survived her by six years and died in September 1795. He was succeeded in his titles by his son Alexander.

=== Descendants ===
Through his daughter Diana, he was a grandfather of thirteen grandchildren, including Sir George Sinclair, 2nd Baronet, a writer and an MP for Caithness who married Lady Catherine Camilla Tollemache; John Sinclair, who became Archdeacon of Middlesex; Capt. Archibald Sinclair of the Royal Navy; the Rev. William Sinclair, was Prebendary of Chichester (and was the father of Archdeacon of London William MacDonald Sinclair); and author Catherine Sinclair.

Peerage of Ireland
New creation	Baron Macdonald; 1776–1795	Succeeded by Alexander Wentworth Macdonald
Baronetage of Nova Scotia
Preceded by James Macdonald	Baronet (of Sleat); 1766–1795	Succeeded by Alexander Wentworth Macdonald
