= Sir James Mor Macdonald, 2nd Baronet =

Scottish nobleman and soldier

Sir James Mor Macdonald, 9th Laird of Sleat and 2nd Baronet (c.1605 – 8 December 1678) was a Scottish nobleman and soldier.

== Biography ==
Born the eldest son of Sir Donald Gorme Og Macdonald, he inherited his father's titles aged around 38 upon his death in 1643, becoming Chief of Clan Macdonald of Sleat. Alike his father who served under Charles I of England, Sir James initially fought as a Royalist in support of Charles II's claim to the British throne, including at the infamous Battle of Worcester in 1651. He had joined the cause in 1645, personally recruited by James Graham, 1st Marquess of Montrose after hesitation two years earlier when presented with a similar opportunity by Alasdair Mac Colla.

After the decisive victory for the Parliamentarians' New Model Army and the hasty escape of Charles II following Worcester, Macdonald negotiated a truce with the governing Committee of Estates; concerning his former comrades, but ultimately sparing his life. Retiring to the clan seat of Duntulm Castle on his entailed land on the Isle of Skye, Macdonald concentrated on public service and dismissed calls by allies to commit to further battle, leading a commission that apprehended the perpetrators of the Keppoch murders as well as fulfilling his duties as Sheriff of the Western Isles. Dying on 8 December 1678 at the age of around 73, the chieftaincy of the clan and baronetcy of Nova Scotia were inherited by Macdonald's eldest son, Sir Donald Macdonald, an ardent supporter of King James II and VII.

He was the son of Janet, commonly called "fair Janet," second daughter of Kenneth Mackenzie, 1st Lord Mackenzie of Kintail and Sir Donald Gorme Macdonald, 8th Laird of Sleat. James Mor Macdonald joined the Marquis of Montrose in 1645, and when Charles II of Scotland marched into England in 1651. He died on 8 December 1678.

Baronetage of Nova Scotia
Preceded by Donald Macdonald	Baronet (of Sleat); 1643–1678	Succeeded by Donald Macdonald
