= Alexander Macdonald, 2nd Baron Macdonald =

Scottish peer and Member of Parliament

Alexander Wentworth Macdonald, 2nd Baron Macdonald (9 December 1773 – 19 June 1824) was a Scottish peer and Member of Parliament.

Macdonald was the eldest son of Alexander Macdonald, 1st Baron Macdonald of Skye, Scotland, and his wife Elizabeth Diana (née Bosville). He succeeded his father to the barony in 1795 but, as this was an Irish peerage, it did not entitle him to a seat in the British House of Lords. The following year he was instead elected to the House of Commons for Saltash, a seat he held until 1802.

Lord Macdonald died in June 1824, aged 50. He never married and was succeeded in his titles by his younger brother, Godfrey Macdonald, 3rd Baron Macdonald of Sleat.

Parliament of Great Britain
| Preceded by William Stewart; Edward Bearcroft | Member of Parliament for Saltash; 1796 – 1801; With: Edward Bearcroft to December 1796; Charles Smith from December 1796 | Succeeded by Parliament of the United Kingdom |
Parliament of the United Kingdom
| Preceded by Parliament of Great Britain | Member of Parliament for Saltash; 1801 – 1802; With: Charles Smith | Succeeded by Matthew Russell; Robert Deverell |
Peerage of Ireland
| Preceded by Alexander Macdonald | Baron Macdonald; 1795–1824 | Succeeded by Godfrey Macdonald |
