= Gunthwaite =

Hamlet in South Yorkshire, England

Coordinates: 53°33′N 1°38′W

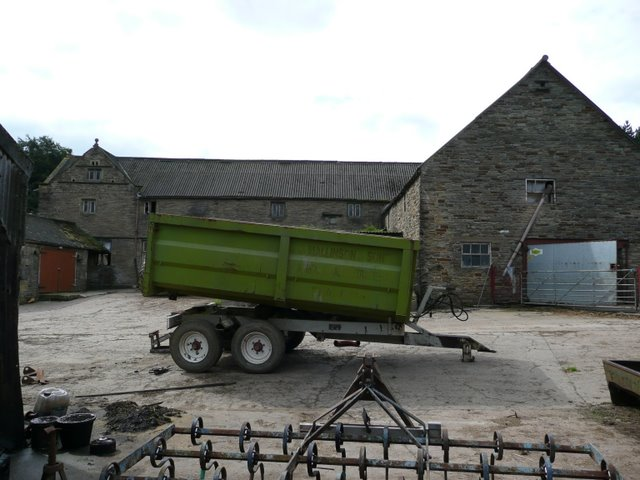
- Courtyard of Gunthwaite Hall

- Location within South Yorkshire
- OS grid reference: SE 242 060
- Civil parish: Gunthwaite and Ingbirchworth
- Metropolitan borough: Barnsley
- Metropolitan county: South Yorkshire
- Region: Yorkshire and the Humber
- Country: England
- Sovereign state: United Kingdom
- Post town: SHEFFIELD
- Postcode district: S36
- Dialling code: 01226
- Police: South Yorkshire
- Fire: South Yorkshire
- Ambulance: Yorkshire

Gunthwaite is a hamlet in the civil parish of Gunthwaite and Ingbirchworth, in the metropolitan borough of Barnsley in South Yorkshire, England. It is on the boundary of Kirklees in West Yorkshire. Until 1974 it was in the West Riding of Yorkshire.

The settlement can be traced back over 1,000 years.

The name Gunthwaite derives from the Old Norse Gunhildþveit meaning 'Gunhild's clearing'.

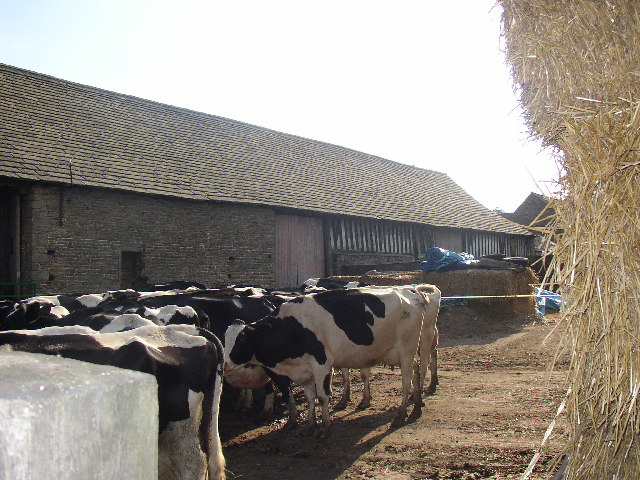
Gunthwaite Hall Barn

Within the parish is located Gunthwaite Hall, former seat of the Bosville family. Its 16th century Grade I listed close-studded cruck barn is still in agricultural use and has been described as "one of the glories of the parish". Also to be found nearby is Gunthwaite Spa, a sulphur-rich spring whose waters emerge from a pipe set in a stone recess by the side of Carr Lane. Here, the old practice of celebrating Spaw Sunday still survives to this day.

Gunthwaite was formerly a township in the parish of Penistone, in 1866 Gunthwaite became a separate civil parish, on 1 April 1938 the parish was abolished and merged with Ingbirchworth to form "Gunthwaite and Ingbirchworth". In 1931 the parish had a population of 64.

== See also ==
- Listed buildings in Gunthwaite and Ingbirchworth
