= Macdonald baronets =

Set index for Macdonald baronets

There have been two baronetcies created for members of the Macdonald family, one in the Baronetage of Nova Scotia and one in the Baronetage of the United Kingdom. One creation is extant.

- Macdonald baronets of Sleat (1625), later Bosville Macdonald baronets
- Macdonald baronets of East Sheen (1813)
