= Case of the Dean of St Asaph =

1784 trial in England

R v Shipley
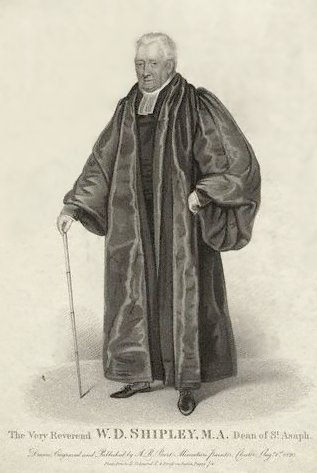
- William Davies Shipley, the defendant
- Court: King's Bench
- Full case name: Rex versus (or the Crown and/against) The Venerable William Davies Shipley
- Decided: 22 November 1784
- Citation: (1784) 4 Doug 73

Court membership
- Judges sitting: Lord Mansfield; Willes J Ashurst J

The Case of the Dean of St Asaph, formally R v Shipley, was the 1784 trial of William Davies Shipley, the Dean of St Asaph, for seditious libel. In the aftermath of the American War of Independence, electoral reform had become a substantial issue, and William Pitt the Younger attempted to bring a Bill before Parliament to reform the electoral system. In its support Shipley republished a pamphlet written by his brother-in-law, Sir William Jones, which noted the defects of the existing system and argued in support of Pitt's reforms. Thomas FitzMaurice, the brother of British Prime Minister the Earl of Shelburne, reacted by indicting Shipley for seditious libel, a criminal offence which acted as "the government's chief weapon against criticism", since merely publishing something that an individual judge interpreted as libel was enough for a conviction; a jury was prohibited from deciding whether the material was actually libellous. The law was widely seen as unfair, and a Society for Constitutional Information was formed to pay Shipley's legal fees. With financial backing from the society Shipley was able to secure the services of Thomas Erskine KC as his barrister.

Shipley was tried in 1784 by Mr Justice Buller and a specially convened jury at Shrewsbury. Edward Bearcroft, counsel for the prosecution, argued that on the basis of the existing system the jury could not decide on the nature of the pamphlet, while Erskine argued not only that they could, but that the material did not constitute seditious libel, containing as it did "a solemn protest against all sedition". Persuaded by Erskine's arguments, the jury ruled that Shipley was neither "guilty" or "not guilty", but instead "guilty of publication only", a confusing and non-standard ruling which, after a long dialogue, Mr Justice Buller declared to mean "guilty on all charges". Erskine appealed the decision to the Court of King's Bench on 8 November, where the judges again ruled that juries could not decide whether material was libellous, but nevertheless released Shipley on a technicality; his freedom was greeted with fireworks and bonfires, and Erskine was rewarded with the Freedom of the City of Gloucester. Still seeking to reform the law, Erskine sent the court records to Charles James Fox and Lord Camden, who, after much effort, passed the Libel Act 1792 (32 Geo. 3. c. 60), which secured the right of juries to decide whether material was libellous.

== Background ==
Following the end of the American War of Independence, British public attention had turned to the need for Parliamentary reform – specifically, the lack of franchise in many towns and the presence of rotten boroughs. In response, William Pitt the Younger brought the idea of reform before Parliament and, in support of his actions, Sir William Jones wrote and published a pamphlet titled A Dialogue between a Farmer and a Country Gentleman on the Principles of Government, which covered the "virtues of government and defects in the representation of the people". In 1783 Shipley, Jones's brother-in-law, recommended it to a group of Welsh constitutional reformers and had it reprinted in Welsh with his own preface suggesting it was "just, rational and constitutional". As a result, Thomas FitzMaurice, the brother of the Earl of Shelburne, indicted Shipley for seditious libel, specifically for "publishing a false, scandalous and malicious libel ... to raise seditions and tumults within the kingdom, and to excite His Majesty's subjects to attempt, by armed rebellion and violence, to subvert the state and constitution of the nation".

The law dealing with seditious libel was particularly strict. Acting as "the government's chief weapon against criticism", it followed principles laid down in De Libellis Famosis and R v Carr: that seditious libel was a criminal offence, that the intention of the publisher or the truth of the allegations was irrelevant, that mere publication was sufficient for a conviction, and that juries were only allowed to deliver a verdict on whether the material had been published by the defendant, not whether it was libellous. Traditionally, matters of fact were left to the jury and matters of law to the judge, but with seditious libel "matters of law" was construed very widely; it was the judge's job to decide if the material was libellous, what constituted "seditious libel", and the nature of "publication", which was understood to include almost anything. Even a private letter, if intercepted, could lead to a prosecution.

Because of public disquiet with these principles, Shipley's trial acted as a "test case" for the law of seditious libel; a Society for Constitutional Information was formed by concerned citizens and began raising money to pay for his defence. Able to afford the best representation, the society gave the brief to Thomas Erskine KC, a noted defence barrister. The trial was to be heard by Lord Kenyon, then Chief Justice of Chester, at Wrexham; after travelling 200 miles to the court Erskine discovered that a paper had been circulated in the area arguing that in libel cases juries were allowed to decide whether a publication was libellous, as well as whether it had been published. Citing the paper's circulation, the prosecution asked for a postponement; ignoring claims that a delay would cause Shipley hardship, Kenyon agree to postpone the trial. The case was eventually heard on 6 August 1784 by Mr Justice Buller, at Shrewsbury.

== Trial and appeal ==
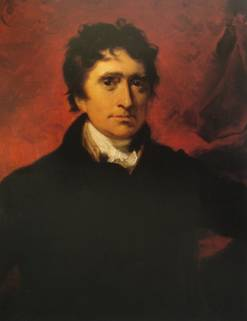
Thomas Erskine, Shipley's barrister

Edward Bearcroft, lead counsel for the prosecution, described the Dialogue as libel and argued that the truth of this was not a question for the jury to decide on; they were bound to convict the defendant as long as they decided that he had published the Dialogue, regardless of the contents. Those contents, Bearcroft went on, sought to persuade the public that "every man of age had a right to choose his own representative in Parliament". Erskine, in his reply, argued that the Dialogue was not libellous (it opened with a preface containing "a solemn protest against all sedition"), and insisted that the jury had the right to decide what constituted libel:

If they know that the subject of the paper is the topic that agitates the country around them; if they see danger in that agitation, and have reason to think that the publisher must have intended it, they say he is guilty. If, on the other hand, they consider the paper to be legal and enlightening in principle; likely to promote a spirit of activity and liberty, in times when the activity of such a spirit is essential to the public safety, and have reason to believe it to be written and published in that spirit; they say, as they ought to do, that the writer or the publisher is not guilty.

To demonstrate his feelings on the subject, Erskine asked the jury to consider him a fellow defendant, since he intended to publish the pamphlet himself as soon as possible; he then went through the Dialogue line by line, showing that not only would most people agree with it, but that it was the foundation of Pitt's Reform Bill. After Erskine concluded his arguments, again stating that the jury should feel free to debate whether the material constituted libel, Mr Justice Buller began his summing up, instructing the jury that they were only allowed to decide on whether Shipley had published the work. The jury retired, and after half an hour of discussion returned to declare Shipley "guilty of publishing only". After a long and "confounding" debate between Erskine, Buller, and the jury, Buller declared Shipley guilty on all counts.

Erskine immediately appealed the decision to the Court of King's Bench, where he argued on 8 November that Buller's statement had misdirected the jury, and that as the jury was traditionally not given the right to investigate Shipley's actual guilt, the previous trial was invalid; a jury should be permitted to determine not only whether a statement was published, but whether it was libellous. With the exception of Mr Justice Wiles, the court unanimously declared that Erskine's arguments were incorrect, and that the jury had no such role; accordingly, his appeal was denied. Shipley was, however, later freed when the King's Bench held that the initial indictment had been invalid because "there were no averments to point the application of the paper as a libel on the king and government".

Lord Mansfield, giving the main judgment in the case, expressed his concern that Erskine's argument about the law of seditious libel would lead to uncertainty. If each jury was able to define 'libel' for itself, the law could descend into anarchy. Erskine had attempted to pre-empt this objection by arguing that it was the trial judge's duty to direct the jury on the law of seditious libel. In this way, the jury could give a full verdict on the defendant's guilt, while respecting the judiciary's expertise regarding legal matters. Crosby has argued that Mansfield's argument

clearly misrepresents Erskine’s position. Far from claiming that juries should be free to depart from core rule-of-law values, his whole argument had been built upon the claim that a general verdict was the shared product of a judge and a jury. Mansfield, in his desire to avoid general theory, and in his aversion to what he considered mob justice, seems to have missed ‘what was claimed for’, relying heavily on an older model of jury equity dating to the Restoration rather than the model actually presented by Shipley’s counsel.

This debate about the true nature of the jury's verdict subsequently formed an important part of the debate on the jury's role in nineteenth-century America.

== Aftermath ==
Although the case did not directly lead to legal change, it was nevertheless widely seen as a victory; upon his release Shipley was greeted with fireworks and bonfires, and Erskine was rewarded with the Freedom of the City of Gloucester. Erskine, however, perceived it differently, and had records of the entire trial printed and sent to Charles James Fox and Lord Camden. Taking this as a hint, Fox (after much delay) introduced a Bill to Parliament in May 1791, seeking to reform the law relating to libel. After it was passed through the Commons it went to the House of Lords, where members of the judiciary attempted to delay it; in response Lord Camden, then 78, rose and bluntly stated that if the judges were to be the sole arbiters of public opinion, nothing would be able to appear that criticised the government, leading to a stifling of the freedom of the press. His appeal was successful – without it, historian H. M. Lubasz writes, the Bill would never have passed the Lords – and within three weeks Parliament had formally passed the Libel Act 1792 (32 Geo. 3. c. 60), commonly known as Fox's Libel Act, allowing juries for the first time to decide precisely what constituted libel.

== Bibliography ==
- Faught, Albert Smith (1946). "Three Freedoms in the Eighteenth Century and the Effect of Paper Shot". University of Pennsylvania Law Review. 94 (3). University of Pennsylvania: 312–321. doi:10.2307/3309804. ISSN 0041-9907. JSTOR 3309804. Archived from the original on 8 October 2014.
- Hostettler, John (2010). Thomas Erskine and Trial by Jury (2nd ed.). Waterside Press. ISBN 978-978-190-438-7.
- Lubasz, H.M. (1957). "Public Opinion Comes of Age: Reform of Libel Law in the Eighteenth Century". History Today. 8 (7). ISSN 0018-2753.`
- Page, Anthony, “The Dean of St Asaph's trial: libel and politics in the 1780s”, Journal for Eighteenth-Century Studies, 32:1 (2009), pp. 21–35
- Crosby, K. "R v Shipley (1784): The Dean of St Asaph's Case". In Philip Handler, Henry Mares and Ian Williams (Eds), 'Landmark Cases in Criminal Law' (Hart 2017).
