= Bearcroft =

Bearcroft is a surname. Notable people with the surname include:

- Edward Bearcroft (1737–1796), English barrister, judge and politician
- John Edward Bearcroft (1851–1931), British Royal Navy officer
- Philip Bearcroft (1695–1761), English clergyman and antiquary
