= William Davies Shipley =

British priest

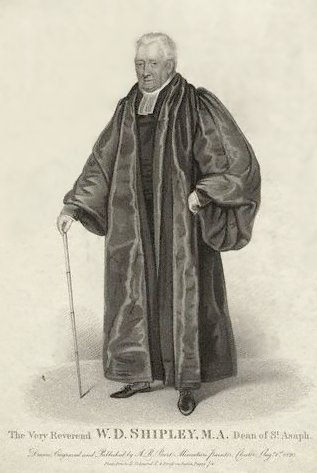

William Davies Shipley (5 October 1745 (OS) – 7 May 1826) was an Anglican priest who served as Dean of St Asaph for nearly 52 years, from 27 May 1774 until his death. In a legal cause célèbre which became known as the Case of the Dean of St Asaph, he was tried and convicted on a charge of seditious libel in August 1784, but was discharged by the Court of King's Bench a few months later without being punished.

== Early and private life ==
Shipley was born at Midgham in Berkshire, the only son of Jonathan Shipley. His father was a clergyman who served as Dean of Winchester from 1760 to 1769, as Bishop of Landaff briefly in 1769, and then as Bishop of St Asaph from 1769 to 1789. His uncle, William Shipley, was a founder of the Society for the Encouragement of Arts, Manufactures, and Commerce (which later became the Royal Society of Arts). His mother, Anna-Maria Mordaunt, was a niece of the Earl of Peterborough.

He was educated at Westminster School until 1760 and then Winchester College, and he studied at Christ Church, Oxford, where his father had been a canon. He followed his father's vocation to become a priest in the Church of England. He was quickly appointed to several lucrative church offices. His father appointed him as vicar of Ysceifiog in March 1770, and then vicar of Wrexham in 1771 and rector of Llangwn in 1772 (later exchanged for Corwen, and then Llanarmon-yn-Iâl). He became chancellor of the diocese of St Asaph in 1773, and Dean of St Asaph on 27 May 1774. He retained both of these offices until his death in 1826.

== Trial for seditious libel ==
Shipley was tried for seditious libel in 1784, after he read an anonymous pamphlet at a public meeting in January 1783. The pamphlet, The Principles of Government, in a Dialogue between a Scholar and a Peasant, advocated political reforms. Shipley arranged for a few copies, with his own amendments, to be printed in Wrexham. Shipley's political opponent, the High Sheriff of Flintshire, Thomas FitzMaurice (brother of the former Prime Minister William Petty, 2nd Earl of Shelburne) complained to the public authorities. After they declined to prosecute Shipley, FitzMaurice sought a private prosecution. Meanwhile, William Jones—Shipley's brother-in-law since he married Shipley's eldest sister Anna-Maria in April 1783—had confessed that he was the author of the pamphlet; he was not prosecuted but instead confirmed as a new judge of the Supreme Court of Judicature at Fort William in Calcutta.

Shipley was indicted at the Wrexham great sessions in April 1783 for publishing a seditious libel, and the trial was scheduled to be heard at the Denbighshire grand sessions in Wrexham that September, with judge Lloyd Kenyon presiding. The Society for Constitutional Information retained the barrister Thomas Erskine to act as Shipley's defence counsel. The trial was postponed, and finally heard by a jury at the Shrewsbury Assizes in August 1784, with Mr Justice Francis Buller presiding.

Buller followed a submission of the prosecution—which accorded with general legal practice at the time—and directed that the jury was merely to reach a finding on whether the words were in fact published and on the meaning of the words (the innuendoes) as laid; but ruled that whether the words constituted a libel or not was a question of law for the court (i.e. the judge) to decide. However, the jury gave a verdict which stated that Shipley was guilty of publishing only, not of libel. Buller intervened to ask them to deliver a verdict on whether the pamphlet was libellous, but they refused, insisting that Shipley was guilty of "publishing only". Nevertheless, Buller held that the charges were made out, and convicted Shipley.

Erskine brought an appeal to the Court of King's Bench in November 1784, arguing for a new trial on the grounds that the jury had been misdirected by Buller. The Lord Chief Justice, Lord Mansfield, turned down the request, but ruled that no part of the publication was criminal, and Shipley was discharged, to great public celebration in London and in north Wales. The case was instrumental in advancing the cause to return the decision of whether a publication is a libel to the jury, rather than being decided by the judge, finally enacted in Charles James Fox's Libel Act 1792 (32 Geo. 3. c. 60).

== Later life ==
Although Shipley was discharged, his notoriety ended his chances of emulating his father by becoming a bishop, and he remained Dean of St Asaph until his death over 40 years later. He busied himself in arranging for repairs and alterations to the structure of St Asaph Cathedral. During his term in office, the chapter house was demolished in 1779, the choir was rebuilt, and a new episcopal throne, pulpit and reredos were installed. Many of these alterations were funded by the St Asaph Cathedral Act 1814.

Shipley died at his home, Bodrhyddan Hall, near St Asaph, and was buried at Rhuddlan.

== Family life ==
Shipley married Penelope Yonge in April 1777. His wife was the daughter and co-heiress of Ellis Yonge, and her maternal great-grandfather was Sir John Conway, 2nd Baronet. The Conway family owned Rhuddlan Castle and a sugar plantation on St Kitts. The marriage made the Shipley family of the wealthiest in north Wales. They had five sons and three daughters before his wife had died in childbirth in November 1789.

His eldest son, William Shipley (1778–1820), was Whig MP for Flint Boroughs from 1807 to 1812 and for St Mawes from 1812 to 1813, but was killed in a shooting accident before his father's death. His grandson, also William, adopted the name Conway after the Dean's death.

His second and third sons, Mordaunt and Robert-John, died young.

His fourth son, Conway Shipley (1782–1808), joined the Royal Navy, and served in the battle of the Glorious First of June in 1794, later commanded the corvette HMS Hippomenes when it captured the French privateer Egyptienne, and was killed in action commanding the frigate HMS Nymphe in the blockade of the River Tagus in 1808.

His fifth son became a clergyman and was the only one to survive his father.

His eldest daughter, Penelope, married Dr Pelham Warren, a physician and later FRS; the second, Anna Maria, married Colonel Charles Dashwood; and the third, Amelia, married the Revd Reginald Heber, later Bishop of Calcutta.
