= Edward Bearcroft =

English barrister, judge and politician

Edward Bearcroft, KC (30 April 1737 – 20 November 1796) was an English barrister, judge, and politician.

== Origins and education ==
Born on 30 April 1737, he was the second son of the Reverend Philip Bearcroft DD, then Preacher later Master of the Charterhouse, and his first wife, born Elizabeth Lovegrove. Educated at Charterhouse until 1752, he then went to Peterhouse, Cambridge and in 1754 began legal studies at the Inner Temple, being called to the bar on 24 November 1758.

== Legal career ==
He built a respectable and lucrative practice as a barrister, being appointed counsel and steward of accounts to the governors of Charterhouse in 1765 and King's Counsel on 24 July 1772. In the Inner Temple he was a bencher in 1772, reader in 1780 and treasurer in 1781. He appeared in major trials, in 1778 being a defending counsel in the case of R v Baillie, where Captain Baillie was accused of criminal libel and in 1784 he was counsel for the prosecution in the case at Shrewsbury against William Davies Shipley, Dean of St Asaph, for seditious libel, now known as The Case of the Dean of St Asaph.

In 1788 he was appointed Chief Justice of Chester, holding the post despite increasing deafness until his death. In October 1794 he was among the counsel for the Crown in the 1794 Treason Trials.

== Political career ==
He unsuccessfully contested Worcester in the general election of 1774, but was returned as Member of Parliament for Hindon in 1784. His parliamentary patron, William Thomas Beckford, then offered him the seat of Saltash, where he was returned in 1790, holding it until his death.

In Parliament, he support the administration of William Pitt when he was not away sitting on the Chester circuit. He spoke against John Horne Tooke's Westminster election petition on 9 December 1790, was listed hostile to the repeal of the Test Act in Scotland in April 1791, attempted to define the function of juries in libel cases on 31 May 1791, opposed the Farnham Hop bill as an attack on private property on 7 June 1793, and on 3 March 1794 defended the petition of Christopher Atkinson Saville.

On 28 July 1795 he wrote to Pitt asking that his second son Philip be appointed Deputy Commissary of Accounts on the staff of the British forces in Santo Domingo, now Haiti; this request was granted. He was re-elected in 1796 but died on 20 November 1796 at Northampton.

== Family ==
On 31 October 1758, he married Sarah Maria Molesworth, born 27 October 1737, the daughter of the Honourable Hamilton Walter Molesworth and his wife Sarah Maria Skrine. She died on 28 August 1759, leaving one son, Edward. He next married Elizabeth Rogers, born 1733, the daughter and coheiress of Edward Rogers who lived at Newent and his wife Elizabeth. She died on 13 October 1774 leaving one daughter, Elizabeth, and one son, Philip. On 21 December 1778 he married Clare St George Wilson, born 1748, the daughter of Edmond Wilson who lived at Mortlake, and they had two sons and three daughters. She survived him and on 30 January 1797 wrote to Pitt to say that her husband's money had gone to his eldest son and his lands to his second son, leaving her penniless with five children. On 9 March 1800 she was awarded a modest government pension of 200 pounds a year, worth about 18,000 pounds a year in 2015.

Parliament of Great Britain
Preceded by Lloyd Kenyon; Nathaniel William Wraxall	Member of Parliament for Hindon; 1784–1790; With: William Egerton	Succeeded by William Thomas Beckford; James Adams
Preceded by Charles Ambler; John Lemon	Member of Parliament for Saltash; 1790–1796; With: Viscount Garlies 1790–1795; William Stewart 1795–1796; The Lord Macdonald 1796	Succeeded by The Lord Macdonald; Charles Smith
Legal offices
Preceded by Richard Pepper Arden	Chief Justice of Chester; 1788–1796	Succeeded by James Adair
