= Philip Bearcroft =

English clergyman and antiquary

- Born: 21 February 1695; Worcester, Worcestershire, England
- Died: 17 October 1761 (aged 66); London, England
- Occupation: Clergyman

Philip Bearcroft, D.D. (21 February 1695 – 17 October 1761) was an English clergyman and antiquary.

== Origins and education ==
Bearcroft was born in the city of Worcester on 21 February 1695 (though some sources wrongly say 1 May 1697), the eldest child of Philip Bearcroft and his wife Elizabeth Ford. The Bearcrofts of Worcester were a branch of an old-established family of landed gentry whose estate was at Mere Hall in the parish of Hanbury. He was educated at Charterhouse School, of which he was elected a scholar on the nomination of Lord Somers in July 1710. On 17 December 1712, he matriculated at Magdalen Hall, Oxford, gaining his B.A. Degree in 1716. In 1717 he became a probationary and in 1719 an actual fellow of Merton College, the year he took his M.A. degree. He added the degrees of B.D. and D.D. in 1730.

== Career ==
Bearcroft was ordained deacon in 1718 at Bristol and priest in 1719 at Gloucester. He was appointed Preacher to the Charterhouse in 1724; vicar of Elham, Kent in 1731; an Honorary Chaplain to the King in 1738; Secretary to the Society for Propagation of the Gospel in Foreign Parts in 1739; rector of Stourmouth, Kent, in 1743; and Master of Charterhouse on 18 December 1753. In 1755, he was collated to a prebendal stall in Wells Cathedral.

== Personal life ==
On 4 March 1730 Bearcroft married Elizabeth Lovegrove, widow of a man called Roberts, and they had three sons: Philip born 1731, Edward born 1737, who became a prominent lawyer and MP, and William born 1740. After Elizabeth's death, on 18 October 1753 he married Mary Coventry, widow of Henry Barker and daughter of Thomas Coventry, the brother of William Coventry, 5th Earl of Coventry.

Bearcroft died on 17 October 1761. He was survived by his widow.

== Literary works ==
In 1737 he published An Historical Account of Thomas Sutton, Esquire, and of his foundation in Charter-house, which supplied the bulk of the material for Robert Smythe's history in 1808. He also intended to publish a collection of the rules and orders of the Charterhouse, but was prevented by the governors, some extracts only being printed in a quarto pamphlet and distributed among the officers of the house. In Nichols's Bowyer, Bearcroft is spoken of as "a worthy man, but with no great talents for writing". Some of his sermons were published, both before and after his death, and thirteen discourses on moral and religious subjects were published in Relics of the Sacred Ministry in 1835.

== Sources ==
Attribution

- This article incorporates text from a publication now in the public domain: Goodwin, Alfred (1885). "Bearcroft, Philip". In Stephen, Leslie (ed.). Dictionary of National Biography. Vol. 4. London: Smith, Elder & Co. pp. 12–13.; Endnotes:
- Gentleman's Magazine xxxi. 538
- Nichols's Literary Anecdotes i. 650
- Le Neve's Fasti Ecclesiae Anglicanæ, ii. 202. In the Rawlinson manuscripts folio 16152 (Bodleian Libr.), where a brief account appears, the date of birth is correctly given as 21 February 1695.
