= Libel Act 1792 =

Act of the Parliament of Great Britain

Libel Act 1792 (Note: The citation of this act by this short title was authorised by section 1 of, and the first schedule to, the Short Titles Act 1896. Due to the repeal of those provisions it is now authorised by section 19(2) of the Interpretation Act 1978.)
- Act of Parliament
- Parliament of Great Britain
- Long title: An Act to remove Doubts respecting the Functions of Juries in Cases of Libel.
- Citation: 32 Geo. 3. c. 60
- Territorial extent: Great Britain

Dates
- Royal assent: 15 June 1792
- Commencement: 31 January 1792 (Note: Start of session.)
- Repealed: England and Wales: 12 January 2010; Scotland: 28 March 2011 (Note: The Criminal Justice and Licensing (Scotland) Act 2010 (Commencement No. 8, Transitional and Savings Provisions) Order 2011.)
Other legislation
Repealed by	England and Wales: Coroners and Justice Act 2009; Scotland: Criminal Justice and Licensing (Scotland) Act 2010

Status: Repealed

Text of statute as originally enacted

Revised text of statute as amended

The Libel Act 1792 (32 Geo. 3. c. 60), also known as Fox's Act, was an act of the Parliament of Great Britain. At the urging of the Whig politician Charles James Fox, the Act restored to juries the right to decide what was libel and whether a defendant was guilty, rather than leaving it solely to the judge.

The act itself only applied to criminal trials, but the rules it created have come to be applied in civil trials.

Edmund Burke presented a similar bill in 1771. Charles James Fox opposed it and it was not passed.

== Subsequent developments ==
The whole act was repealed by the part 2 of schedule 23 of the Coroners and Justice Act 2009, with effect from 12 January 2010; this abolished the criminal libel laws.

The whole act was repealed for Scotland by section 203 of, and paragraph 1 of schedule 7 to, the Criminal Justice and Licensing (Scotland) Act 2010, with effect from 28 March 2011.
