= List of acts of the Parliament of Great Britain from 1792 =

This is a complete list of acts of the Parliament of Great Britain for the year 1792.

For acts passed until 1707, see the list of acts of the Parliament of England and the list of acts of the Parliament of Scotland. See also the list of acts of the Parliament of Ireland.

For acts passed from 1801 onwards, see the list of acts of the Parliament of the United Kingdom. For acts of the devolved parliaments and assemblies in the United Kingdom, see the list of acts of the Scottish Parliament, the list of acts of the Northern Ireland Assembly, and the list of acts and measures of Senedd Cymru; see also the list of acts of the Parliament of Northern Ireland.

The number shown after each act's title is its chapter number. Acts are cited using this number, preceded by the year(s) of the reign during which the relevant parliamentary session was held; thus the Union with Ireland Act 1800 is cited as "39 & 40 Geo. 3. c. 67", meaning the 67th act passed during the session that started in the 39th year of the reign of George III and which finished in the 40th year of that reign. Note that the modern convention is to use Arabic numerals in citations (thus "41 Geo. 3" rather than "41 Geo. III"). Acts of the last session of the Parliament of Great Britain and the first session of the Parliament of the United Kingdom are both cited as "41 Geo. 3".

Acts passed by the Parliament of Great Britain did not have a short title; however, some of these acts have subsequently been given a short title by acts of the Parliament of the United Kingdom (such as the Short Titles Act 1896).

Before the Acts of Parliament (Commencement) Act 1793 came into force on 8 April 1793, acts passed by the Parliament of Great Britain were deemed to have come into effect on the first day of the session in which they were passed. Because of this, the years given in the list below may in fact be the year before a particular act was passed.

== 32 Geo. 3 ==
The second session of the 17th Parliament of Great Britain, which met from 31 January 1792 until 15 June 1792.

This session was also traditionally cited as 32 G. 3.

=== Public acts ===
Short title	Citation	Royal assent
Long title
Controverted Elections, etc. Act 1792 (repealed)	32 Geo. 3. c. 1	15 February 1792
An Act to extend the Provisions of certain Acts of Parliament, made to regulate the Trials of controverted Elections, or Returns of Members to serve in Parliament. (Repealed by Controverted Elections Act 1828 (9 Geo. 4. c. 22))
Inhabited House Duties Act 1792 (repealed)	32 Geo. 3. c. 2	9 March 1792
An Act to repeal the Duties on certain inhabited Houses, containing less than Seven Windows or Lights, granted by an Act of the Sixth Year of the Reign of His present Majesty. (Note: House and Window Duties Act 1766 (6 Geo. 3. c. 38)) (Repealed by House Tax Act 1803 (43 Geo. 3. c. 161))
Duties on Servants Act 1792 (repealed)	32 Geo. 3. c. 3	9 March 1792
An Act for repealing the Duties on Female Servants. (Repealed by Statute Law Revision Act 1871 (34 & 35 Vict. c. 116))
Duties on Wagons, etc. Act 1792 (repealed)	32 Geo. 3. c. 4	9 March 1792
An Act for repealing the Duties on Waggons, Wains, Carts, and other Carriages, granted by an Act of the Twenty-third Year of the Reign of His present Majesty. (Note: Duties on Waggons, etc. Act 1783 (23 Geo. 3. c. 66)) (Repealed by Statute Law Revision Act 1871 (34 & 35 Vict. c. 116))
Land Tax Act 1792 (repealed)	32 Geo. 3. c. 5	9 March 1792
An Act for granting an Aid to His Majesty by a Land Tax to be raised in Great Britain, for the Service of the Year One thousand seven hundred and ninety-two. (Repealed by Statute Law Revision Act 1871 (34 & 35 Vict. c. 116))
Malt Duties Act 1792 (repealed)	32 Geo. 3. c. 6	9 March 1792
An Act for continuing and granting to His Majesty certain Duties upon Malt, Mum, Cyder, and Perry, for the Service of the Year One thousand seven hundred and ninety-two. (Repealed by Statute Law Revision Act 1871 (34 & 35 Vict. c. 116))
Duties on Candles Act 1792 (repealed)	32 Geo. 3. c. 7	10 March 1792
An Act for repealing a certain Part of the Duty upon all Candles (except Wax and Spermaceti Candles). (Repealed by Statute Law Revision Act 1871 (34 & 35 Vict. c. 116))
Frauds in Excise Revenue Act 1792 (repealed)	32 Geo. 3. c. 8	5 April 1792
An Act for the more effectual preventing of Frauds in the Revenue of Excise by Common Brewers. (Repealed by Statute Law Revision Act 1871 (34 & 35 Vict. c. 116))
Exportation Act 1792 (repealed)	32 Geo. 3. c. 9	5 April 1792
An Act for repealing certain Regulations with respect to Certificates on exporting Tea to Ireland or America. (Repealed by Statute Law Revision Act 1861 (24 & 25 Vict. c. 101))
Offences Against Excise Laws Act 1792 (repealed)	32 Geo. 3. c. 10	5 April 1792
An Act for the better Execution of certain Warrants issued for the apprehending and committing Persons convicted of Offences against the Excise Laws. (Repealed by Statute Law Revision Act 1861 (24 & 25 Vict. c. 101))
Sales by Auction Act 1792 (repealed)	32 Geo. 3. c. 11	5 April 1792
An Act to compel Auctioneers to declare whether Sales have been held under the Notices now required to be given by Law. (Repealed by Statute Law Revision Act 1861 (24 & 25 Vict. c. 101))
Reduction of National Debt Act 1792 (repealed)	32 Geo. 3. c. 12	5 April 1792
An Act for granting to His Majesty the Sum of Four hundred thousand Pounds, to be issued and paid to the Governor and Company of the Bank of England, to be by them placed to the Account of the Commissioners for the Reduction of the National Debt. (Repealed by Statute Law Revision Act 1861 (24 & 25 Vict. c. 101))
Annuities to Duke, etc., of York Act 1792 (repealed)	32 Geo. 3. c. 13	5 April 1792
An Act to enable His Majesty to make Provision for the Establishment of Their Royal Highnesses the Duke and Duchess of York and Albany; and also to settle an Annuity on Her Royal Highness during the Time of Her Natural Life, to commence from the Decease of His said Royal Highness, in case Her said Royal Highness shall servive him. (Repealed by Statute Law Revision Act 1871 (34 & 35 Vict. c. 116))
Trade with America Act 1792 (repealed)	32 Geo. 3. c. 14	30 March 1792
An Act to continue the Laws now in Force, for regulating the Trade between the Subjects of His Majesty's Dominions, and the Inhabitants of the Territories belonging to the United States of America, so far as the same relate to the Trade and Commerce carried on between this Kingdom and the Inhabitants of the Countries belonging to the said United States. (Repealed by Statute Law Revision Act 1871 (34 & 35 Vict. c. 116))
Loans of Exchequer Bills Act 1792 (repealed)	32 Geo. 3. c. 15	30 March 1792
An Act for raising a certain Sum of Money by Loans or Exchequer Bills, for the Service of the Year One thousand seven hundred and ninety-two. (Repealed by Statute Law Revision Act 1871 (34 & 35 Vict. c. 116))
Loans of Exchequer Bills (No. 2) Act 1792 (repealed)	32 Geo. 3. c. 16	30 March 1792
An Act for raising a further Sum of Money by Loans or Exchequer Bills, for the Service of the Year One thousand seven hundred and ninety-two. (Repealed by Statute Law Revision Act 1871 (34 & 35 Vict. c. 116))
Marine Mutiny Act 1792 (repealed)	32 Geo. 3. c. 17	9 March 1792
An Act for the Regulation of His Majesty's Marine Forces while on Shore. (Repealed by Statute Law Revision Act 1871 (34 & 35 Vict. c. 116))
Malt Duties (No. 2) Act 1792 (repealed)	32 Geo. 3. c. 18	10 March 1792
An Act for repealing the Duties upon Malt, granted by an Act made in the Thirty-first Year of the Reign of His present Majesty, intituled, "An Act for granting to His Majesty additional Duties upon Malt." (Note: Malt Duties Act 1791 (31 Geo. 3. c. 2)) (Repealed by Statute Law Revision Act 1871 (34 & 35 Vict. c. 116))
Mutiny Act 1792 (repealed)	32 Geo. 3. c. 19	10 March 1792
An Act for punishing Mutiny and Desertion; and for the better Payment of the Army and their Quarters. (Repealed by Statute Law Revision Act 1871 (34 & 35 Vict. c. 116))
Stone Poor Relief Act 1792 (repealed)	32 Geo. 3. c. 20	30 March 1792
An Act for providing a Workhouse for the Reception of the Poor of the Parish of Stone, in the County of Stafford; and for regulating and employing the Poor therein. (Repealed by Statute Law (Repeals) Act 2013 (c. 2))
Frauds in Excise Revenue (No. 2) Act 1792 (repealed)	32 Geo. 3. c. 21	30 April 1792
An Act for the more effectual Prevention of Frauds in the Revenue of Excise, with respect to the Manufacturing of Soap. (Repealed by Duties on Soap Act 1840 (3 & 4 Vict. c. 49))
Fishery Act 1792 (repealed)	32 Geo. 3. c. 22	30 April 1792
An Act to continue and amend several Laws relating to the Encouragement of the Fisheries carried on in the Greenland Seas and Davis's Streights, and to amend the Laws now in Force, for the Encouragement of the Fisheries carried on in the Seas to the Southward of the Greenland Seas and Davis's Streights. (Repealed by Statute Law Revision Act 1861 (24 & 25 Vict. c. 101))
Land Tax (Commissioners) Act 1792 (repealed)	32 Geo. 3. c. 23	30 April 1792
An Act for rectifying Mistakes in the Names of several of the Commissioners appointed by an Act made in the last Session of Parliament, to put in Execution an Act made in the same Session, intituled, "An Act for granting an Aid to His Majesty by a Land Tax, to be raised in Great Britain, for the Service of the Year One thousand seven hundred and ninety-one;" (Note: Land Tax Act 1791 (31 Geo. 3. c. 6)) and for appointing other Commissioners together with those named in the first mentioned Act, to put in Execution an Act of this Session of Parliament, (Note: Land Tax Act 1792 (32 Geo. 3. c. 5)) for granting an Aid to His Majesty by a Land Tax, to be raised in Great Britain, for the Service of the Year One thousand seven hundred and ninety-two; and for indemnifying such Persons as have acted as Commissioners for executing the said Act, for granting an Aid to His Majesty by a Land Tax to be raised in Great Britain, for the Service of the Year One thousand seven hundred and ninety-one. (Repealed by Statute Law Revision Act 1871 (34 & 35 Vict. c. 116))
Crown Lands in Privy Garden, Westminster Act 1792 (repealed)	32 Geo. 3. c. 24	30 April 1792
An Act to repeal so much of an Act made in the Twenty-seventh Year of His present Majesty, (Note: Sale of Certain Houses, etc., Belonging to His Majesty Act 1787 (27 Geo. 3. c. 22)) as relates to the Sale of the House in Privy Garden, (Note: Privy Garden of the Palace of Whitehall.) heretofore used as an Office for the Commissioners of the Lottery, and to enable His Majesty to grant the said Premises. (Repealed by Statute Law (Repeals) Act 1978 (c. 45))
Bank of Scotland Act 1792 (repealed)	32 Geo. 3. c. 25	30 April 1792
An Act to enable the Governor and Company of the Bank of Scotland, further to increase the Capital Stock of the said Company. (Repealed by Statute Law (Repeals) Act 1981 (c. 19))
Militia Pay Act 1792 (repealed)	32 Geo. 3. c. 26	30 April 1792
An Act for defraying the Charge of the Pay and Cloathing of the Militia, in that Part of Great Britain called England, for One Year, beginning the Twenty-fifth Day of March One thousand seven hundred and ninety-two. (Repealed by Statute Law Revision Act 1871 (34 & 35 Vict. c. 116))
Indemnity Act 1792 (repealed)	32 Geo. 3. c. 27	30 April 1792
An Act to indemnify such Persons as have omitted to Qualify themselves for Offices and Employments; and to indemnify Justices of the Peace, or others who have omitted to register or deliver in their Qualifications within the Time limited by Law; and for giving further Time for those Purposes, and to indemnify Members and Officers in Cities, Corporations, and Borough Towns, whose Admissions have been omitted to be stamped according to Law, or having been stamped, have been lost or mislaid; and for allowing them Time to provide Admissions duly stamped; to give further Time to such Persons as have omitted to make and file Affidavits of the Execution of Indentures of Clerks to Attornies and Solicitors; for indemnifying Deputy Lieutenants and Officers of the Militia, who have neglected to transmit Descriptions of their Qualifications to the Clerks of the Peace within the Time limited by Law; and for giving further Time for that Purpose; and for allowing further Time to such Persons as have omitted to pay the Duties on the Indentures and Contracts of Clerks, Apprentices, or Servants. (Repealed by Promissory Oaths Act 1871 (34 & 35 Vict. c. 48))
Lottery Act 1792 (repealed)	32 Geo. 3. c. 28	30 April 1792
An Act for granting to His Majesty a certain Sum of Money to be raised by a Lottery. (Repealed by Statute Law Revision Act 1871 (34 & 35 Vict. c. 116))
Wear Coal Trade Act 1792 (repealed)	32 Geo. 3. c. 29	30 April 1792
An Act for establishing a permanent Fund for the Relief and Support of Skippers and Keelmen, employed in the Coal Trade on the River Wear, in the County of Durham, who by Sickness or other accidental Misfortunes, or by old Age, shall not be able to maintain themselves and their Families, and also for the Relief of the Widows and Children of such Skippers and Keelmen. (Repealed by Statute Law (Repeals) Act 1981 (c. 19))
Bridgnorth Church Act 1792	32 Geo. 3. c. 30	30 March 1792
An Act for taking down the Church, Chancel and Tower, belonging to the Parish of Saint Mary Magdalen in Bridgnorth, in the County of Salop; and for rebuilding the same, and for enlarging the Burial Ground of the said Parish.
Canvey Island, Sea Defences Act 1792 (repealed)	32 Geo. 3. c. 31	30 April 1792
An Act for more effectually embanking, draining, and otherwise improving the Island of Canvey, in the County of Essex. (Repealed by Essex River and South Essex Water Act 1969 (c. xlix))
Customs Act 1792 (repealed)	32 Geo. 3. c. 32	8 May 1792
An Act to revive and continue so much of an Act made in the Sixth Year of the Reign of His present Majesty, (Note: Customs Act 1766 (6 Geo. 3. c. 50)) as relates to the Conveyance of Sheep between Cowes, in the Isle of Wight, and the Ports of Southampton and Portsmouth, and to extend the same to Horses and Lambs; and to amend the said Act. (Repealed by Customs Law Repeal Act 1825 (6 Geo. 4. c. 105))
Navy Act 1792 (repealed)	32 Geo. 3. c. 33	8 May 1792
An Act for explaining and amending an Act passed in the Thirty-first Year of the Reign of His late Majesty King George the Second, intituled, "An Act for the Encouragement of Seamen employed in the Royal Navy, and for establishing a regular Method for the punctual, frequent, and certain Payment of their Wages, and for enabling them more easily and readily to remit the same for the Support of their Wives and Families, and for preventing Frauds and Abuses attending such Payments;" (Note: Navy Act 1757 (31 Geo. 2. c. 10)) and for further extending the Benefits thereof to Petty Officers and Seamen, Non-commissioned Officers of Marines, and Marines serving, or who may have served, on Board any of His Majesty's Ships. (Repealed by Pay of the Navy Act 1830 (11 Geo. 4 & 1 Will. 4. c. 20))
Navy (No. 2) Act 1792 (repealed)	32 Geo. 3. c. 34	8 May 1792
An Act for explaining and amending an Act passed in the Twenty-sixth Year of the Reign of His present Majesty, intituled, "An Act for the further preventing Frauds and Abuses attending the Payment of Wages, Prize Money, and other Allowances due for the Service of Petty Officers and Seamen on Board any of His Majesty's Ships;" (Note: Navy Act 1786 (26 Geo. 3. c. 63)) and for further extending the Benefits thereof to Petty Officers and Seamen, Non-commissioned Officers of Marines, and Marines serving, or who may have served, on Board any of His Majesty's Ships. (Repealed by Wills, etc., of Seamen, etc. Act 1815 (55 Geo. 3. c. 60))
Appropriation Act 1792 (repealed)	32 Geo. 3. c. 35	8 May 1792
An Act for granting to His Majesty a certain Sum of Money out of the consolidated Fund; and for applying certain Monies therein mentioned for the Service of the Year One thousand seven hundred and ninety-two; for further appropriating the Supplies granted in this Session of Parliament, and for making forth Duplicates of Exchequer Bills, Lottery Tickets, Certificates, Receipts, Annuity Orders, or other Orders lost, burnt, or otherwise destroyed. (Repealed by Statute Law Revision Act 1871 (34 & 35 Vict. c. 116))
Continuance of Laws Act 1792 (repealed)	32 Geo. 3. c. 36	8 May 1792
An Act to continue several Laws therein mentioned, relating to the discontinuing the Duties payable upon the Importation of Tallow, Hog's Lard, and Grease; to the free Importation of certain Raw Hides and Skins from Ireland and the British Plantations in America; to the prohibiting the Exportation of Tools and Utensils made use of in the Iron and Steel Manufactures of this Kingdom, and to prevent the seducing of Artificers and Workmen employed in those Manufactures to go into Parts beyond the Seas; to the better regulating of Pilots for the conducting of Ships and Vessels from Dover, Deal, and the Isle of Thanet; to the ascertaining the Strength of Spirits by Clarke's Hydrometer; and to the allowing the Importation of Seal Skins cured with foreign Salt, free of Duty. (Repealed by Statute Law Revision Act 1871 (34 & 35 Vict. c. 116))
Importation and Exportation Act 1792 (repealed)	32 Geo. 3. c. 37	8 May 1792
An Act for making perpetual an Act made in the Twenty-seventh Year of the Reign of His present Majesty, intituled, "An Act for allowing the Importation and Exportation of certain Goods, Wares, and Merchandize, in the Ports of Kingston, (Note: Kingston, Jamaica.) Savannah-la-Mar, (Note: Savanna-la-Mar, Jamaica.) Montego Bay, (Note: Montego Bay, Jamaica.) and Santa Lucea, (Note: Lucea, Jamaica.) in the Island of Jamaica, in the Port of Saint George (Note: St. George's, Grenada.) in the Island of Grenada, in the Port of Roseau (Note: Roseau, Dominica.) in the Island of Dominica, and in the Port of Nassau (Note: Nassau, The Bahamas.) in the Island of New Providence, one of the Bahama Islands, under certain Regulations and Restrictions." (Note: Importation and Exportation Act 1787 (27 Geo. 3. c. 27)) (Repealed by Statute Law Revision Act 1861 (24 & 25 Vict. c. 101))
Montrose Bridge Act 1792 (repealed)	32 Geo. 3. c. 38	30 April 1792
An Act for building a Bridge over the River South Esk, at or near the Town of Montrose, in the County of Forfar, and for making suitable Approaches thereto. (Repealed by Statute Law (Repeals) Act 1977 (c. 18))
Saint Botolph Church Aldersgate Act 1792 (repealed)	32 Geo. 3. c. 39	8 May 1792
An Act to enable the Inhabitants of the Parish of Saint Botolph-without-Aldersgate, in the City of London, to raise Money for paying and discharging the Debts that have been contracted in repairing their Parish Church and building a new Workhouse. (Repealed by Statute Law (Repeals) Act 2013 (c. 2))
Excise Laws, Glass Act 1792 (repealed)	32 Geo. 3. c. 40	11 June 1792
An Act for amending the Laws of Excise, relating to the Manufactory of Flint Glass. (Repealed by Glass Duties Act 1838 (1 & 2 Vict. c. 44))
Auction Duty Act 1792 (repealed)	32 Geo. 3. c. 41	11 June 1792
An Act to exempt Whale Oil and other Articles therein mentioned and sold by Auction in Great Britain, from the Duty imposed on such Sales. (Repealed by Statute Law Revision Act 1861 (24 & 25 Vict. c. 101))
Offices of Court of Chancery Act 1792 (repealed)	32 Geo. 3. c. 42	11 June 1792
An Act to empower the High Court of Chancery to lay out a further Sum of the Suitors Money upon proper Securities, and for applying the Interest towards discharging the Expences of the Office of the Accountant General, and for building Offices for the Masters in Ordinary in Chancery, and a Public Office for the Suitors of the said Court, and Offices for the Secretaries of Bankrupts and Lunaticks, and for building Repositories for securing the Title Deeds of the Suitors of the said Court, and the Records and Proceedings of the Commissioners of Bankrupts and Lunaticks. (Repealed by Court of Chancery (Funds) Act 1872 (35 & 36 Vict. c. 44))
Customs (No. 2) Act 1792 (repealed)	32 Geo. 3. c. 43	11 June 1792
An Act for regulating the Allowance of the Drawback and Payment of the Bounty on the Exportation of Sugar, and for permitting the Importation of Sugar and Coffee into the Bahama and Bermuda Islands in foreign Ships. (Repealed by Customs Law Repeal Act 1825 (6 Geo. 4. c. 105))
Silk Manufacture Act 1792 (repealed)	32 Geo. 3. c. 44	11 June 1792
An Act for extending the Provisions of an Act made in the Thirteenth Year of the Reign of His present Majesty, intituled, "An Act to empower the Magistrates therein mentioned to settle and regulate the Wages of Persons employed in the Silk Manufacture within their respective Jurisdictions," (Note: Silk Manufactures Act 1772 (13 Geo. 3. c. 68)) To Manufactories of Silk mixed with other Materials, and for the more effectual Punishment of Buyers and Receivers of Silk purloined and embezzled by Persons employed in the Manufacture thereof. (Repealed by Silk Manufactures Act 1824 (5 Geo. 4. c. 66))
Rogues and Vagabonds Act 1792 (repealed)	32 Geo. 3. c. 45	11 June 1792
An Act to explain and amend an Act made in the Seventeenth Year of the Reign of His late Majesty King George the Second, intituled, "An Act to amend and make more effectual the Laws relating to Rogues, Vagabonds, and other idle and disorderly Persons, and to Houses of Correction." (Note: Justices Commitment Act 1743 (17 Geo. 2. c. 5)) (Repealed by Statute Law Revision Act 1861 (24 & 25 Vict. c. 101))
Newfoundland Courts Act 1792	32 Geo. 3. c. 46	15 June 1792
An Act for establishing Courts of Judicature in the Island of Newfoundland, and the Islands adjacent.
Hackney Coaches Act 1792 (repealed)	32 Geo. 3. c. 47	11 June 1792
An Act to explain and amend so much of an Act made in the Seventh Year of the Reign of His present Majesty, (Note: Highways (No. 2) Act 1766 (7 Geo. 3. c. 42)) as relates to Hackney Coaches and Chairs. (Repealed by London Hackney Carriage Act 1831 (1 & 2 Will. 4. c. 22))
Middlesex Sessions Act 1792 (repealed)	32 Geo. 3. c. 48	11 June 1792
An Act to empower the Justices of the Peace for the County of Middlesex to continue a Session of the Peace and of Oyer and Terminer, begun to be holden before the Essoign Day of Term, and Sitting of the King's Bench at Westminster, notwithstanding the happening of such Essoign Day, or the Sitting of the said Court of Kings Bench at Westminster, or elsewhere, in the said County of Middlesex. (Repealed by Statute Law Revision Act 1861 (24 & 25 Vict. c. 101))
Importation Act 1792 (repealed)	32 Geo. 3. c. 49	11 June 1792
An Act for allowing the Importation of Quercitron or Black Oak Bark, when the Price of Oak Bark shall be under the Price mentioned in an Act of the Twelfth Year of His present Majesty; (Note: Customs (No. 1) Act 1772 (12 Geo. 3. c. 50)) and for lowering the Duty payable on Red Mangrove Bark imported into this Kingdom. (Repealed by Statute Law Revision Act 1861 (24 & 25 Vict. c. 101) (Note: Incorrectly cited as "SLR 1871" in the Chronological Table of the Statutes.))
Coast Trade Act 1792 (repealed)	32 Geo. 3. c. 50	11 June 1792
An Act for the Relief of the Coast Trade of Great Britain; for exempting certain Coast Documents from Stamp Duties; for abolishing the Bond usually called The Isle of Man Bond; and for permitting Corn and Grain, brought Coastwise, to be transhipped into Lighters, for the Purpose of being carried through the Canal from the Forth to the Clyde. (Repealed by Customs Law Repeal Act 1825 (6 Geo. 4. c. 105))
Stamp Duty Act 1792 (repealed)	32 Geo. 3. c. 51	15 June 1792
An Act to exempt certain Letters passing between Merchants or other Persons carrying on Trade or Commerce in this Kingdom, containing Agreements with respect to Merchandize, Notes or Bills of Exchange, from the Stamp Duty now imposed on written Agreements. (Repealed by Statute Law Revision Act 1861 (24 & 25 Vict. c. 101))
Slave Trade Act 1792 (repealed)	32 Geo. 3. c. 52	11 June 1792
An Act to continue, for a limited Time, several Acts of Parliament for regulating the shipping and carrying Slaves in British Vessels from the Coast of Africa. (Repealed by Statute Law Revision Act 1871 (34 & 35 Vict. c. 116))
Middlesex Justices Act 1792 (repealed)	32 Geo. 3. c. 53	15 June 1792
An Act for the more effectual Administration of the Office of a Justice of the Peace, in such Parts of the Counties of Middlesex and Surrey, as lie in and near the Metropolis, and for the more effectual Prevention of Felonies. (Repealed by Metropolitan Police Magistrates Act 1802 (42 Geo. 3. c. 76))
Customs (No. 3) Act 1792 (repealed)	32 Geo. 3. c. 54	11 June 1792
An Act for more effectually securing the Duties upon foreign printed, painted, or stained Paper, imported into Great Britain. (Repealed by Statute Law Revision Act 1861 (24 & 25 Vict. c. 101))
Reduction of National Debt Act 1792 (repealed)	32 Geo. 3. c. 55	15 June 1792
An Act to render more effectual an Act, made in the Twenty-sixth Year of His present Majesty's Reign, intituled, "An Act for vesting certain Sums in Commissioners at the End of every Quarter of a Year, to be by them applied to the Reduction of the National Debt;" (Note: National Debt Reduction Act 1786 (26 Geo. 3. c. 31)) and to direct the Application of an additional Sum to the Reduction of the said Debt, in Case of future Loans. (Repealed by Statute Law Revision Act 1861 (24 & 25 Vict. c. 101))
Servants' Characters Act 1792 (repealed)	32 Geo. 3. c. 56	15 June 1792
An Act for preventing the counterfeiting of Certificates of the Characters of Servants. (Repealed for Scotland by Statute Law (Repeals) Act 1993 (c. 50) and for England and Wales by Statute Law (Repeals) Act 2008 (c. 12))
Parish Apprentices Act 1792 (repealed)	32 Geo. 3. c. 57	11 June 1792
An Act for the further Regulation of Parish Apprentices. (Repealed by Poor Law Act 1927 (17 & 18 Geo. 5. c. 14))
Information in Nature of Quo Warranto Act 1792 (repealed)	32 Geo. 3. c. 58	11 June 1792
An Act for the Amendment of the Law in Proceedings upon Information in Nature of Quo Warranto. (Repealed by Statute Law Revision Act 1887 (50 & 51 Vict. c. 59))
Licensing of Alehouses Act 1792 (repealed)	32 Geo. 3. c. 59	11 June 1792
An Act to amend so much of two Acts made in the Twenty-sixth (Note: Alehouses Act 1753 (26 Geo. 2. c. 31)) and Twenty-ninth (Note: Alehouses Act 1756 (29 Geo. 2. c. 12)) Years of the Reign of His late Majesty King George the Second, as relates to the licensing of Alehouse Keepers and Victuallers; and for better regulating Alehouses, and the Manner of granting such Licences in future; and also of granting Licences to Persons selling Wines to be drank in their Houses. (Repealed by Alehouse Act 1828 (9 Geo. 4. c. 61))
Libel Act 1792 or Fox's Act (repealed)	32 Geo. 3. c. 60	15 June 1792
An Act to remove Doubts respecting the Functions of Juries in Cases of Libel. (Repealed by Coroners and Justice Act 2009 (c. 25) and Criminal Justice and Licensing (Scotland) Act 2010 (asp 13))
Indemnity to Proprietors, etc., of Newspapers Act 1792 (repealed)	32 Geo. 3. c. 61	11 June 1792
An Act to indemnify Persons being Proprietors, Printers, and Editors of Newspapers and other Publications, from certain Penalties incurred under several Acts therein mentioned, relative to Lotteries. (Repealed by Statute Law Revision Act 1871 (34 & 35 Vict. c. 116))
Coaches, Bond Street Act 1792 (repealed)	32 Geo. 3. c. 62	11 June 1792
An Act for removing the Stand of Hackney Coaches out of New Bond Street and Old Bond Street, in the Parish of Saint George Hanover Square, in the Liberty of Westminster. (Repealed by Statute Law Revision Act 1948 (11 & 12 Geo. 6. c. 62))
Scottish Episcopalians Relief Act 1792 (repealed)	32 Geo. 3. c. 63	15 June 1792
An Act for granting Relief to Pastors, Ministers, and Lay Persons of the Episcopal Communion in Scotland. (Repealed by Statute Law (Repeals) Act 1977 (c. 18))
Saint Bride Church Act 1792 (repealed)	32 Geo. 3. c. 64	8 May 1792
An Act for repairing, altering, and improving the Parish Church of Saint Bridget, otherwise Saint Bride, in the City of London; and for providing a Workhouse for the same Parish. (Repealed by Statute Law (Repeals) Act 2013 (c. 2))
Levant Trade Act 1792 (repealed)	32 Geo. 3. c. 65	11 June 1792
An Act to extend and render more effectual an Act passed in the Twenty-sixth Year of the Reign of His late Majesty King George the Second, intituled, "An Act for enlarging and regulating the Trade into the Levant Seas." (Note: Levant Trade Act 1753 (26 Geo. 2. c. 18)) (Repealed by Statute Law Revision Act 1861 (24 & 25 Vict. c. 101))
Saint Pancras Church Act 1792 (repealed)	32 Geo. 3. c. 66	8 May 1792
An Act for providing an additional burying Ground for the use of the Parish of Saint Pancras, in the County of Middlesex, and for shutting up the present Footpath leading through the Church Yard, and making a commodious one in lieu thereof. (Repealed by St. Pancras Parish Church and Burial Ground Act 1821 (1 & 2 Geo. 4. c. xxiv))
Marines Act 1792 (repealed)	32 Geo. 3. c. 67	11 June 1792
An Act for extending certain Acts therein mentioned to Petty Officers and Seamen, Non-commissioned Officers of Marines, and Marines serving, or who may have served, on Board any of His Majesty's Ships, and residing in Ireland. (Repealed by Pay of the Navy Act 1830 (11 Geo. 4. & 1 Will. 4. c. 20))
Renfrew Roads and Bridges Act 1792 (repealed)	32 Geo. 3. c. 68	8 May 1792
An Act for making effectual the Statute Labour in the County of Renfrew, and for levying Conversion Money in Lieu of Labour in certain Cases, and for otherwise regulating, making, and repairing High Roads and Bridges in the said County. (Repealed by Roads and Bridges (Scotland) Act 1878 (41 & 42 Vict. c. 51) and Local Government (Scotland) Act 1889 (52 & 53 Vict. c. 50))
Manchester and Salford Improvement Act 1792 or the Manchester and Salford Police Act 1792 (repealed)	32 Geo. 3. c. 69	11 June 1792
An Act for cleansing, lighting, watching, and regulating the Streets, Lanes, Passages, and Places within the Towns of Manchester and Salford, in the County Palatine of Lancaster; for widening and rendering more commodious several of the said Streets, Lanes, and Passages; and for other Purposes therein mentioned. (Repealed by Salford Improvement Act 1830 (11 Geo. 4 & 1 Will. 4. c. viii) and Manchester General Improvement Act 1851 (14 & 15 Vict. c. cxix))
Tewkesbury Poor Relief Act 1792 (repealed)	32 Geo. 3. c. 70	11 June 1792
An Act for the better Relief and Employment of the Poor, of and belonging to the Parish of Tewkesbury, in the County of Gloucester. (Repealed by Statute Law (Repeals) Act 2013 (c. 2))
Great and Little Bolton Improvement Act 1792 or the Bolton Improvement Act 1792 (repealed)	32 Geo. 3. c. 71	11 June 1792
An Act for enclosing, dividing, and allotting a certain Common or Waste Ground called Bolton Moor, and other the Commons and Waste Grounds within the Township of Great Bolton, in the County Palatine of Lancaster; and for widening, paving, lighting, watching, cleansing, and regulating the Streets, Lanes, Passages, and Places, within the Towns of Great Bolton and Little Bolton; and for supplying the said Towns with Water, and for providing Fire-Engines and Fire-Men; and for removing and preventing Nuisances, Encroachments, and Annoyances; and for licensing and regulating Hackney Coaches and Chairs within the said Towns. (Repealed by Little Bolton Improvement Act 1830 (11 Geo. 4 & 1 Will. 4. c. xlvi) and Borough of Bolton Act 1850 (13 & 14 Vict. c. xl))
Turner's Patent Act 1792 (repealed)	32 Geo. 3. c. 72	15 June 1792
An Act for vesting in James Turner, his Executors, Administrators, and Assigns, the sole Use and Property of a certain Yellow Colour of his Invention, throughout that Part of Great Britain called England, the Dominion of Wales, and Town of Berwick-upon-Tweed, for a limited Time. (Repealed by Statute Law Revision Act 1948 (11 & 12 Geo. 6. c. 62))
Booth's Patent Act 1792 (repealed)	32 Geo. 3. c. 73	15 June 1792
An Act for more effectually securing to Joseph Booth, and to the Public, the Benefit of a certain Invention or Discovery therein mentioned, for which he hath obtained Letters Patent, under the Great Seal of Great Britain. (Repealed by Statute Law Revision Act 1948 (11 & 12 Geo. 6. c. 62))
Ramsgate Harbour and Sandwich Act 1792	32 Geo. 3. c. 74	11 June 1792
An Act for the Maintenance and Improvement of the Harbour of Ramsgate, in the County of Kent; and for cleansing, amending, and preserving the Haven of Sandwich, in the same County.
Whitehaven Improvement Act 1792	32 Geo. 3. c. 75	15 June 1792
An Act for further enlarging and improving the Harbour of Whitehaven, in the County of Cumberland.
Liverpool Church Act 1792	32 Geo. 3. c. 76	11 June 1792
An Act for building a new Church or Chapel, within the Town and Parish of Liverpool, in the County Palatine of Lancaster.
Gloucestershire Small Debts Act 1792 (repealed)	32 Geo. 3. c. 77	11 June 1792
An Act for the more easy and speedy Recovery of Small Debts, within the Hundreds of Cirencester, Crowthorne, and Minty, Brightwells, Barrow, Rapsgate, Bradley, Bisley, and Longtree, commonly called the Seven Hundreds of Cirencester, in the County of Gloucester. (Repealed by County Courts Act 1846 (9 & 10 Vict. c. 95))
Derby Improvement Act 1792 (repealed)	32 Geo. 3. c. 78	15 June 1792
An Act for paving, cleansing, lighting, and otherwise improving the Streets, Lanes, and other public Passages and Places within the Borough of Derby; and for selling a certain Piece of Waste Ground, situate within the said Borough, called Nun's Green, towards defraying the Expence of the said Improvements. (Repealed by Derby Improvement Act 1825 (6 Geo. 4. c. cxxxii))
Boston Pilotage Act 1792 (repealed)	32 Geo. 3. c. 79	8 May 1792
An Act for amending an Act of the Sixteenth Year of His present Majesty, relating to the Haven and Harbour of Boston, in the County of Lincoln, and for regulating the mooring and removing of Ships and other Vessels within the said Haven and Harbour, and for removing Obstructions therein. (Repealed by Statute Law Revision Act 1950 (14 Geo. 6. c. 6))
Boston Improvement Act 1792	32 Geo. 3. c. 80	8 May 1792
An Act for better paving, cleansing, and otherwise improving the Borough of Boston, in the County of Lincoln.
Birmingham Canal Navigation Act 1792 or the Wyrley and Essington Canal Act 1792 (repealed)	32 Geo. 3. c. 81	30 April 1792
An Act for making and maintaining a Navigable Canal, from or from near Wyrley Bank, in the County of Stafford, to communicate with the Birmingham and Birmingham and Fazeley Canal, at or near the Town of Wolverhampton, in the said County; and also certain Collateral Cuts therein described, from the said intended Canal. (Repealed by Wyrley and Essington Canal Navigation Act 1840 (3 & 4 Vict. c. xxiv))
Bristol Gaol Act 1792 (repealed)	32 Geo. 3. c. 82	15 June 1792
An Act for building a New Gaol, a Penitentiary House, and House of Correction, (Note: Lawford's Gate House of Correction, Bristol) within the City of Bristol, and for regulating, maintaining, and supporting the same; and for disposing of the present Common Gaol of the said City of Bristol, and County of the same City, and for other Purposes. (Repealed by Bristol Gaol Act 1816 (56 Geo. 3. c. lix))
Leigh and Deerhurst Canal Act 1792	32 Geo. 3. c. 83	11 June 1792
An Act for making and maintaining a Navigable Canal from the Foot of Coombe Hill, in the Parish of Leigh, in the County of Gloucester, to join the River Severn at or near a Place called Fisher's, otherwise Fletcher's Leap, in the Parish of Deerhurst, in the said County.
Manchester and Oldham Canal Act 1792	32 Geo. 3. c. 84	11 June 1792
An Act for making a Navigable Canal from Manchester, to or near Ashton-under-Lyne and Oldham, in the County Palatine of Lancaster.
Whitchurch (Salop) Poor Relief Act 1792 (repealed)	32 Geo. 3. c. 85	11 June 1792
An Act for the better Relief and Employment of the Poor, of and within such Part of the Parish of Whitchurch, as maintains its own Poor, and lies within the County of Salop. (Repealed by Statute Law (Repeals) Act 2013 (c. 2))
Broadstairs Pier Act 1792 (repealed)	32 Geo. 3. c. 86	11 June 1792
An Act for repairing or re-building the Pier adjoining to the Harbour of Broadstairs, in the Isle of Thanet, in the County of Kent, and for the better preserving the said Harbour; and for removing and preventing Obstructions, Nuisances, and Annoyances, and regulating the Mooring of Ships and Vessels within the said Harbour. (Repealed by Broadstairs Pier Act 1805 (45 Geo. 3. c. cii) and Broadstairs and St. Peter's Urban District Council Act 1913 (3 & 4 Geo. 5. c. lxiii))
Hereford Cathedral Act 1792	32 Geo. 3. c. 87	11 June 1792
An Act to enable the Dean and Chapter of Hereford to re-build the West End of the Cathedral Church of Hereford, and to repair other Parts thereof.
Lane End Chapel, Stoke upon Trent Act 1792	32 Geo. 3. c. 88	11 June 1792
An Act for re-building the Chapel, and enlarging the Chapel Yard of Lane End, (Note: St John the Baptist, Longton; demolished 1979.) within the Parish of Stoke-upon-Trent, in the County of Stafford.
Leeds Church Act 1792 (repealed)	32 Geo. 3. c. 89	11 June 1792
An Act for building a New Church or Chapel in the Town of Leeds, in the West Riding of the County of York. (Repealed by Leeds Churches Act 1901 (1 Edw. 7. c. cxc))
Sunderland Improvement Act 1792 (repealed)	32 Geo. 3. c. 90	11 June 1792
An Act for building a Bridge across the River Wear, from the Bank or Shore thereof, in the Parish of Bishop Wearmouth, in the County of Durham, to the opposite Shore, in the Parish of Monk Wearmouth, in the same County. (Repealed by Wearmouth Bridge Act 1857 (20 & 21 Vict. c. xxxix))
Land Drained at Great Carlton, Lincolnshire Act 1792 (repealed)	32 Geo. 3. c. 91	11 June 1792
An Act for more effectually draining and preserving certain Low Lands, within the Parish of Great Carlton, in the County of Lincoln. (Repealed by Statute Law Revision Act 1948 (11 & 12 Geo. 6. c. 62))
Beer, Devon, Harbour Act 1792 (repealed)	32 Geo. 3. c. 92	11 June 1792
An Act for making a Harbour in the Cove of Beer, in the County of Devon. (Repealed by Beer Harbour Act 1820 (1 Geo. 4. c. v))
Leith and Bruntisland Ferries, etc. Act 1792 (repealed)	32 Geo. 3. c. 93	11 June 1792
An Act for improving the Communication between the County of Edinburgh and the County of Fife, by the Passages or Ferries cross the Frith of Forth, between Leith and Newhaven, in the County of Edinburgh, and Kinghorn and Bruntisland, in the County of Fife; and for rendering the Harbours and landing Places more commodious. (Repealed by Firth of Forth Bridges Act 1813 (53 Geo. 3. c. cxxv) and Burntisland Pier, Ferry and Road Act 1842 (5 & 6 Vict. c. xci))
Nith Fisheries Act 1792 (repealed)	32 Geo. 3. c. 94	11 June 1792
An Act for regulating and improving the Salmon Fisheries in the River Nith, in the County of Dumfries. (Repealed by Solway Firth Fisheries Act 1804 (44 Geo. 3. c. xlv))
Salop Poor Relief Act 1792 (repealed)	32 Geo. 3. c. 95	11 June 1792
An Act for the better Relief and Employment of the Poor within the several Parishes of Atcham, Wroxeter, Berrington, Cund, Eaton Constantine, Kenley, Leighton, Uffington, and Upton Magna, and the Chapelry of Cressage, in the County of Salop. (Repealed by Statute Law (Repeals) Act 2013 (c. 2))
Montgomery Poor Relief Act 1792 (repealed)	32 Geo. 3. c. 96	11 June 1792
An Act for the better Relief and Employment of the Poor belonging to the Parishes of Montgomery and Pool, and certain other Parishes and Places therein mentioned, in the Counties of Montgomery and Salop. (Repealed by Montgomery and Pool Poor Relief Act 1825 (6 Geo. 4. c. cxxiii))
Whitchurch Bridge Act 1792	32 Geo. 3. c. 97	11 June 1792
An Act for building a Bridge, at or near the Ferry over the River Thames, from Whitchurch in the County of Oxford, to the opposite Shore in the Parish of Pangbourn, in the County of Berks.
Taunton Hospital Act 1792	32 Geo. 3. c. 98	15 June 1792
An Act for appointing Commissioners to sell and dispose of a certain unfinished Building at or near Taunton, in the County of Somerset, intended for a Publick Hospital or Infirmary, and of a Piece of Ground belonging thereto, in case a sufficient Sum of Money shall not be raised by Subscription within a limited Time, for finishing the said Building, and paying the Money due on Account thereof.
Worcester Poor Relief, Burial Ground and Hopmarket Act 1792	32 Geo. 3. c. 99	8 May 1792
An Act for the better Relief and Employment of the Poor of the several Parishes within the City of Worcester, and of the Parishes of Saint Martin and Saint Clement, which are Part within the City of Worcester and Part within the County of Worcester, and for providing a Burial Ground for the use of such Parishes.
Nottingham Canal Act 1792	32 Geo. 3. c. 100	8 May 1792
An Act for making and maintaining a Navigable Canal from the Cromford Canal, in the County of Nottingham, to or near to the Town of Nottingham, and to the River Trent near Nottingham Trent Bridge; and also certain collateral Cuts therein described, from the said intended Canal.
Westmoreland Canals Act 1792	32 Geo. 3. c. 101	11 June 1792
An Act for making and maintaining a Navigable Canal from Kirkby Kendal, in the County of Westmorland, to West Houghton, in the County Palatine of Lancaster; and also a Navigable Branch from the said intended Canal at or near Borwick, to or near Warton Cragg, and also another Navigable Branch from at or near Gale Moss, by Charley, to or near Duxbury, in the said County Palatine of Lancaster.
Monmouthshire Canal Navigation Act 1792	32 Geo. 3. c. 102	11 June 1792
An Act for making and maintaining a Navigable Cut or Canal from or from some Place near Pontnewynydd into the River Usk, at or near the Town of Newport, and a Collateral Cut or Canal from the same, at or near a Place called Cryndau Farm, to or near to Crumlin Bridge, all in the County of Monmouth; and for making and maintaining Railways or Stone Roads, from such Cuts or Canals to several Iron Works and Mines in the Counties of Monmouth and Brecknock.
Portsea Improvement Act 1792 (repealed)	32 Geo. 3. c. 103	11 June 1792
An Act for the better paving, cleansing, widening, and regulating the Streets, Courts, Roads, Lanes, Ways, Rows, Alleys, and Public Passages and Places, within the Town of Portsea, in the County of Southampton; and for removing and preventing Nuisances, Annoyances, and Obstructions within the said Town. (Repealed by Portsea Improvement Act 1843 (6 & 7 Vict. c. xxxv))
Carmarthen Improvement Act 1792 (repealed)	32 Geo. 3. c. 104	11 June 1792
An Act for building a New Gaol and House of Correction, for the Town and County Borough of Carmarthen, and for supplying the said Town and County Borough, and the Liberties thereof with Water; and for paving, watching, lighting, cleansing, and regulating the Streets, Lanes, Ways, Roads and Public Passages, and for widening and making the same more commodious; and removing and preventing Nuisances, Annoyances, and Obstructions therein, and for other Purposes. (Repealed by Carmarthen Gaol, House of Correction, Water Supply, &c Act 1805 (45 Geo. 3. c. ciii) and Dyfed Act 1987 (c. xxiv))
Medway Navigation Act 1792 (repealed)	32 Geo. 3. c. 105	15 June 1792
An Act for improving the Navigation of the River Medway, from the Town of Maidstone, through the several Parishes of Maidstone, Boxley, Allington, and Aylesford, in the County of Kent. (Repealed by Medway Lower Navigation Act 1802 (42 Geo. 3. c. xciv))
Sleaford Navigation Act 1792	32 Geo. 3. c. 106	11 June 1792
An Act for making and maintaining a Navigation from Sleaford Castle Causeway, through the Town of Sleaford, in the County of Lincoln, along the Course of Sleaford Mill Stream and Kyme Eau, to the River Witham, at or near Chappel Hill, in the same County; and for making necessary Cuts for better effecting the said Navigation.
Tattershall Canal Act 1792 or the Horncastle Canal Act 1792	32 Geo. 3. c. 107	11 June 1792
An Act for enlarging and improving the Canal called Tattershall Canal, from the River Witham to the Town of Tattershall, and extending the same into the River Bain, and for making the said River Bain navigable from thence to or into the Town of Horncastle, all in the County of Lincoln; and also for amending and rendering complete the navigable Communication between the said River Witham and the Fosdike Canal, through the High Bridge, in the City of Lincoln.
Isle of Ely Drainage Act 1792	32 Geo. 3. c. 108	11 June 1792
An Act for dividing, allotting, and enclosing the Commons and Waste Grounds, within the Town or Hamlet of March, in the Manor and Parish of Doddington, in the Isle of Ely, and County of Cambridge; and for altering and amending an Act passed in the Thirtieth Year of the Reign of His late Majesty King George the Second, (Note: Isle of Ely Drainage Act 1757 (30 Geo. 2. c. 33)) for draining and preserving certain Fen Lands, Low Grounds, and Commons, in the Townships or Hamlets of March and Wimblington, and in the Parish of Upwell, in the Isle of Ely, and County of Cambridge.
Hull Drainage Act 1792	32 Geo. 3. c. 109	11 June 1792
An Act for dividing, enclosing, draining, and improving the Open Fields, Meadows, Pastures, Commons, and Waste Grounds, within the several Townships or Hamlets of Hessle, Anlaby, and Tranby, in the County of the Town of Kingston-upon-Hull; and for making a Compensation, in Lieu of Tythe, for certain ancient enclosed Lands within the said several Townships or Hamlets, and also within the Township or Hamlet of Wooferton, otherwise Wolfreton, in the same County.
Hexham Inclosure Act 1792	32 Geo. 3. c. 110	11 June 1792
An Act for dividing and enclosing certain Parts of the Commons, Moors, or Tracts of Waste Land, called Hexamshire, and Allendale Common, and also certain Town Fields within the Regality or Manor of Hexam, in the County of Northumberland; and for stinting the Depasturing of the other Parts of the said Commons, Moors, or Waste Lands.
Norwich to Thetford Road Act 1792 (repealed)	32 Geo. 3. c. 111	9 March 1792
An Act for continuing and amending an Act of the Seventh Year of His present Majesty, (Note: Norfolk Roads Act 1766 (7 Geo. 3. c. 76)) for amending the Road from the End of the Town Close, in the County of the City of Norwich, to the Chalk Pits near Thetford, in the County of Norfolk. (Repealed by Norwich and Thetford Road Act 1816 (56 Geo. 3. c. lxviii) and Annual Turnpike Acts Continuance Act 1869 (32 & 33 Vict. c. 90))
Norwich and Swaffham Road Act 1792 (repealed)	32 Geo. 3. c. 112	9 March 1792
An Act for continuing and amending an Act of the Tenth Year of His present Majesty, (Note: Norwich and Swaffham Road Act 1770 (10 Geo. 3. c. 67)) for amending and widening the Road from Saint Benedict's Gate, in the County of the City of Norwich, to Swaffham, in the County of Norfolk, and from Halfpenny Bridge, in Honingham, to the Bounds of Yaxham; and also a Lane called Hangman's Lane, near the Gates of the said City. (Repealed by Norwich and Swaffham Road Act 1835 (5 & 6 Will. 4. c. xl))
Durham and Northumberland Roads Act 1792 (repealed)	32 Geo. 3. c. 113	30 March 1792
An Act for altering, raising, widening, repairing and preserving the Road leading from the North End of the Turnpike Road called The Coal Road, near West Auckland, in the County of Durham, to the Elsdon Turnpike Road at or near Elishaw, in the County of Northumberland; and for erecting, building, and making necessary and convenient Bridges, Mounts, and Batteries upon the same. (Repealed by West Auckland and Elishaw Road Act 1813 (53 Geo. 3. c. xl) and West Auckland and Elishaw Road (Durham, Northumberland) Act 1833 (3 & 4 Will. 4. c. lvi))
Wiltshire Roads Act 1792 (repealed)	32 Geo. 3. c. 114	30 March 1792
An Act for continuing the Term, and altering and enlarging the Powers of an Act of the Thirteenth Year of His present Majesty, (Note: Wilts Roads Act 1773 (13 Geo. 3. c. 101)) for repairing the Road from Cherrill, through Calne to Studley Bridge, and from Cherrill to the Three Mile Borough at the Top of Cherrill Hill, in the County of Wilts; and for more effectually amending the Turnpike Road from Chittoe Heath to the Town of Calne. (Repealed by Road to Studley Bridge Act 1813 (53 Geo. 3. c. cxxviii) and Annual Turnpike Acts Continuance Act 1871 (34 & 35 Vict. c. 115))
Horsham Roads Act 1792 (repealed)	32 Geo. 3. c. 115	30 March 1792
An Act for enlarging the Term, and altering the Powers of an Act made in the Eleventh Year of His present Majesty's Reign, (Note: Sussex Roads (No. 3) Act 1771 (11 Geo. 3. c. 99)) for repairing and widening the Roads from Hand Cross to Corner House, and from thence to the Turnpike Road leading from Horsham to Steyning, and from Corner House aforesaid, to the Maypole in the Town of Henfield, in the County of Sussex; and also for keeping in Repair a certain Branch of Road leading from the Direction Post near a certain Place called The Crab Tree, in the Parish of Beeding, otherwise Seal, through the Parishes of Nuthurst and Horsham, to the Town of Horsham, in the said County. (Repealed by Roads through Cowfold Act 1830 (11 Geo. 4 & 1 Will. 4. c. civ))
Upton, Great Kington and Wellesbourne Hastings Road Act 1792 (repealed)	32 Geo. 3. c. 116	30 March 1792
An Act for enlarging the Term of an Act of the Tenth Year of His present Majesty, (Note: Upton, Great Kington and Wellesbourne Hastings Road Act 1770 (10 Geo. 3. c. 63)) for repairing and widening the Road from Upton, in the Parish of Ratley, to the North End of Bridge Street, in the Town of Great Kington, and from thence to the Guide Post at the Town of Wellesbourne Hastings, in the County of Warwick. (Repealed by Upton, Great Kington and Wellesbourne Hastings Road (Warwickshire) Act 1833 (3 & 4 Will. 4. c. xli))
Kent Roads Act 1792 (repealed)	32 Geo. 3. c. 117	30 March 1792
An Act for repairing and widening the Road leading out of the Turnpike Road from Dover, through Folkestone to Hythe, at a certain Place called Canterbury Lane, within the Liberty of the Town of Folkestone, to a certain Place in the Parish of Folkestone called Mudshole; and for making a new Road from thence, through a certain Field called Yaldergates, through Rainden Wood over Swingfield Minnis, through Denton; and for repairing and widening the Road from thence to the Direction Post on Barham Downs, in the Parish of Barham, at the Four Vents. (Repealed by Folkestone to Barham Downs Turnpike Road Act 1862 (25 & 26 Vict. c. vi))
Boroughbridge and Durham Road Act 1792 (repealed)	32 Geo. 3. c. 118	30 March 1792
An Act for enlarging and altering the Terms and Powers of two Acts of Parliament, made and passed in the Eighteenth (Note: Boroughbridge and Durham Road Act 1744 (18 Geo. 2. c. 8)) and Twenty-second (Note: Boroughbridge and Durham Road Act 1748 (22 Geo. 2. c. 32)) Years of the Reign of His late Majesty King George the Second, for repairing the High Road leading from Boroughbridge, in the County of York, through Northallerton in the same County, to Croft Bridge on the River Tees, and from thence through Darlington, in the County of Durham, to the City of Durham, and for reducing the said Acts into one; and for the more effectually repairing and keeping in Repair the said Road. (Repealed by Boroughbridge and Durham Road Act 1812 (52 Geo. 3. c. xxxviii))
Kingston to Sheetbridge Road Act 1792 (repealed)	32 Geo. 3. c. 119	30 April 1792
An Act for more effectually amending, widening, and keeping in Repair the Road from the Town of Kingston-upon-Thames, in the County of Surrey, to a place called Sheetbridge near Petersfield, in the County of Southampton. (Repealed by Road from Kingston-upon-Thames to Sheetbridge Act 1803 (43 Geo. 3. c. cxi))
Edinburgh Linlithgow and Lanark Roads etc Act 1792 (repealed)	32 Geo. 3. c. 120	11 June 1792
An Act for making, amending, widening, and keeping in Repair the Roads from the New Bridge over the Water of Almond, on the Confines of the Counties of Edinburgh and Linlithgow, by the Town of Bathgate to Baillieston, in the County of Lanerk; and for making, amending, widening, and keeping in Repair certain Branches of Road from the said Line of Road; and for building a Bridge over the Water of Avon at Torphichen Mill; and for discharging the Trustees for executing Two Acts passed in the Twenty-sixth (Note: Glasgow Roads Act 1753 (26 Geo. 2. c. 90)) and Twenty-seventh (Note: Glasgow Roads Act 1754 (27 Geo. 2. c. 27)) Years of the Reign of His late Majesty King George the Second, and Two Acts passed in the Fourteenth (Note: Glasgow Roads (No. 2) Act 1774 (14 Geo. 3. c. 105)) and Thirty-first (Note: Ayr Roads Act 1791 (31 Geo. 3. c. 107)) Years of the Reign of His present Majesty, from the Care of such Part of the Road from Newhouse Inn to Glasgow as leads from the Confines of the Parishes of Monkland and Shotts, to the East Boundary of Baillieston aforesaid, and putting the same under the Power of the Trustees appointed by this Act. (Repealed by Almond Bridge and Baillieston Road Act 1831 (1 Will. 4. c. xliii))
Ayr Roads Act 1792 (repealed)	32 Geo. 3. c. 121	11 June 1792
An Act for enlarging the Term and Powers of an Act, made in the Thirtieth Year of the Reign of His late Majesty King George the Second, (Note: Ayr Roads Act 1757 (30 Geo. 2. c. 57)) so far as relates to the Road leading from Renfrew to Greenock, by Corsehill, and by the Side of the River Clyde, and by Port Glasgow, and the Bridge at Inchinnan; and for more effectually making, and repairing, and altering the Course of the said Road from Renfrew to Greenock; and for making and repairing other Roads connecting therewith, and leading to and from Paisley, in the County of Renfrew, and the Branches thereof; and for shutting up Bye-Roads that are useless to the Publick. (Repealed by Roads and Bridges (Scotland) Act 1878 (41 & 42 Vict. c. 51) and Local Government (Scotland) Act 1889 (52 & 53 Vict. c. 50))
Lanark and Hamilton Roads Act 1792 (repealed)	32 Geo. 3. c. 122	11 June 1792
An Act for making and repairing the Road from the Town of Lanerk to the Town of Hamilton in the County of Lanerk. (Repealed by Lanark and Hamilton Road Act 1813 (53 Geo. 3. c. xiii))
Peebles Roads Act 1792 (repealed)	32 Geo. 3. c. 123	11 June 1792
An Act for enlarging the Terms and Powers of several Acts of the Twenty-sixth Year of His late Majesty's Reign, (Note: Peebles Road Act 1753 (26 Geo. 2. c. 93)) and of the Eleventh (Note: Peebles Road Act 1771 (11 Geo. 3. c. 85)) and Fifteenth (Note: Peebles Roads Act 1775 (15 Geo. 3. c. 71)) Years of His present Majesty's Reign, for repairing the High Roads in the County of Peebles, and for making the said Acts more effectual, and for better regulating the Statute Labour within the said County. (Repealed by Roads in Peebles Act 1809 (49 Geo. 3. c. xxxvi))
Lanark Roads Act 1792 (repealed)	32 Geo. 3. c. 124	11 June 1792
An Act for continuing the Term and altering the Powers of so much of an Act made in the Twelfth Year of the Reign of His present Majesty (Note: Lanark Roads Act 1772 (12 Geo. 3. c. 82)) as relates to the repairing and widening several Roads leading through the County of Lanerk. (Repealed by Roads and Bridges in Lanark Act 1814 (54 Geo. 3. c. ccxv))
Queensferry Roads Act 1792 (repealed)	32 Geo. 3. c. 125	8 May 1792
An Act to enlarge the Term and Powers of an Act made in the Eleventh Year of His present Majesty's Reign, (Note: Linlithgow Roads Act 1771 (11 Geo. 3. c. 79)) intituled, "An Act to enlarge the Term and Powers of so much of an Act made in the Twenty-fourth Year of the Reign of King George the Second, (Note: Edinburgh and Leith Road Act 1750 (24 Geo. 2. c. 35)) as relates to the repairing the Road from Cramond Bridge to the Town of Queensferry, in the County of Linlithgow." (Repealed by Roads from Cramond Bridge to Queensferry and Linlithgow Act 1811 (51 Geo. 3. c. lxiii))
Suffolk Roads Act 1792 (repealed)	32 Geo. 3. c. 126	30 March 1792
An Act for amending, widening and keeping in Repair the several Roads or Branches of Road leading from the Parishes of Yoxford, Saxmundbam, and Benhall, in the County of Suffolk, to the Town of Aldeburgh, in the said County. (Repealed by Aldeburgh Roads Act 1813 (53 Geo. 3. c. xxiv) and Annual Turnpike Acts Continuance Act 1862 (25 & 26 Vict. c. 72))
Durham Roads Act 1792 (repealed)	32 Geo. 3. c. 127	5 April 1792
An Act for amending, widening, and keeping in Repair the Road leading from the Hoodgate, at the West End of the Town of Middleton, in Teesdale, in the County of Durham, to the Gate in the new Enclosure called The Edge, near the Collieries called West Pitts, in the Parish of Saint Andrew's Auckland, in the same County, and also a Branch from the said Road, at or near the Head of the Town of Egleston to Egleston Bridge, over the River Tees. (Repealed by Middleton-in-Teesdale, St. Andrew Auckland and Egleston Bridge Road Act 1808 (48 Geo. 3. c. i) and Middleton-in-Teesdale, St. Andrew Auckland and Egleston Bridge Road Act 1829 (10 Geo. 4. c. xxvii))
Derby and Cheshire Roads Act 1792 (repealed)	32 Geo. 3. c. 128	5 April 1792
An Act for repairing and improving the Road from the Town of Chapel-en-le-Frith, to or near to Enterclough Bridge, in the County of Derby; and also the Road from the Village of Hayfield to Marple Bridge, in the said County; and also the Road from the Village of Glossop, to a certain Gate called Claylands Gate, in the Township of Longdendale, on or near to the Side of the Turnpike Road leading from Mottram to Woodhead, in the County Palatine of Chester. (Repealed by Road from Chapel-en-le-Frith to Enterclough Bridge Act 1807 (47 Geo. 3 Sess. 1. c. viii) and Road from Chapel-en-le-Frith to Enterclough Bridge Act 1827 (7 & 8 Geo. 4. c. xxv))
Cambridge Roads Act 1792 (repealed)	32 Geo. 3. c. 129	5 April 1792
An Act for amending, widening, and keeping in Repair the Road leading from Swanspool Bridge, in the City of Peterborough, in the Town of Thorney, in the Isle of Ely, in the County of Cambridge, and for altering the Course of some Part of the said Road. (Repealed by Road from Peterborough to Thorney Act 1813 (53 Geo. 3. c. lxxxix) and Annual Turnpike Acts Continuance Act 1876 (39 & 40 Vict. c. 39))
Somerset Roads Act 1792 (repealed)	32 Geo. 3. c. 130	5 April 1792
An Act for continuing and amending two Acts of the Twenty-sixth Year of King George the Second, (Note: Somerset Roads (No. 3) Act 1753 (26 Geo. 2. c. 92)) and the Eighteenth Year of His present Majesty, (Note: Somerset Roads Act 1778 (18 Geo. 3. c. 100)) for repairing, amending, and widening the Road leading from the Red Post, in the Parish of Fivehead, through the Towns of Langport and Somerton to Butwell, and several other Roads therein mentioned, in the County of Somerset; and for repairing, amending, and widening certain other Roads within the said County. (Repealed by Langport, Somerton and Castle Cary Roads Act 1824 (5 Geo. 4. c. xcviii))
Leeds to Wakefield Road Act 1792 (repealed)	32 Geo. 3. c. 131	30 April 1792
An Act for enlarging the Term and Powers of two Acts of the Thirty-first Year of King George the Second, (Note: Leeds and Wakefield Road Act 1757 (31 Geo. 2. c. 63)) and the Tenth Year of His present Majesty, (Note: Leeds and Wakefield Road Act 1770 (10 Geo. 3. c. 61)) so far as relates to the Road from Leeds to Wakefield, in the County of York. (Repealed by Road from Leeds to Wakefield Act 1821 (1 & 2 Geo. 4. c. v))
Middleton and Bowes Road Act 1792 (repealed)	32 Geo. 3. c. 132	30 April 1792
An Act to continue the Term of two Acts of the Seventeenth Year of King George the Second, (Note: Middleton and Bowes Road Act 1743 (17 Geo. 2. c. 22)) and the Eleventh Year of His present Majesty, (Note: Middleton and Bowes Road Act 1771 (11 Geo. 3. c. 63)) for repairing the Road leading from the End of Middleton Tyas Lane, over Gatherly Moor, to Greta Bridge, and from thence to Bowes, in the North Riding of the County of York. (Repealed by Middleton and Bowes Road Act 1814 (54 Geo. 3. c. xxxi) and Annual Turnpike Acts Continuance Act 1875 (38 & 39 Vict. c. cxciv) (Note: Incorrectly cited as "38-9 Vict. c. cxviv" in the Chronological Table of the Statutes.))
Yorkshire Roads (No. 2) Act 1792 (repealed)	32 Geo. 3. c. 133	30 April 1792
An Act for enlarging the Term and Powers of an Act passed in the Eleventh Year of the Reign of His present Majesty, intituled, "An Act for repairing and widening the Road from the Low Water Mark of the River Humber, at or near Brough Ferry, in the Parish of Elloughton, in the East Riding of the County of York, to the North End of the Town of Brough, (Note: Brough, Yorkshire.) and from thence through South Cave (Note: South Cave, Yorkshire.) to Coney Clappers, in South Newbald Holmes, (Note: South Newbald, Yorkshire.) in the said Riding." (Note: Yorkshire Roads (No. 3) Act 1771 (11 Geo. 3. c. 71)) (Repealed by Road from Brough Ferry and from Brough to Welton Act 1832 (2 & 3 Will. 4. c. xv))
Buckingham and Hanwell Road Act 1792 (repealed)	32 Geo. 3. c. 134	30 April 1792
An Act for continuing and amending two Acts of the Seventeenth Year of King George the Second, (Note: Buckingham to Warmington Road Act 1743 (17 Geo. 2. c. 43)) and the Ninth Year of His present Majesty, (Note: Buckingham to Hanwell Road Act 1769 (9 Geo. 3. c. 52)) so far as relates to repairing the Road from the Town of Buckingham to the North Extent of the Parish of Hanwell, in the County of Oxford. (Repealed by Buckingham to Hanwell Road Act 1811 (51 Geo. 3. c. ii))
Yorkshire and Durham Roads Act 1792 (repealed)	32 Geo. 3. c. 135	30 April 1792
An Act for enlarging and altering the Terms and Powers of two several Acts of Parliament made and passed in the Twenty-first (Note: Durham Roads Act 1747 (21 Geo. 2. c. 5)) and Twenty-ninth (Note: Yorkshire and Durham Roads Act 1756 (29 Geo. 2. c. 80)) Years of the Reign of His late Majesty King George the Second, for repairing the High Road from the Town of Bowes, in the County of York, to Barnard Castle, in the County of Durham, and from thence through Staindrop to Newgate in Bishop Auckland, and from Newgate, along Gibb Chair, to Gaundless Bridge, and from thence by Melderston Gill, otherwise Cowndon Gill, to the Turnpike Road near Sunderland Bridge, in the County of Durham; and for reducing the said Acts into One, and for the more effectually repairing and keeping in Repair the said Road. (Repealed by Bowes and Sunderland Bridge Road Act 1813 (53 Geo. 3. c. xxv) (Note: Cited as "53 Geo. c. xxv", with the regnal year omitted, in the Chronological Table of the Statutes.) and Annual Turnpike Acts Continuance Act 1870 (33 & 34 Vict. c. 73))
Kingston-upon-Hull and Beverley Road Act 1792 (repealed)	32 Geo. 3. c. 136	30 April 1792
An Act for continuing the Term and enlarging the Powers of two Acts passed in the Seventeenth Year of the Reign of His late Majesty King George the Second, (Note: Kingston-upon-Hull and Beverley Road Act 1743 (17 Geo. 2. c. 25)) and the Fourth Year of the Reign of His present Majesty, (Note: Kingston-upon-Hull and Beverley Road Act 1764 (4 Geo. 3. c. 66)) for repairing the Road between the Town of Kingston-upon-Hull and the Town of Beverley, in the East Riding of the County of York; and for repairing the Road from Newland Bridge to the West End of the Town of Cottingham, in the said Riding. (Repealed by Kingston-upon-Hull and Beverley, and Newland Bridge and Cottingham Roads (Yorkshire, East Riding) Act 1833 (3 & 4 Will. 4. c. xciii))
Wiltshire and Somerset Roads Act 1792 (repealed)	32 Geo. 3. c. 137	30 April 1792
An Act for making, amending, and keeping in Repair a Road from the Bottom of Mason's Lane, near the Town of Bradford, in the County of Wilts, to join the Turnpike Road leading from the City of Bath to Kingsdown, at or near Bathford Bridge, in the County of Somerset. (Repealed by Wiltshire and Somerset Roads and Stokeford Bridge Act 1798 (38 Geo. 3. c. viii))
Sussex Roads Act 1792 (repealed)	32 Geo. 3. c. 138	8 May 1792
An Act to enlarge the Term and Powers of an Act passed in the Eleventh Year of the Reign of His present Majesty King George the Third, (Note: Sussex Roads (No. 2) Act 1771 (11 Geo. 3. c. 98)) for repairing and widening the Road from Hodges to Beadles Hill, and from thence to the Town of Cuckfield, and from Beadles Hill aforesaid, to the Town of Lindfield, and from the Turnpike Road between Cuckfield and Crawley, to the Town of Horsham, and also the Road from Swingate, in the Parish of Burwash, to Shover Green, in the Parish of Ticehurst, all in the County of Sussex. (Repealed by Sussex Roads Act 1813 (53 Geo. 3. c. ccviii) and Roads from Hodges to Cuckfield Act 1833 (3 & 4 Will. 4. c. xliv))
Lancaster Roads Act 1792 (repealed)	32 Geo. 3. c. 139	8 May 1792
An Act for making and maintaining a Road from or nearly from Stand Ege, within Saddleworth, in the West Riding of the County of York, to or near Mump's Brook, in the Township of Oldham, in the Parish of Prestwich, in the County Palatine of Lancaster, and also a Road leading out of the said intended Road through or near Dobcross, to or near a Place called Wall Hill in Saddleworth aforesaid; and also another Road leading out of the said first-mentioned Road at or near a Place called Shaw Hall, to or near a Place called Hollins, all in Saddleworth aforesaid. (Repealed by Standedge and Oldham Road Act 1827 (7 & 8 Geo. 4. c. lxiv))
Worcester and Warwick Roads Act 1792 (repealed)	32 Geo. 3. c. 140	8 May 1792
An Act for enlarging the Term and Powers of two Acts passed in the Twenty-sixth Year of the Reign of King George the Second, (Note: Hagley and Birmingham Road Act 1753 (26 Geo. 2. c. 47)) and the Thirteenth Year of the Reign of His present Majesty, (Note: Worcester and Warwick Roads (No. 2) Act 1773 (13 Geo. 3. c. 107)) for repairing the Road leading from the Market House (Note: Stourbridge Market Hall was located in the middle of the High Street in Stourbridge until 1773, when it demolished. A new market hall was built nearby in 1827 on the corner of the High Street and Market Street, and the facade of this building survives. 52°27′27″N 2°08′50″W) in Stourbridge, and other Roads therein mentioned, in the Counties of Worcester, Stafford, Salop, and Warwick respectively, so far as the said Acts relate to the repairing of the Road from Blakedown Pool, in the Parish of Hagley and County of Worcester, to the Top of Smallbrooke Street, and from the Five Ways (Note: Five Ways, Birmingham. 52°28′21″N 1°55′06″W) to Easy Row, in Birmingham, in the said County of Warwick. (Repealed by Hagley and Birmingham Road Act 1818 (58 Geo. 3. c. xiv))
Warminster Roads Act 1792 (repealed)	32 Geo. 3. c. 141	11 June 1792
An Act for enlarging the Term and Powers of an Act of the Fifth Year of His present Majesty, (Note: Warminster Roads Act 1765 (5 Geo. 3. c. 62)) for repairing several Roads leading from the Town of Warminster, in the County of Wilts; and for amending several other Roads in or near the said Town; for repairing several Roads in and leading through the Town of Warminster; for paving and repairing the Footways, and regulating the Market, within the said Town of Warminster. (Repealed by Warminster Roads Act 1815 (55 Geo. 3. c. lxxxvii))
Collingham to York Road Act 1792 (repealed)	32 Geo. 3. c. 142	11 June 1792
An Act for enlarging the Term and Powers of an Act passed in the Eleventh Year of the Reign of His present Majesty (Note: Collingham to York Road Act 1771 (11 Geo. 3. c. 68)) for repairing and widening the Road from Collingham, through Wetherby, to the City of York. (Repealed by Road from Collingham to York Act 1826 (7 Geo. 4. c. xi))
Salop Roads Act 1792 (repealed)	32 Geo. 3. c. 143	11 June 1792
An Act for continuing the Term and altering and enlarging the Powers of an Act of the Twelfth Year of His present Majesty, (Note: Salop Roads Act 1772 (12 Geo. 3. c. 96)) for repairing, widening, and keeping in Repair the Road from Burlton, in the County of Salop through Knockin to Llanymynech, in the same County, and from Knockin to the East End of the Llanriader Road, and from Place Carrick Lane, to the Turnpike Road from Llanymynech to Oswestry near Coid Issa Mountain, and from Oswestry Turnpike Road on Knockin Heath to the East End of Knockin Lane. (Repealed by Road from Burlington to Llanymynech Act 1814 (54 Geo. 3. c. xxvi) and Annual Turnpike Acts Continuance Act 1876 (39 & 40 Vict. c. 39))
Devon Dorset and Somerset Roads Act 1792 (repealed)	32 Geo. 3. c. 144	11 June 1792
An Act for more effectually amending, widening, and keeping in Repair the Road from Penn Inn, in the County of Dorset, to or near Shipley Lane, in the Parish of Honiton, in the County of Devon, and from Northcote Lane in Honiton aforesaid, to or near Collumpton, in the said County of Devon; and several other Roads in the Counties of Dorset, Devon, and Somerset; and for repealing so much of an Act passed in the Thirty-first Year of the Reign of King George the Second, intituled, "An Act for repairing and widening several Roads in the Counties of Dorset and Devon, leading to and through the Borough of Lyme Regis," (Note: Dorset and Devon Roads Act 1757 (31 Geo. 2. c. 43)) as relates to the Road from Fair Mile Inn to Straightway Head, otherwise Stretwood Head, in the Parish of Whimple, in the said County of Devon. (Repealed by Honiton Roads Act 1822 (3 Geo. 4. c. xcviii) and Axminster Roads Act 1822 (3 Geo. 4. c. cv))
Northumberland and Durham Roads Act 1792 (repealed)	32 Geo. 3. c. 145	11 June 1792
An Act for repairing and improving the Road leading from Cornhill Burn, by Pallinsburn and Flodden Lane, to Milfield March Burn, and by Ford Bridge to Lowick; and also several other Roads therein mentioned, all in the Counties of Northumberland and Durham. (Repealed by Roads from Cornhill Burn Act 1813 (53 Geo. 3. c. xci) and Ford and Lowick Turnpikes Act 1835 (5 & 6 Will. 4. c. xxvii))
Gloucester Roads Act 1792 (repealed)	32 Geo. 3. c. 146	11 June 1792
An Act for amending, widening, altering, and repairing the Roads from Swell Wold, in the Parish of Lower Swell, in the County of Gloucester, to or near the Sixth Mile Stone in the Turnpike Road leading from the Borough of Tewkesbury to the Town of Stow, in the same County, and from the North East End of the Swan Lane, in the Parish of Cheltenham, in the same County, to the Turnpike Road leading to Evesham, in the Parish of Sedgeborough, in the County of Worcester, and from the Town of Winchcomb, in the said County of Gloucester, by a Place called Stamp Cross, to or near the Tenth Mile Stone on the said Turnpike Road leading from Tewkesbury to Stow aforesaid. (Repealed by Roads from Swell Wold, Cheltenham and Winchcomb Act 1833 (3 & 4 Will. 4. c. xi))
Sussex Roads (No. 2) Act 1792 (repealed)	32 Geo. 3. c. 147	11 June 1792
An Act to enlarge the Term and alter and amend the Powers of Two several Acts, passed in the Thirty-second Year of the Reign of King George the Second, (Note: Lewes and Eastbourne Road Act 1758 (32 Geo. 2. c. 67)) and the Twentieth Year of the Reign of His present Majesty, (Note: Sussex Roads Act 1780 (20 Geo. 3. c. 83)) for repairing the Road from the South End of the South Street, in the Parish of South Malling, near the Town of Lewes, to Glynd Bridge, and from thence through Firle Street, under the Hill, to Longbridge, in the Parish of Alfriston, in the County of Sussex; (except so far as the said Acts relate to that Part of the said Road which lies between a Place commonly called Bopeep, in the Parish of Alfriston, and Longbridge aforesaid;) and for amending and keeping in Repair several other Roads therein mentioned, in the said County of Sussex. (Repealed by Lewes and Eastbourne, and Polegate and Hailsham Roads Act 1819 (59 Geo. 3. c. x))
Norfolk Roads Act 1792 (repealed)	32 Geo. 3. c. 148	11 June 1792
An Act for repairing and improving the Road leading from the Town of Bury Saint Edmunds, in the County of Suffolk, to and through the Town of Thetford, in the Counties of Norfolk and Suffolk to the present Turnpike Road leading from Lynn, through the Parish of Cranwich, in the said County of Norfolk. (Repealed by Statute Law (Repeals) Act 2008 (c. 12))
Berwick Roads Act 1792	32 Geo. 3. c. 149	11 June 1792
An Act for repealing an Act of the Twelfth Year of His present Majesty, intituled, "An Act for repairing and widening the Roads from the Confines of the County of Berwick, at or near Banghouse Walls, to Compton's Lanes and Eymouth, and from the Town of Eccles to Eymouth, and from Whitelaw Muir to Compton's Lanes, in the County of Berwick;" (Note: Berwick Roads Act 1772 (12 Geo. 3. c. 97)) and for repairing, widening, and amending several Roads, and for regulating the Statute Labour, in the said County of Berwick. (Repealed by Roads in Berwick (County) and Whitadder Bridge Act 1811 (51 Geo. 3. c. xl))
Great Farringdon to Burford Road Act 1792 (repealed)	32 Geo. 3. c. 150	11 June 1792
An Act for enlarging the Term and Powers of an Act passed in the Eleventh Year of the Reign of His present Majesty, (Note: Farringdon to Burford Road Act 1771 (11 Geo. 3. c. 84)) for repairing, widening, turning, and altering the Road from the Market House in the Town of Great Farringdon, in the County of Berks, to Burford, in the County of Oxford. (Repealed by Road from Great Faringdon to Burford (Berkshire, Oxfordshire) Act 1833 (3 & 4 Will. 4. c. lxxiii))
Kent and Surrey Roads Act 1792 (repealed)	32 Geo. 3. c. 151	11 June 1792
An Act for enlarging the Term and Powers of an Act passed in the Tenth Year of the Reign of His present Majesty, (Note: Kent and Surrey Roads Act 1770 (10 Geo. 3. c. 62)) for repairing, widening, and keeping in Repair the Road leading from the Eaton Bridge Turnpike Road at Cockham Hill, in the Parish of Westerham, in the County of Kent, through the Village of Limpsfield, to the Village of Titsey, over Botley Hill, Worms Heath, and Wallingham Common, to the Turnpike Road leading from Croydon to Godstone, in the County of Surrey. (Repealed by Westerham and Godstone Road Act 1813 (53 Geo. 3. c. xliii) and Annual Turnpike Acts Continuance Act 1869 (32 & 33 Vict. c. 90))
Glasgow Roads Act 1792 (repealed)	32 Geo. 3. c. 152	11 June 1792
An Act for enlarging the Term and Powers of an Act made in the Fourteenth Year of the Reign of His present Majesty, intituled, "An Act to continue the Term of Two Acts, made in the Twenty-sixth and Twenty-seventh Years of the Reign of His late Majesty King George the Second, for repairing several Roads leading into the City of Glasgow, so far as the same relate to the Roads from the City of Glasgow to Yoker Bridge, to Renfrew Bridge, to the Three Mile House, to the Town of Airdrie, and from the Village of Gorbals to the Chapel of Cambuslang, in the Counties of Lanerk and Renfrew," so far as the said Act relates to the Road from the City of Glasgow to Yoker Bridge; and for more effectually making, widening, repairing, and keeping in Repair the said Road, and the Road of Communication between the said Road from Glasgow to Yoker Bridge, and the Canal from the Forth to the Clyde. (Repealed by Road from Glasgow to Yoker Bridge Act 1824 (5 Geo. 4. c. cxi))
Gloucester and Wiltshire Roads Act 1792 (repealed)	32 Geo. 3. c. 153	11 June 1792
An Act for repairing, widening, turning, and altering the Road leading from the Town of Burford, in the County of Oxford, to Leachlade, in the County of Gloucester, and for making a Road from thence to the River Isis or Thames; for building a Bridge across the said River, and for making a Road from thence to join the present Road leading from Leachlade to Inglesham; and for repairing, widening, turning, and altering the said last mentioned Road, to and through the Town of Highworth, in the County of Wilts, to the present Turnpike Road leading from Cricklade to Swindon, in the same County. (Repealed by Burford, Lechdale and Swindon Turnpike Roads Act 1853 (16 & 17 Vict. c. civ))
Glasgow Roads (No. 2) Act 1792 (repealed)	32 Geo. 3. c. 154	11 June 1792
An Act for altering and enlarging the Powers of an Act passed in the Thirty-first Year of the Reign of His present Majesty, (Note: Ayr Roads Act 1791 (31 Geo. 3. c. 107)) for repairing the Roads from Livingston, by the Kirk of Shotts, to the City of Glasgow, and other Roads therein mentioned; and for building a Bridge over the River Clyde, at or near Theevesford, and for opening and making certain Streets, in and near the City of Glasgow; for altering a Part of the High Road betwixt Edinburgh and Glasgow, by carrying a new Line of Road to the North of the Hills, and another Line of Road by the South, and for straightening and making the Roads more convenient; and also for altering the Road from the City of Glasgow to the Town of Hamilton, and for building a Bridge over the River Clyde below the present old Bridge, called Bothwell Bridge; as also for altering the Road from the Town of Hamilton Eastward, until it joins the Great Road between Edinburgh and Glasgow. (Repealed by Livingston and Glasgow Road Act 1814 (54 Geo. 3. c. ccii))
Tadcaster Bridge and Hob Moor Lane Road Act 1792 (repealed)	32 Geo. 3. c. 155	11 June 1792
An Act for continuing the Term and enlarging the Powers of two Acts passed in the Eighteenth Year of the Reign of His late Majesty King George the Second, (Note: Tadcaster Bridge and Hob Moor Lane Road Act 1744 (18 Geo. 2. c. 16)) and the Eleventh Year of the Reign of His present Majesty, (Note: Tadcaster and York Road Act 1771 (11 Geo. 3. c. 83)) for repairing the Road leading from Tadcaster Bridge, (Note: Tadcaster Bridge, Tadcaster, North Yorkshire. 53°53′06″N 1°15′36″W) within the County of the City of York, to a Place near the said City called Hobmoor Lane End. (Note: The lane to Hob Moor from the A1063 Tadcaster Road, York, at the site of York Tyburn. 53°56′47″N 1°06′06″W) (Repealed by Tadcaster Bridge and Hob Moor Lane Road Act 1833 (3 & 4 Will. 4. c. lxxxiii))
Carmarthen Roads Act 1792 (repealed)	32 Geo. 3. c. 156	11 June 1792
An Act for repairing, altering, and improving the Road from Golden Grove Park, in the Parish of Llandilofawr, to the Turnpike Road leading from the New Bridge over the River Towy to the Lime Kilns in the Parish of Llandarog, and also several other Roads therein mentioned, all in the County of Carmarthen. (Repealed by Three Commotts District of Roads (Carmarthen) Act 1832 (2 & 3 Will. 4. c. cii) and South Wales Turnpike Trusts Act 1844 (7 & 8 Vict. c. 91))
Stafford Roads Act 1792 (repealed)	32 Geo. 3. c. 157	11 June 1792
An Act for repealing an Act passed in the Eleventh Year of the Reign of His present Majesty, (Note: Staffordshire Roads Act 1771 (11 Geo. 3. c. 86)) for repairing and widening the Road from Stone to Lane End, (Note: Lane End is now part of Longton, Staffordshire.) and to the Road between Leek and Sandon, on Meir Heath, and from Meir to Trentham, and from thence to Stableford, in the County of Stafford, and for granting other Powers for those Purposes; and for repairing and improving the Road from a Place called Walton, in Stone aforesaid, to Eccleshall, in the said County of Stafford. (Repealed by Trentham and Stone Roads Act 1843 (6 & 7 Vict. c. xxvi))
Norfolk Roads Act 1792 (repealed)	32 Geo. 3. c. 158	11 June 1792
An Act for continuing the Term, and altering and enlarging the Powers of an Act passed in the Twelfth Year of the Reign of His present Majesty, (Note: Norfolk Roads Act 1772 (12 Geo. 3. c. 98)) for repairing and widening the Road leading from the East End of the Bridge (Note: Downham Bridge, carrying the A1122 road over the River Great Ouse, Downham Market, Norfolk. 52°36′01″N 0°21′26″E) across the River Ouze in Downham Market, to the Queen's Head, and from the Chequer Inn, in Downham Market aforesaid, to the East End of The Two Mile Close, in the Parish of Barton, and towards Watton to a Place called The Devil's Ditch, in the County of Norfolk; and for stopping up the Road leading from Stradset, through Barton Layes, towards Watton. (Repealed by Downham Market, Barton and Devil's Ditch Road Act 1832 (2 & 3 Will. 4. c. xxi))
Dunstable to Hockliffe Road Act 1792 (repealed)	32 Geo. 3. c. 159	15 June 1792
An Act for amending and more effectually repairing the Road from the Black Bull Inn, in Dunstable, in the County of Bedford, to the King's Arms, in Hockliffe, in the said County. (Repealed by Road from Dunstable to Hockliffe Act 1814 (54 Geo. 3. c. cxxi) and Statute Law (Repeals) Act 2013 (c. 2))
Stafford Roads (No. 2) Act 1792 (repealed)	32 Geo. 3. c. 160	15 June 1792
An Act to continue the Term, and alter and enlarge the Powers of an Act, passed in the Eleventh Year of the Reign of His present Majesty, (Note: Staffordshire Roads (No. 2) Act 1771 (11 Geo. 3. c. 87)) for repairing and widening the Road from Shelton, to the Road between Cheadle and Leek, and from Bucknall to Weston Coyney, and from the Road between Cheadle and Leek, to the Turnpike Road above Frogall Bridge, and from the same Road to the Road between Blyth Marsh and Thorp, at or near Ruchill Gate, in the County of Stafford, so far as the same relates to the Road from Shelton to Blakeley Lane Head, and from Bucknall to Weston Coyney. (Repealed by Road from Shelton to Blakeley Lane Head and from Bucknall to Weston Coyney Act 1813 (53 Geo. 3. c. cxxxv) and Annual Turnpike Acts Continuance Act 1877 (40 & 41 Vict. c. 64))

=== Private and personal acts ===
Short title	Citation	Royal assent
Long title
Davallon's Naturalization Act 1792	32 Geo. 3. c. 1 Pr.	9 March 1792
An Act for Naturalizing John Baptist Davallon.
Avebury Inclosure Act 1792	32 Geo. 3. c. 2 Pr.	30 March 1792
An Act for dividing and allotting several Open and Common Lands and Grounds within the Parish of Avebury, in the County of Wilts.
Croscombe and Dinder (Somerset) Inclosure Act 1792	32 Geo. 3. c. 3 Pr.	30 March 1792
An Act for dividing and enclosing certain Commons or Waste Lands, being Parts of Mendip, Lyatt, and Dinder Hill, within the Parishes of Croscombe and Dinder, in the County of Somerset.
Beckett's Name Act 1792	32 Geo. 3. c. 4 Pr.	30 March 1792
An Act to enable Gilbert Trowe Beckett Esquire, and his Issue Male, to take the Name and bear the Arms of Turner, pursuant to the Will of Martha Turner Widow, deceased.
Walker's Naturalization Act 1792	32 Geo. 3. c. 5 Pr.	30 March 1792
An Act for naturalizing Richard Walker.
Naturalization of John Doxat and Charles Brandt Act 1792	32 Geo. 3. c. 6 Pr.	30 March 1792
An Act for naturalizing John Alphonso Doxat, and Charles Frederick Brandt.
Naturalization of John Gourgas and James Soret Act 1792	32 Geo. 3. c. 7 Pr.	30 March 1792
An Act for naturalizing John Mark Gourgas, and James Soret.
Naturalization of John Hentig and Jacob Anderson Act 1792	32 Geo. 3. c. 8 Pr.	30 March 1792
An Act for naturalizing John William Hentig, and Jacob Anderson.
Schroder's Naturalization Act 1792	32 Geo. 3. c. 9 Pr.	30 March 1792
An Act for naturalizing Herman Schroder.
Carr's Estate Act 1792	32 Geo. 3. c. 10 Pr.	5 April 1792
An Act to enable Trustees to cut down and sell Timber upon the Estates devised and settled by the Will of Ralph Carr Esquire; and to invest the Monies arising therefrom, in the Purchase of Lands and Hereditaments, to be settled to the Uses of the Will, and for other Purposes therein mentioned.
Walton-on-the-Wolds Inclosure Act 1792	32 Geo. 3. c. 11 Pr.	5 April 1792
An Act for dividing and enclosing the Open Fields, Meadows, Pastures, Commons, and Waste Grounds within the Parish of Walton-in-the-Woulds, in the County of Leicester.
Balliol College Oxford and City of London Estates Act 1792	32 Geo. 3. c. 12 Pr.	30 April 1792
An Act for carrying into Execution an Agreement between the Master and Scholars of Balliol College, in the University of Oxford, and the Mayor and Commonalty and Citizens of the City of London, for vesting in the said Mayor and Commonalty and Citizens, and their Successors, certain Ground and Buildings in the Parish of Saint Lawrence Jewry, London, and for securing to the said Master and Scholars, and their Successors, certain yearly Rents in lieu thereof.
Raybould's Divorce Act 1792	32 Geo. 3. c. 13 Pr.	30 April 1792
An Act to dissolve the Marriage of William Raybould with Joannah Pearsall his now Wife, and to enable him to marry again; and for other Purposes therein mentioned.
Larking's Divorce Act 1792	32 Geo. 3. c. 14 Pr.	30 April 1792
An Act to dissolve the Marriage of John Larking Esquire, with Elizabeth Marcon his now Wife, and to enable him to marry again; and for other Purposes therein mentioned.
Wilmot's Divorce Act 1792	32 Geo. 3. c. 15 Pr.	30 April 1792
An Act to dissolve the Marriage of John Wilmot Esquire, with Fanny Sainthill his now Wife, and to enable him to marry again; and for other Purposes therein mentioned.
Knooke Inclosure Act 1792	32 Geo. 3. c. 16 Pr.	30 April 1792
An Act for dividing and allotting in Severalty, the Open and Common Fields and Downs, Common Meadows, Common Pastures, and Commonable Places, in the Parish of Knooke, in the County of Wilts.
North Grimston Inclosure Act 1792	32 Geo. 3. c. 17 Pr.	30 April 1792
An Act for dividing and enclosing certain Open Fields and Grounds within the Parish of North Grimston, in the East Riding of the County of York.
Redmile Inclosure Act 1792	32 Geo. 3. c. 18 Pr.	30 April 1792
An Act for dividing and enclosing the Open Common Fields, and other Commonable Lands within the Parish of Redmile, in the County of Leicester.
Wood Enderby Inclosure Act 1792	32 Geo. 3. c. 19 Pr.	30 April 1792
An Act for dividing and enclosing the Open and Common Fields, Common Pastures, Ings, Common Meadows, and other Commonable Lands, in the Parish of Wood Enderby, in the County of Lincoln.
Broadwell Inclosure Act 1792	32 Geo. 3. c. 20 Pr.	30 April 1792
An Act for dividing and enclosing the Open and Common Fields, Common Meadows, Common Pastures, Commonable Lands, and Waste Grounds within the Parish of Broadwell, in the County of Gloucester.
Turkdean Inclosure Act 1792	32 Geo. 3. c. 21 Pr.	30 April 1792
An Act for dividing and enclosing the Open Fields, Downs, Commons, and Commonable Lands within the Parish of Turkdean, in the County of Gloucester.
Aynho Inclosure Act 1792	32 Geo. 3. c. 22 Pr.	30 April 1792
An Act for dividing and enclosing the Open and Common Fields, Common Meadows, Common Pastures, and other Commonable Places in the Parish of Aynho, in the County of Northampton.
Reedsdale and Corsendide (Northumberland) Inclosure Act 1792	32 Geo. 3. c. 23 Pr.	30 April 1792
An Act for dividing, allotting, and enclosing, certain Waste Lands, Moors, or Commons, within the Manor of Reedsdale, and Parish of Corsenside, in the County of Northumberland.
Blackburne's Estate Act 1792	32 Geo. 3. c. 24 Pr.	8 May 1792
An Act for vesting a Leasehold Estate late of John Blackburne Esquire, deceased, in Trustees, to be sold, and for applying the Money arising therefrom in the Manner therein mentioned.
Tydd St. Mary Inclosure Act 1792	32 Geo. 3. c. 25 Pr.	8 May 1792
An Act for dividing and enclosing the Common Marsh and other Waste Grounds in the Parish of Tydd Saint Mary, in the County of Lincoln.
Ogbourne St. George (Wiltshire) allotment of lands.	32 Geo. 3. c. 26 Pr.	8 May 1792
An Act for dividing, allotting, and laying in Severalty, the Open and Common Fields, Common Pastures, and other Commonable Lands or Grounds within the Parish of Ogbourn Saint George, in the County of Wilts.
Francis Foljambe's, Earl Fitzwilliam's and Lord Hawke's Estates Act 1792	32 Geo. 3. c. 27 Pr.	11 June 1792
An Act for effectuating certain Exchanges between the Right Honourable the Earl Fitzwilliam and Francis Ferrand Foljambe Esquire, and to enable Trustees to make future Exchanges of a detached Part of the Estates of the said Francis Ferrand Foljambe.
Baron de Clifford's Estate Act 1792	32 Geo. 3. c. 28 Pr.	11 June 1792
An Act for discharging part of the Leasehold Estates of Edward Baron de Clifford in Spring Garden, in Middlesex, from the Pin Money Jointure and younger Children's Portions secured thereon, and for making such Portions the first Charge upon the Residue of the Funds subjected thereto, and for empowering the Trustees of the said Baron de Clifford to sell the Remainder of the said Leaseholds, and apply the Produce upon the Trusts of his Marriage Settlement, and, until Sale, to grant building and repairing Leases.
Murray's Estate Act 1792	32 Geo. 3. c. 29 Pr.	11 June 1792
An Act for vesting the Lands and Estates of Melgund and Kynnyndmond, and other Lands and Estates comprized in the Deed of Entail, executed by the deceased Sir Alexander Murray Baronet, upon the Thirteenth Day of September One thousand seven hundred and ten, in Trustees, in Trust to sell the same, and invest the Money arising by such Sale in the Purchase of other Lands, to be settled and secured to the same Series of Heirs, and under the same Conditions and Limitations, as are contained in the aforesaid Deed of Entail.
Bristol Cathedral Estate Act 1792	32 Geo. 3. c. 30 Pr.	11 June 1792
An Act for enabling the Dean and Chapter of the Cathedral Church of the Holy and Undivided Trinity of Bristol, to grant a Lease of Part of the Lands of the said Dean and Chapter, in the Parish of Saint Michael-the-Archangel, in the City of Bristol, for the Purpose of building thereon.
Trehawke's Estate Act 1792	32 Geo. 3. c. 31 Pr.	11 June 1792
An Act for vesting in Trustees the legal Estate in Fee-Simple, of divers Manors and other Hereditaments, mortgaged or conveyed in Trust to John Trehawke Esquire, deceased, after the Date of his Will.
St. Mary Islington Act 1792	32 Geo. 3. c. 32 Pr.	11 June 1792
An Act to enable the Vicar of the Parish and Parish Church of Saint Mary Islington, in the County of Middlesex, to grant building Leases of certain Glebe Lands belonging to the said Vicarage.
Reverend John Taylor and Harry Elderton: confirming and executing an agreement for the grant of a building lease of ground belonging to Clifton Curacy (Gloucestershire).	32 Geo. 3. c. 33 Pr.	11 June 1792
An Act for confirming and carrying into Execution certain Articles of Agreement, made and entered into between the Reverend John Taylor, Curate of the Curacy of Clifton, in the Parish of Westbury-upon-Trym, in the County of Gloucester, and Harry Elderton, of the City of Bristol, Gentleman, for granting a building Lease of a certain Piece or Parcel of Ground belonging to the said Curacy.
Goldsworthy's Estate Act 1792	32 Geo. 3. c. 34 Pr.	11 June 1792
An Act to empower Philip Goldsworthy Esquire, Tenant for Life under the Will of Martha Gashry, deceased, to grant building or repairing Leases.
Tonge's Estate Act 1792	32 Geo. 3. c. 35 Pr.	11 June 1792
An Act to enable the Trustees in the Settlement executed on the Marriage of Henry Tonge Esquire, and Ann Eliza his Wife, to sell and dispose of a Capital Messuage or Mansion House, and other Hereditaments, in the County of Somerset, and to lay out the Money arising from the Sale thereof, in the Purchase of Old South Sea Annuities, upon the Trusts of the said Settlement.
Griffith's Estate Act 1792	32 Geo. 3. c. 36 Pr.	11 June 1792
An Act for vesting the settled Estates of Thomas Griffith Esquire, and Henrietta Maria his Wife, in the Parish of Kiddington alias Cuddington, in the County of Chester, and in the Parishes of Llanvilling and Penant, in the County of Montgomery, in Sir Richard Brooke Baronet, as Mortgagee in Fee-simple; and for vesting the Equity of Redemption thereof, in the said Thomas Griffith, and His Heirs, and for settling an Estate of the said Thomas Griffith, in the Parish of Mold, in the County of Flint, in Lieu thereof.
Curtis's Estate Act 1792	32 Geo. 3. c. 37 Pr.	11 June 1792
An Act to enable Edward Curtis, during his Life, and after his Death the Guardians of his Children, during their Minority, to grant building Leases of certain Pieces of Ground at Clifton, in the County of Gloucester.
Daniel's Estate Act 1792	32 Geo. 3. c. 38 Pr.	11 June 1792
An Act for vesting certain settled Leasehold Lands and Tenements of Edward Daniel Gentleman, and Catherine his Wife, in that Part of the Parish of Clifton which lies within the City of Bristol, in Trustees, to be sold, and for applying the Money arising from the Sale thereof in the Purchase of other Lands, to be settled upon the Trusts of the said settled Estates.
Churchill's Estate Act 1792	32 Geo. 3. c. 39 Pr.	11 June 1792
An Act to enable the Heir or Heirs at Law of the surviving Trustee of Lands and Hereditaments in the Parishes of Chalfont Saint Peters, and Iver, in the County of Bucks, purchased with Part of the personal Estate of Charles Churchill Esquire deceased, by virtue of an Act of Parliament, made in the Twenty-third Year of the Reign of His late Majesty King George the Second, (Note: Churchill's Personal Estate Act 1749 (23 Geo. 2. c. 18 Pr.)) to sell and convey the same Lands and Hereditaments for a Consideration to be paid into the Hands of the Trustees of the personal Estate of Charles Churchill Esquire deceased; and also to enable the said Trustees to invest the said Purchase Money, and other the said personal Estate, in the Purchase of other Lands and Hereditaments to be settled to the Uses, and with the Limitations mentioned in the said Act of Parliament, and again to sell and dispose of the same Lands and Hereditaments, and any other Lands that may be purchased under the same Act or by virtue of this Act, and to invest the Purchase Monies arising therefrom either in the public Funds, or upon Securities, or in the Purchase of other Lands and Hereditaments, to be conveyed to the same Uses.
Campbell's Estate Act 1792	32 Geo. 3. c. 40 Pr.	11 June 1792
An Act for vesting those Parts of the Lands and Estate of Blythswood and others, which lie in the County of Lanerk, in Trustees, for the Purpose of selling or feuing the same; and for investing the Money arising by such Sale in the Purchase of other Lands and Estates, more commodious and contiguous to the other and greater Part of the said Estate of Blythswood, which lies in the County of Renfrew; and for settling and securing the Lands and Estates so to be purchased, to and in Favour of the same Series of Heirs, in Fee-Tail, and under the same Restrictions, Conditions, and Limitations, as are mentioned and contained in a Deed of Entail, made in the Year One thousand seven hundred and thirty-nine, by Colin Campbell of Blythswood, deceased.
Templer's Estate Act 1792	32 Geo. 3. c. 41 Pr.	11 June 1792
An Act to subject and charge a competent Part of the settled Estates of James Templer Esquire, in the County of Devon, with a Sum of Money to be applied and disposed of, for the Purposes therein mentioned.
Edwin's Estate Act 1792	32 Geo. 3. c. 42 Pr.	11 June 1792
An Act for vesting certain Messuages, Lands, and other Hereditaments, in the Counties of Berks and Bucks, (being the Estates devised and settled by the Will of Catherine Edwin Spinster, deceased,) in Trustees, to be sold and conveyed to John Martindale Esquire and his Heirs; and for laying out the Money arising by such Sale in the Purchase of other Lands and Hereditaments, to be more conveniently situate as therein mentioned, to be settled to the same Uses as the said settled Estates now stand settled by the said Will.
Prestwich-cum-Oldham Glebe Lands (Lancashire): enabling grant of leases.	32 Geo. 3. c. 43 Pr.	11 June 1792
An Act to enable the Rector of the Parish and Parish Church of Prestwich-cum-Oldham, in the County Palatine of Lancaster, for the Time being, to grant Leases of the Glebe belonging to the said Rectory.
Daniel and Letitia Leo's and Mary Puleston's Estates Act 1792	32 Geo. 3. c. 44 Pr.	11 June 1792
An Act for confirming and rendering effectual, a Partition between Daniel Leo Esquire, and Letitia his Wife, and Mary Puleston Widow, of several Estates in the Counties of Flint, Denbigh, and Caernarvon, late the Estates of John Davies, of Llanerth, Esquire, and for other Purposes therein mentioned.
Duke of Norfolk's and Francis Foljambe's Estates Act 1792	32 Geo. 3. c. 45 Pr.	11 June 1792
An Act for effectuating and establishing an Exchange agreed upon between Charles Duke of Norfolk and Francis Ferrand Foljambe Esquire, of certain Lands and other Hereditaments, in the Counties of York, Nottingham, and Derby.
Welton-in-the-Marsh Inclosure Act 1792	32 Geo. 3. c. 46 Pr.	11 June 1792
An Act for dividing and enclosing the Open Fields and other Commonable and Waste Lands within the Parish of Welton-in-the-Marsh, in the County of Lincoln.
Uffington Inclosure Act 1792	32 Geo. 3. c. 47 Pr.	11 June 1792
An Act for dividing and enclosing the Common and Open Fields, Meadows, Commonable Lands, and Waste Grounds, in the Parish of Uffington, in the County of Lincoln.
Stanley Inclosure Act 1792	32 Geo. 3. c. 48 Pr.	11 June 1792
An Act for dividing and enclosing the Common and Waste Grounds within the Manor or Liberty of Stanley, in the County of Derby.
Syerston Inclosure Act 1792	32 Geo. 3. c. 49 Pr.	11 June 1792
An Act for dividing and enclosing the Open Arable Fields, Meadows, Commons, and Waste Grounds, within the Township of Syerston, in the County of Nottingham.
Tealby Inclosure Act 1792	32 Geo. 3. c. 50 Pr.	11 June 1792
An Act for dividing and enclosing the Open Common Fields, Moors, Meadows, and Pastures, and other Commonable Lands and Waste Grounds, in the Parish of Tealby, otherwise Tevilby, in the County of Lincoln.
Colton Inclosure Act 1792	32 Geo. 3. c. 51 Pr.	11 June 1792
An Act for enclosing and leasing, or letting certain Commons or Waste Grounds, lying within the Parish of Colton, in the County of Stafford, and applying the Profits thereof in Aid of the Poor's Rate in the said Parish, and for making Exchanges of Lands with the said Parish.
Mendip Forest Inclosure Act 1792	32 Geo. 3. c. 52 Pr.	11 June 1792
An Act for dividing, allotting, and enclosing, a Tract of Common or Waste Land, Part of the Forest of Mendip, lying within the Manors of East Horrington and Chilcot in the Out Parish of Saint Cuthbert-in-Wells, in the County of Somerset.
Stathern Inclosure Act 1792	32 Geo. 3. c. 53 Pr.	11 June 1792
An Act for dividing and enclosing the Open and Common Fields, Meadows, Pastures, and other Commonable Lands and Waste Grounds within the Parish of Stathern, in the County of Leicester.
Mold Inclosure Act 1792	32 Geo. 3. c. 54 Pr.	11 June 1792
An Act for dividing, allotting, and enclosing the Commons and Waste Lands within the Manor and Parish of Mold, in the County of Flint.
Cheslyn Common Inclosure Act 1792	32 Geo. 3. c. 55 Pr.	11 June 1792
An Act for dividing and enclosing the Open and Common Fields, Common Meadows, and Waste Lands, called Cheslyn Common, in the Liberties of Great Saredon, Little Saredon, and Great Wyrley, in the County of Stafford.
West Ayton Inclosure Act 1792	32 Geo. 3. c. 56 Pr.	11 June 1792
An Act to extend the Powers and Provisions of an Act of the Thirtieth Year of His present Majesty, for dividing and enclosing the Open Fields, Ings, Commons, and Waste Grounds, within the Manor and Township of Hutton Bushell, in the North Riding of the County of York, to the Township of West Ayton, in the Parish of Hutton Bushell aforesaid.
Monk Fryston Inclosure Act 1792	32 Geo. 3. c. 57 Pr.	11 June 1792
An Act for dividing and enclosing the several Open Common Fields, Meadows, Ings, Commons, and Waste Grounds, within the Manor and Township of Monk Fryston, in the West Riding of the County of York.
Tockwith Inclosure Act 1792	32 Geo. 3. c. 58 Pr.	11 June 1792
An Act for dividing and enclosing the Open Arable Fields, Ings, Meadows, Commons, and Waste Grounds, within the Township of Tockwith, in the Parish of Bilton, in the County of the City of York.
Rodmarton and Coates (Gloucestershire) inclosure and determination of parish boundaries.	32 Geo. 3. c. 59 Pr.	11 June 1792
An Act for dividing and enclosing the Open and Common Fields, Common Meadows, Common Pastures, and other Commonable Lands and Waste Grounds, within the several Parishes of Rodmarton and Coates, in the County of Gloucester; and also for settling and ascertaining the Boundaries of the said Parishes.
Monk Sherborne Inclosure Act 1792	32 Geo. 3. c. 60 Pr.	11 June 1792
An Act for dividing, allotting, and enclosing the Open and Common Fields and Waste Lands within the Common Fields only, in the Parish of Monk Sherborne, in the County of Southampton.
Shipton Inclosure Act 1792	32 Geo. 3. c. 61 Pr.	11 June 1792
An Act for dividing, allotting, and enclosing the Open and Common Fields, Common Meadows, Common Downs, and other Commonable Lands and Grounds in the Parish of Shipton, in the County of Southampton.
Hemswell Inclosure Act 1792	32 Geo. 3. c. 62 Pr.	11 June 1792
An Act for dividing and enclosing the Open Fields, Meadows, Pastures, Commons, and Waste Lands within the Parish of Hemswell, in the County of Lincoln.
Lambley Inclosure Act 1792	32 Geo. 3. c. 63 Pr.	11 June 1792
An Act for dividing and enclosing the Open Fields, Coppices, Commons, and Waste Lands, within the Parish of Lambley, in the County of Nottingham.
Gedling Inclosure Act 1792	32 Geo. 3. c. 64 Pr.	11 June 1792
An Act for dividing and enclosing the Open and Enclosed Common Fields, Common Woods, Wastes, Commons, and other Lands, within the Parish of Gedling, comprizing the several Hamlets of Gedling, Stoke Bardolph, and Carlton, in the County of Nottingham.
Great and Little Weldon (Northamptonshire) Inclosure Act 1792	32 Geo. 3. c. 65 Pr.	11 June 1792
An Act for dividing and enclosing the Common and Open Fields, Meadows, Commonable Lands and Waste Grounds, in Great Weldon and Little Weldon, in the County of Northampton.
Southleigh Inclosure Act 1792	32 Geo. 3. c. 66 Pr.	11 June 1792
An Act for dividing and enclosing the Open Common Fields, Common Meadows, Common Pastures, Commons, Heaths, Waste, and other Commonable Lands or Grounds, within the Manor and Chapelry of Southleigh, in the Parish of Stanton Harcourt, in the County of Oxford.
Basford Inclosure Act 1792	32 Geo. 3. c. 67 Pr.	11 June 1792
An Act for dividing and enclosing the Open Fields, Meadows, Forest Commons, and Waste Lands, within the Parish of Basford, in the County of Nottingham.
Nutcombe's Name Act 1792	32 Geo. 3. c. 68 Pr.	11 June 1792
An Act to enable Nutcombe Quick of Nutcombe, in the County of Devon, Clerk, and his first and other Sons, and their Issue Male, and his Daughters and their Issue, to take and use the Surname of Nutcombe, according to the last Will and Testament of Hannah Nutcombe Bluett deceased.
Ventura's Naturalization Act 1792	32 Geo. 3. c. 69 Pr.	11 June 1792
An Act for naturalizing Joseph Ventura.
Naturalization of Anne Marie and James Mainwaring Act 1792	32 Geo. 3. c. 70 Pr.	11 June 1792
An Act for naturalizing Anne Marie Mainwaring and James Mainwaring.
Earl of Radnor's Estate Act 1792	32 Geo. 3. c. 71 Pr.	15 June 1792
An Act for vesting several Lands and Hereditaments of which Jacob Earl of Radnor is Tenant for Life, in Trustees to be sold, and for laying out the Money to arise therefrom, in the Purchase of other Lands and Hereditaments, to be settled to the like Uses, in Lieu thereof.
Shipton Oliffe, Shipton Sollars, Whittington and Dowdeswell (Gloucestershire) Inclosure Act 1792	32 Geo. 3. c. 72 Pr.	15 June 1792
An Act for dividing and enclosing the Open Common Fields, Common Meadows, and Pasture, Waste Grounds, Hills, Downs, and other Commonable and Waste Lands, within the several Manors of Lower otherwise Nether Hampen, Shipton Sollers, and Shipton Olliffe, in the Parishes of Shipton Sollers and Shipton Olliffe, in the County of Gloucester, and some Pieces of Land which extend into the Parishes of Whittington and Dowdeswell, in the same County.

=== Sources ===
- Pickering, Danby, ed. (1790). "Anno regni tricesimo secundo Georgii III". The Statutes at Large. Vol. 37. pp. 453–685 – via Google Books.
- Journals of the House of Commons. Vol. 47. London: His Majesty's Stationery Office. 1803. pp. 3–707 – via Google Books.
- Journal of the House of Lords. Vol. 39: 1790-1793. pp. 262–491 – via British History Online.
- Chronological Table of and Index to the Statutes. Vol. 1: To the End of the Session 59 Vict. Sess. 2 (1895) (13th ed.). London: Her Majesty's Stationery Office. 1896. pp. 151–152 – via Google Books.
- "Acts of the Parliament of Great Britain from 1792". legislation.gov.uk. The National Archives.

== See also ==
- List of acts of the Parliament of Great Britain
