= Duntulm =

Coordinates: 57.68°N 6.34°W

Duntulm: Scottish Gaelic: Dùn Thuilm
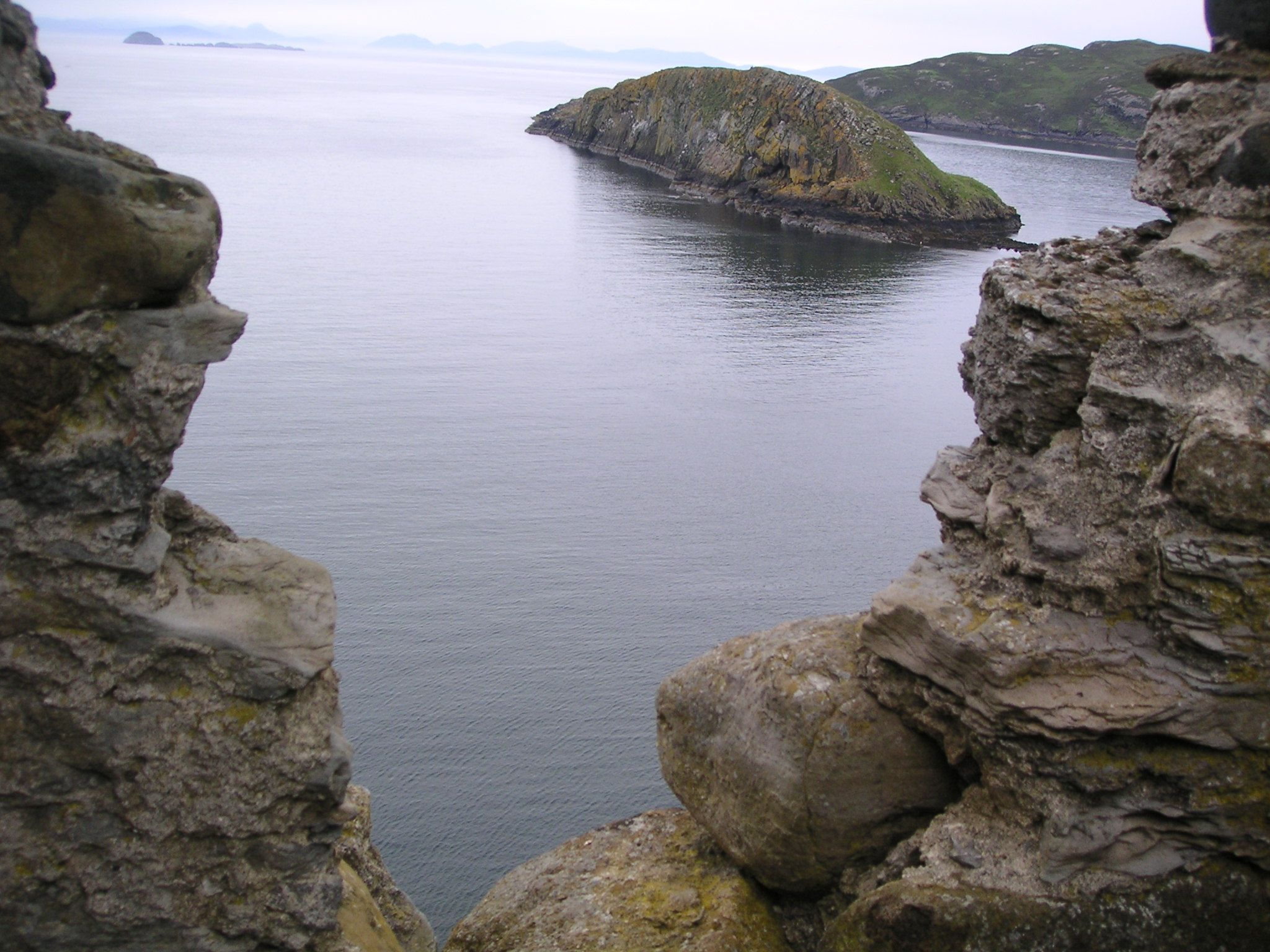
- Tulm Island seen from Duntulm Castle

- Location within the Isle of Skye
- OS grid reference: NG410739
- Council area: Highland
- Lieutenancy area: Ross and Cromarty
- Country: Scotland
- Sovereign state: United Kingdom
- Post town: PORTREE
- Postcode district: IV51
- Dialling code: 01470 552
- Police: Scotland
- Fire: Scottish
- Ambulance: Scottish
- UK Parliament: Inverness, Skye and West Ross-shire
- Scottish Parliament: Ross, Skye and Inverness West

Duntulm (Scottish Gaelic: Dùn Thuilm) is a township situated on the northwest coast of the Trotternish peninsula on the Isle of Skye, and is made up of Shulista (North Duntulm) and South Duntulm. It is located on the single-track A855 road about 24 miles (39 km) north of Portree. The township is noted for its long fortified headland, which the ruins of Duntulm Castle presently sit.

== Geography and natural history ==
Duntulm is coastally composed of a series of bays and onlooked by Cnoc Roll, a small hill standing 122 m above sea level with a radio mast. Duntulm Bay sits north of Duntulm Castle, and contains the 33 m high Tulm Island and smaller Port Duntulm. The bay is overlooked by the abandoned linear settlement of Erisco - depopulated during the highland clearances. Duntulm features a single small loch, Loch Cleat (meaning Grey Loch).

Immediately south of the castle is Cairidh Ghlumaig, a bay which forms part of the yair (Scottish Gaelic for fish trap) of Ghlumaig. Cairidh Ghlumaig is renowned for its outcrop of the type section of the Middle Jurassic aged Duntulm Formation (c. 170 million years old), which contains several trackways attributed to long-necked sauropods. The coast from Cairidh Ghlumaig to Score Bay is strictly protected by the Skye Nature Conservation Order 2019, which safeguards Skye's vertebrate fossils.

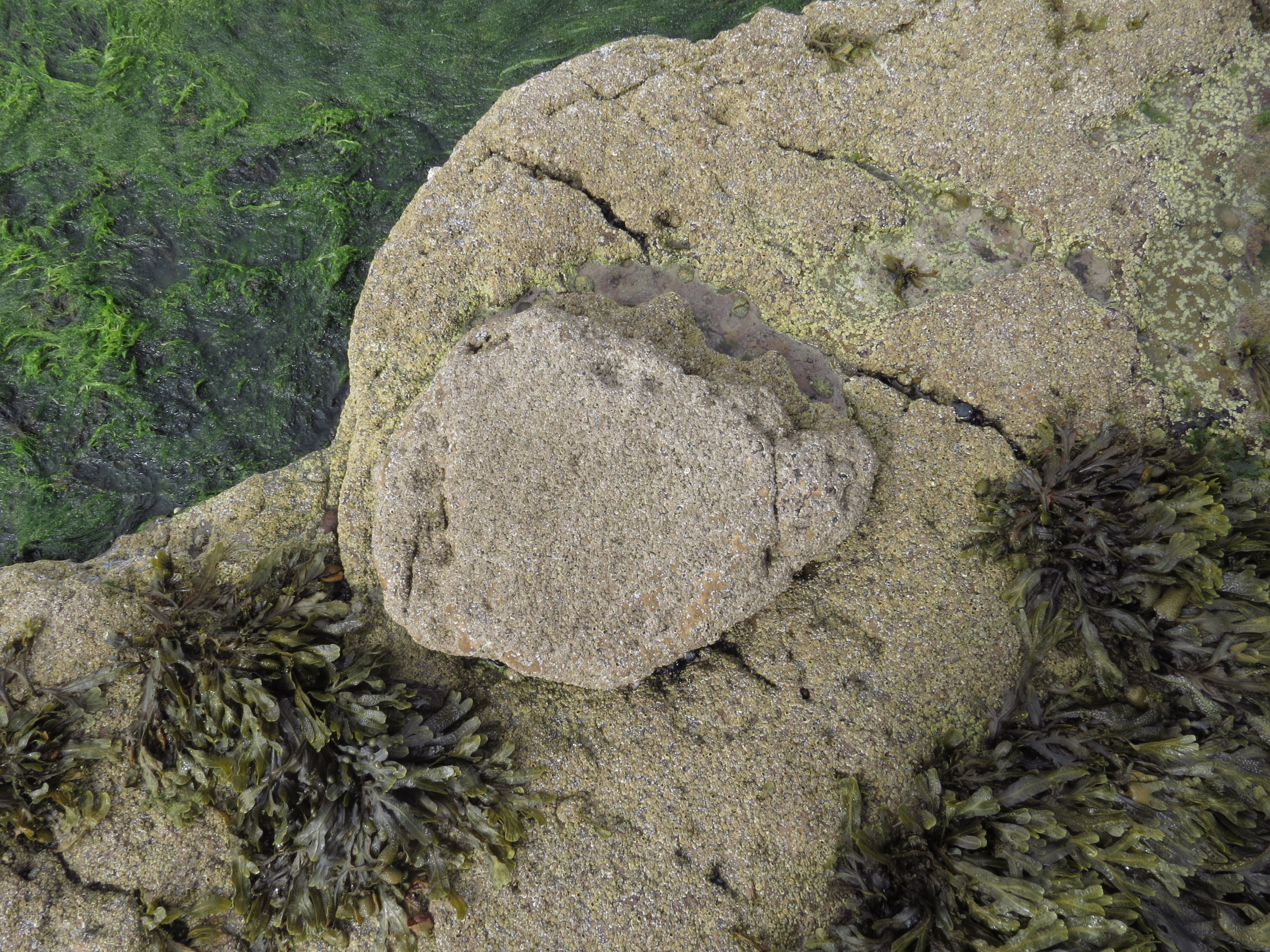
Positive relief sauropod footprint on a wave cut platform at Cairidh Ghlumaig (Duntulm).

== History ==
Duntulm was originally a Pictish fortress, forming one of a chain of duns or forts stretching along the north coast of the Isle of Skye. On the arrival of the Norsemen the fort became the residence of a powerful Viking leader who gave it the name David's Fort.

Trotternish often changed hands. It was not until the 16th century that the Lords of the Isles finally seized the territory and Donhall Gorm (Blue Donald) the chief (great-grandson of Hugh of Sleat), took up residence there and carried out considerable improvements to the fort. In 1730 the MacDonalds moved away from Duntulm and stayed for a time at Monkstadt before building their new castle at Armadale.

Duntulm is home to a clach-ultaich, a lifting stone believed to weigh a ton.
