= Glen Brittle =

Landform on the Isle of Skye, Scotland

Coordinates: 57.225°N 6.300°W

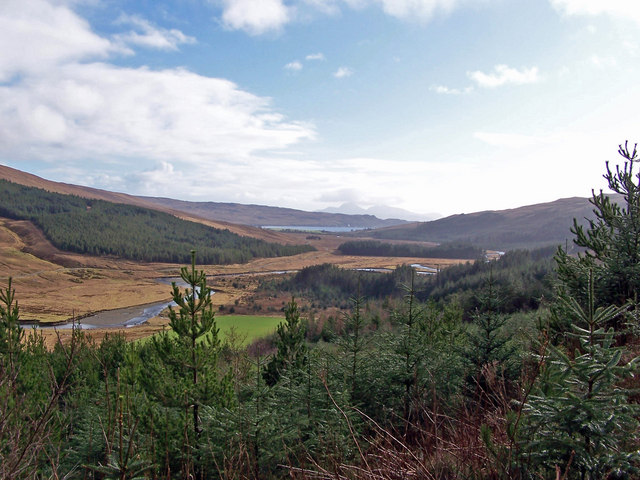
A view south from a track in Glen Brittle forest. The River Brittle meanders southwards through the glen towards its mouth in Loch Brittle. The island of Rum is visible in the distance.

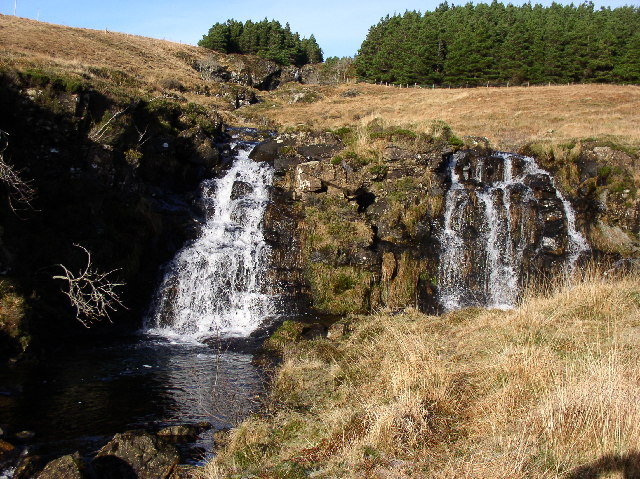
Waterfalls running into the River Brittle

Glen Brittle (Gleann Breadail in Scottish Gaelic) is a large glen in the south of the Isle of Skye, in Scotland. It runs roughly south to north, along the River Brittle, which has its mouth at Loch Brittle (a sea loch). The glen is bounded on the east by the main Black Cuillin ridge, the largest mountains on Skye. The name is probably derived from old Norse Bred Dal ("broad valley") with the Gaelic glean ("valley") being prefixed later.

Many tributaries of the Brittle run down from these mountains into the glen, including a stream with waterfalls known as the much-visited Fairy Pools. Because of its location by the peaks, the area is popular with hikers and mountain bikers. A single road runs through the glen on the east side of the river. On the slopes on the west side there are large sections of forest maintained by Forestry and Land Scotland. There are two hamlets in the south of the glen - Glenbrittle and Bualintur. Near the mouth of the River Brittle is the Glenbrittle Campsite and grocery shop near a sandy beach. The 1930s youth hostel, operated by Hostelling Scotland, is by the Allt a' Choire Ghreadaidh (a Brittle tributary) just north of Glenbrittle hamlet.

In the northern woods and fields red deer can be seen. Rabbits and swallows tend to be restricted to the farmland in the south. Ruddy turnstones, ringed plovers, grey herons, dunlins, curlews and oystercatchers can be found on the beach.

In 2024, forestry clearing operations in Glen Brittle uncovered the remains of a lost 17th- or 18th-century farming settlement known as Brunell. Once home to over 2000 people, it was abandoned in the 19th century due to the amalgamation of small farms.
