= Battle of Coire Na Creiche =

Scottish clan battle fought on the Isle of Skye in 1601

Coordinates: 57°14′54″N 6°15′10″W

Battle of Coire na Creiche
- Part of The Wars of the One-Eyed Woman
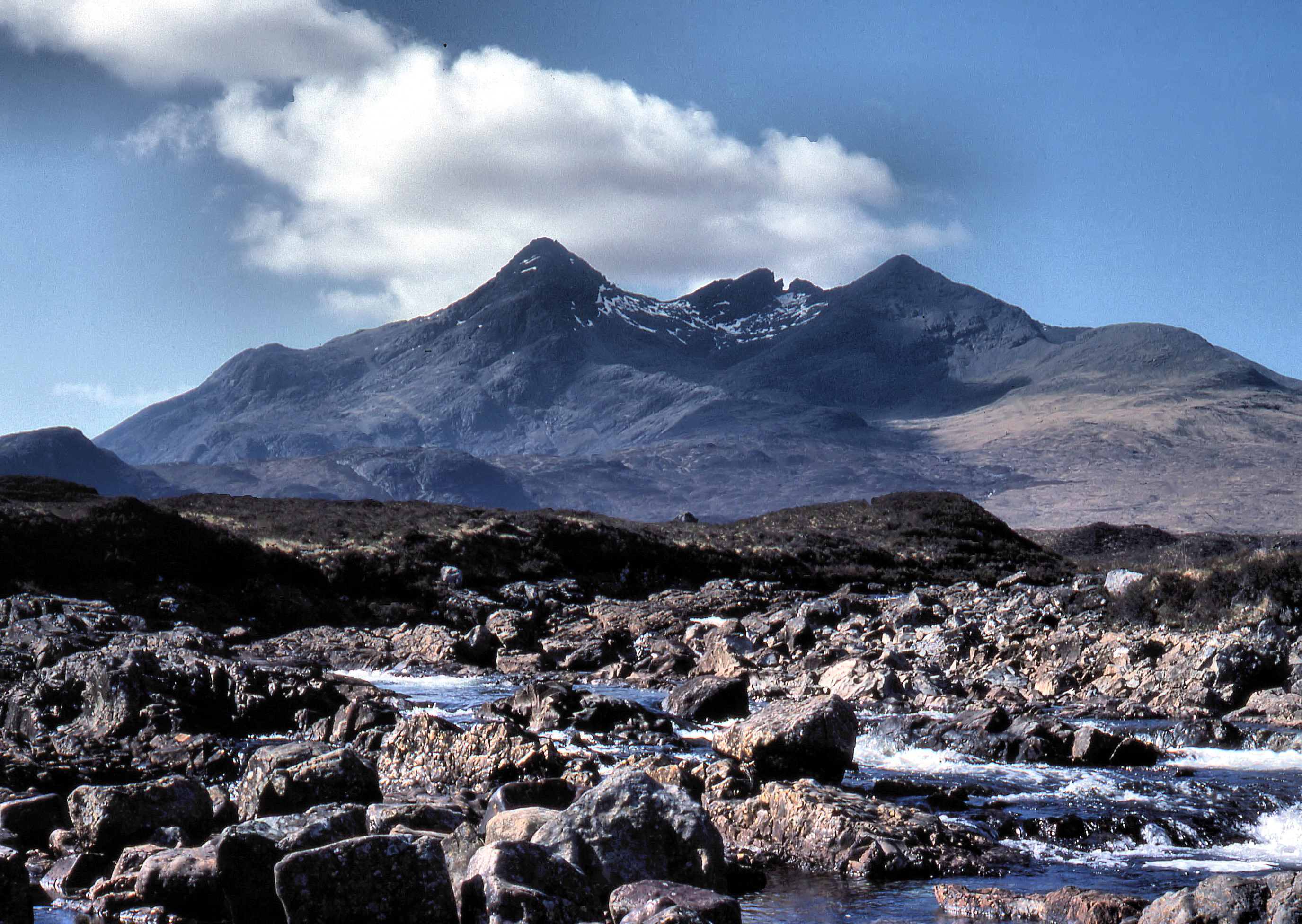
- Sgurr nan Gillean (left), Am Basteir and Bruach na Frithe (right), Coire na Creiche is round the corner to the right
Date	Summer 1601
Location	Cuillin hills, Skye grid reference NG4325
Result	MacDonald victory

Belligerents
Clan MacDonald of Sleat	Clan MacLeod

Commanders and leaders
Donald MacDonald	Alasdair MacLeod

Strength
Unknown	Unknown

Casualties and losses
Unknown	Unknown

The Battle of Coire na Creiche (Battle of Benquhillan) was a Scottish clan battle fought on the Isle of Skye in 1601. It was the culmination of a year of feuding between Clan MacLeod of Dunvegan and the Clan MacDonald of Sleat, that ended with a MacDonald victory in Coire na Creiche on the northern slopes of the Cuillin hills. It was the last clan battle in Skye.

== Background ==
The Macleod and MacDonald Clans had been long at feud. Rory Mòr MacLeod (Ruaraidh MacLeòid) attempted to make peace, offering the hand of his sister, Margaret Macleod, in marriage to Donald Gorm Mòr MacDonald (Dòmhnall Gorm Mòr MacDhòmhnall). The marriage itself was subject to a contract called a handfast. In a handfast arrangement, a man and woman lived together as husband and wife for up to a year and a day. If, during this period, the woman bore a male child to be heir, then marriage would result. If not, then both parties returned to their respective families.

After a year and a day, Margaret MacLeod had not borne a child, male or female. Furthermore, at some point during this year, she had lost the sight in one eye. Donald MacDonald, having no further use for Margaret MacLeod, decided to send her back to her brother. He tied her, facing backwards, onto a one-eyed horse, led by a one-eyed servant and followed by a one-eyed mongrel dog, and sent all four back to Dunvegan Castle. Rory MacLeod, incensed by the insult to his sister, and ultimately to himself and his clan, once again declared war on the clan MacDonald. He devastated the Trotternish peninsula in the north of Skye, which prompted MacDonald to attack MacLeod land in Harris. These battles became known as the Wars of the One-Eyed Woman.

== Carinish ==
MacLeod responded with a raid on North Uist, sending 40 men under his cousin Donald Glas MacLeod to seize goods that the locals had put for safety in the Trinity Temple at Carinish. As the raiders ate breakfast in the church, they were surprised by twelve MacDonalds led by Donald MacIain 'ic Sheumais (Donald, son of John, son of James) of Clan Ranald, who led the MacLeods into an ambush. Only two MacLeods survived the Battle of Carinish; Donald MacLeod was among the dead.

On his way back to Skye to report his victory, a storm forced Donald MacIain 'ic Sheumais to seek shelter at Rodel in Harris. He was entertained there by Rory MacLeod, even after Rory learned the identity of his guests. However the MacDonalds wisely left secretly during the night; before dawn, MacLeod clansmen set fire to their quarters without the knowledge of their chief.

== Final battle at Coire na Creiche ==
The feud continued to escalate, causing much suffering among the people. MacDonald decided to end it with a decisive battle. When Rory MacLeod went to seek the assistance of Archibald Campbell, 7th Earl of Argyll, MacDonald took the opportunity to launch an all-out invasion of northern Skye. The cattle seized in this attack were driven south to a traditional refuge for raiders, the Coire na Creiche (Scottish Gaelic: Corrie of the Foray) overlooking Glen Brittle below Bruach na Frìthe.

Here the MacLeod forces led by Rory's brother Alasdair caught up with the MacDonalds. They joined battle late in the day and continued well into the night. The MacLeods were utterly defeated, with the capture of Alasdair MacLeod and 30 of his kinsmen.

== Aftermath ==
The Privy Council now intervened to end the feud. MacDonald was ordered to surrender himself to George Gordon, 1st Marquess of Huntly, and Rory MacLeod was to surrender to the Earl of Argyll. MacDonald agreed to release his prisoners, and the end of the feud was celebrated with three weeks of feasting and festivities at Dunvegan Castle. Aside from a brief flare-up in 1603, that was the end of violence between the two clans.

== In popular culture ==
The events are the subject of a comic folk song by Glasgow folk singer Matt McGinn. The song is called The One-Eyed Woman.

Also referenced in Season 1, Episode 3 of the Amazon series Good Omens.

== Bibliography ==
- Roberts, John Leonard (1999), Feuds, Forays and Rebellions: History of the Highland Clans, 1475-1625, Edinburgh University Press, pp. 140–1, ISBN 978-0-7486-6244-9 Seems largely based on the account in Conflicts of the Clans.
