= Fairy Pools =

Natural waterfall phenomenon in Glen Brittle

Coordinates: 57.25°N 6.2565°W

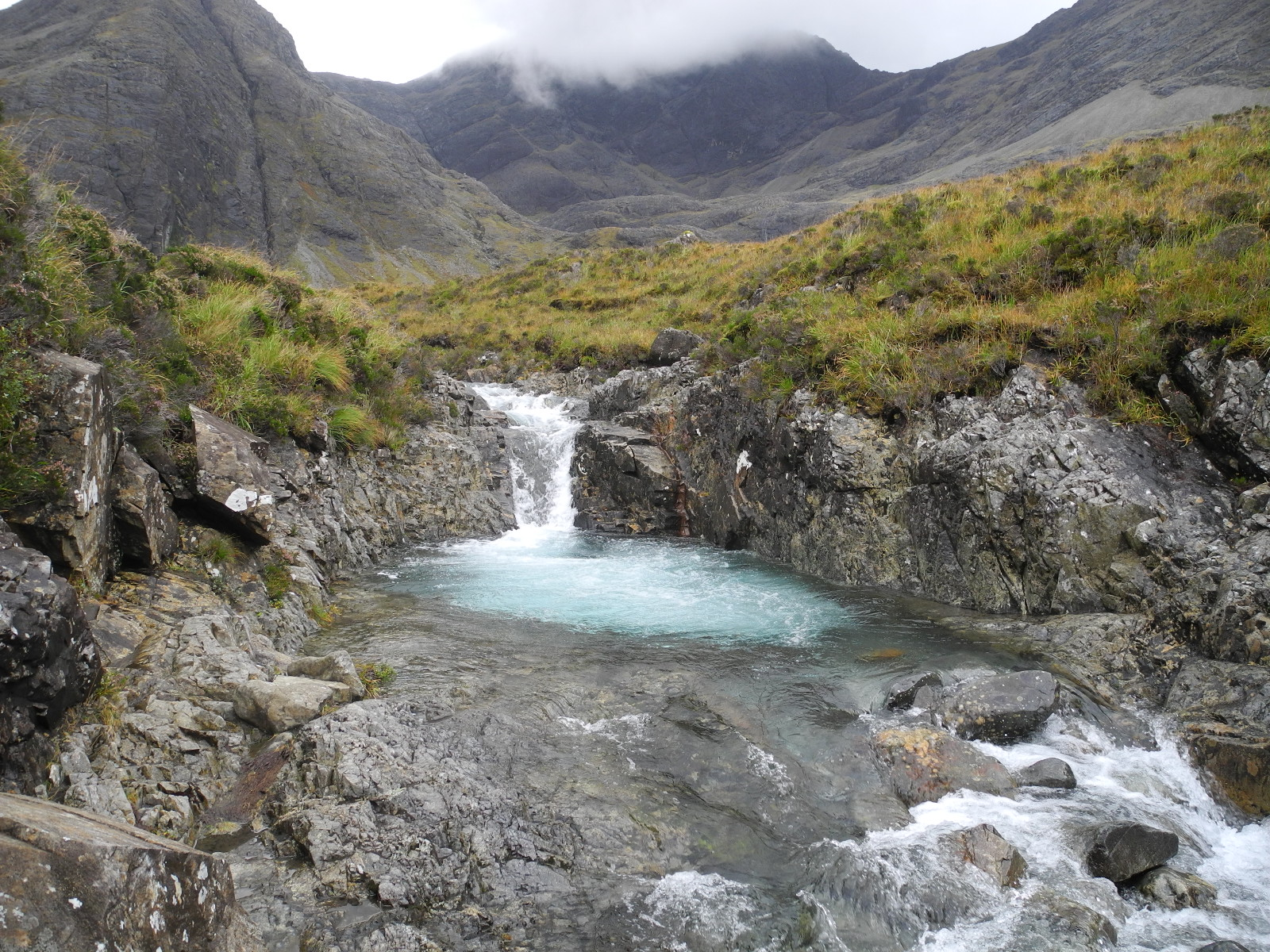
The highest of the fairy pools

The Fairy Pools (Scottish Gaelic: Glumagan nan Sithichean) are a series of natural pools and waterfalls in Glen Brittle on the Isle of Skye, Scotland. They are in Coire na Creiche ("corrie of the spoils"), on the Allt Coir' a' Mhadaidh ("burn of the corrie of the wolf/dog"), at the foot of the Cuillin mountains. The pools are a vivid aqua blue and are a popular place for wild swimmers who brave the frigid waters.

The habitat of the Fairy Pools hosts a variety of animals, such as red deer, rabbits, and sheep. The area is also host to a large number of birds. Large flocks of crows, ravens, and gulls are present in the area, as well as such smaller birds as meadow pipits, turnstones, common ringed plovers, grey herons, dunlins, and curlews. The landscape is mostly rocky, with some boggy areas here and there. The water in the area is typically cold, as the pools are fed by mountain streams.

Although they were initially unnamed and virtually unrecognised as a tourist attraction, the popularity of the Fairy Pools as a walking destination surged starting in the 2000s. Visitor numbers in 2006 were 13,000, increasing to 82,000 by 2015 and more than doubling to 180,000 by 2019. It is about a 20-minute walk to the Fairy Pools from the Glen Brittle car park.

The first known reference to the location as 'the Fairy Pools' is in a 1931 guide book. There are no known associations with fairies.

The Battle of Coire Na Creiche was fought in the area in 1601.

== Internet hoax ==
In 2013 an internet hoax circulated suggesting the Fairy Pools had sprouted vivid purple flora. The images circulated were actually of the Shotover River in New Zealand.
