= Loch Brittle =

Bay on the Isle of Skye, Scotland

Coordinates: 57.193°N 6.297°W

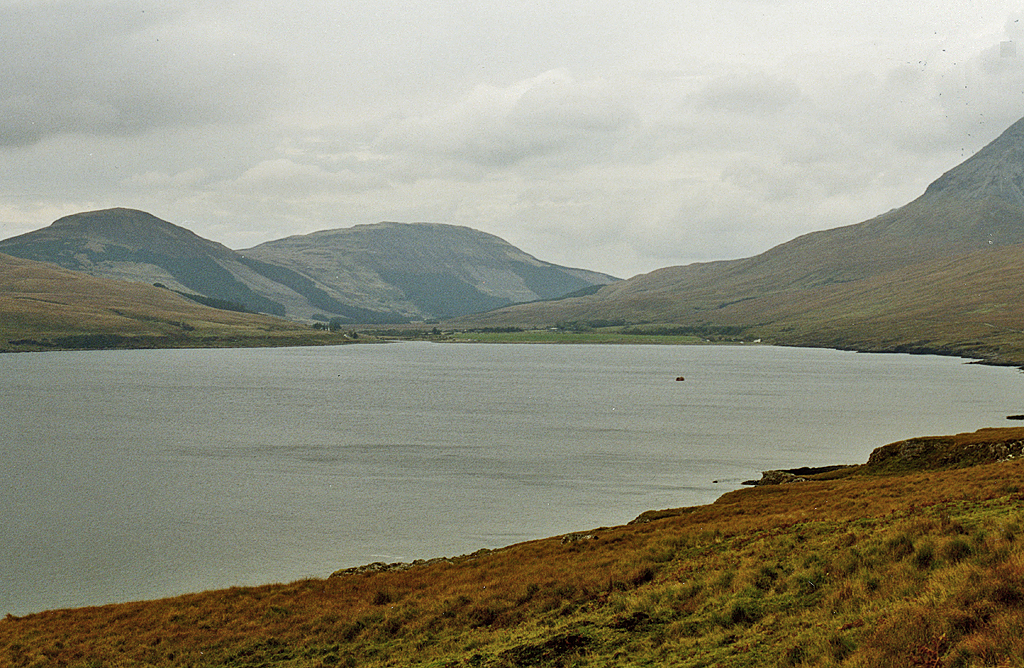
Loch Brittle towards Glen Brittle

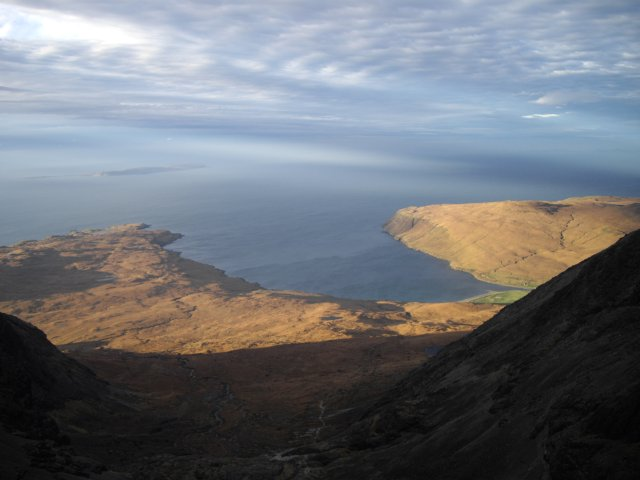
Loch Brittle from the Cuillin ridge

Loch Brittle is a sea loch on the southwest coast of Skye in Scotland.

A volcanic dark sandy beach separates Glen Brittle from Loch Brittle. The land to the sides of the loch contains the hills of Beinn an Eoin and Ceanne na Beinne and the point of Rubh' an Dunain.

There are some sea caves. Otters, seals and porpoises are sometimes found in the loch.
