= Askernish =

Coordinates: 57.187°N 7.391°W

Askernish: Scottish Gaelic: Àisgearnais
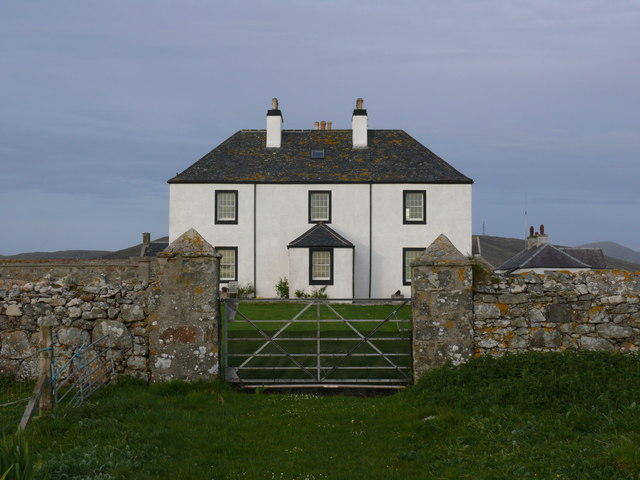
- Askernish House

- Location within the Outer Hebrides
- Language: Scottish Gaelic; English
- OS grid reference: NF743235
- Civil parish: South Uist
- Council area: Na h-Eileanan Siar
- Lieutenancy area: Western Isles
- Country: Scotland
- Sovereign state: United Kingdom
- Post town: ISLE OF SOUTH UIST
- Postcode district: HS8
- Dialling code: 01878
- Police: Scotland
- Fire: Scottish
- Ambulance: Scottish
- UK Parliament: Na h-Eileanan an Iar
- Scottish Parliament: Na h-Eileanan an Iar

Askernish (Scottish Gaelic: Àisgearnais, Aisgernis) is a crofting community on South Uist, in the Outer Hebrides, Scotland. Askernish is in the parish of South Uist, and is situated on the A865 north of Daliburgh. The Askernish golf course, designed by Old Tom Morris, is located on the coast and has a view of the beach.
