= Hugh of Sleat =

Scottish noble (1436–1498)

Hugh of Sleat (c. 1436 – 1498), pronounced "Slate", who is known as Ùisdean (Scottish Gaelic pronunciation: [ˈuːʃtʲan]) in Gaelic, was a son of Alexander MacDonald, 10th Earl of Ross and Lord of the Isles. He was a member of the Highland and Western Isles Clan Donald. Hugh's clan later became known as Clan Uisdean, Clan Donald North, and Clan Macdonald of Sleat, while the McDonnells of County Antrim in Northern Ireland were known as Clan Donald South.

Hugh was probably born about 1436, the year when his father is said to have married his mother via handfast marriage. She was a daughter of Gillepatrick Roy, son of Rory, son of the Green Abbot of Applecross, of the O'Bealon family, former Earls of Ross. The O'Bealon family also has been known as Ross and Rose and has connections to the Leslie family through marriage. Hugh's mother was said to be a great beauty.

Hugh was probably born in Dingwall Castle, just outside Inverness, Scotland, the same castle where Macbeth of Scotland, of Shakespeare fame, was born. This was long the seat of the Earls of Ross. He most likely died at Paisley Abbey, in Paisley, Scotland, in 1498, and was buried at a place called Sand, on the island of North Uist. This burial ground is now called Clachan Shannda, Clachan meaning "a small village with a church", and Shannda meaning "Sand" or "Sand Island", from the Norse.

John, last Lord of the Isles from the McDonald line, was the half brother of Hugh and received the lordship in 1449, when Alexander died at Dingwall. There is some controversy over the exact date, but it appears that John confirmed in Hugh a charter to the lands of Sleat on the Isle of Skye, off the western coast of Scotland, during the year 1449. These could have been lands Hugh's father, Alexander, promised to him. John would then have been about fifteen years old, so would have needed the blessing of his council. Hugh was the youngest of Alexander of Islay's sons, and probably thirteen years old when he first became Hugh of Sleat.

Sleat is pronounced "slate", and this is shown by an old saying within the McDonald clan, that "In the house of McDonald, the Sleats are on top." This is a humorous comparison of roof slates to the family of Sleat, which still leads Clan Donald to this very day.

Some historians say Hugh did not become "of Sleat" until 1469, however he witnessed a charter for John in 1461, disproving this claim. Hugh received a royal confirmation, by proclamation, of his Sleat lands, in 1476, and a written confirmation from the King of Scotland in 1495.

There is an interesting story concerning Hugh and the Earl of the Orkney islands, off the north coast of Scotland. While Hugh was still less than thirteen, his father, Alexander, was carousing with the Earl of Orkney, and well into the night, the Earl invited Alexander to breakfast in the morning. Alexander boasted that he would have breakfast ready first.

The two men finally retired, however not before the Earl had sent twelve men out to make sure no one sold firewood or meat to the MacDonald men. However, one of Alexander's loyal followers secured some wood for the fire and a deer for a venison breakfast. When the Earl received his early-morning invitation for breakfast, he was furious. He growled, "Do you think to equal or cope with me in power and authority?" Alexander explained that he had a young son at home, Hugh, who could in fact equal the Earl in power and would someday prove it. Hugh went to the Orkney Islands to attack the Earl several years later, in 1460. Alexander was probably trying to insult the Earl by saying his young son, still a minor, could match the Earl in "power and authority". It just took a while for Hugh to become old enough to fulfill the threat.

Hugh had six sons by six different women. It was after the Orkney incident that Hugh "got a son by the daughter of Gunn" in Caithness – this being Donald Gallach (his name meaning "of Caithness"). Donald was Hugh's second son. Hugh's first son, John, died without issue. A family named Harris also descends from Hugh, through his son Donald of Harri. Hugh also had at least one daughter.

== Descendants ==
All of Hugh's sons died violent deaths in the contest over the Chieftainship of Clan MacDonald of Sleat. However, his line has carried down through Clan Donald to the present day. The present chief of Clan Donald, Godfrey James Macdonald of Macdonald, and the present chief of Clan Macdonald of Sleat, Sir Ian Godfrey Bosville Macdonald of Sleat, are both descendants of Hugh. The chief of the Macdonalds of Sleat bears the Gaelic patronymic MacÙisdein (MacHugh), a reference to Hugh.

Donald Gallach's son, Alexander, took the names of Hugh to Ireland, in 1565, to fight for his first cousin, Sorley Boy McDonnell, leader of Clan Donald South.

Hugh's Sleat land remained in the hands of his descendants the MacDonalds of Sleat until 1971, approximately 522 years. The Clan Donald Center on Skye still stands on Sleat land.
