= Rudston Roman villa =

Romano-British building in England

Coordinates: 54.084787°N 0.33613497°W

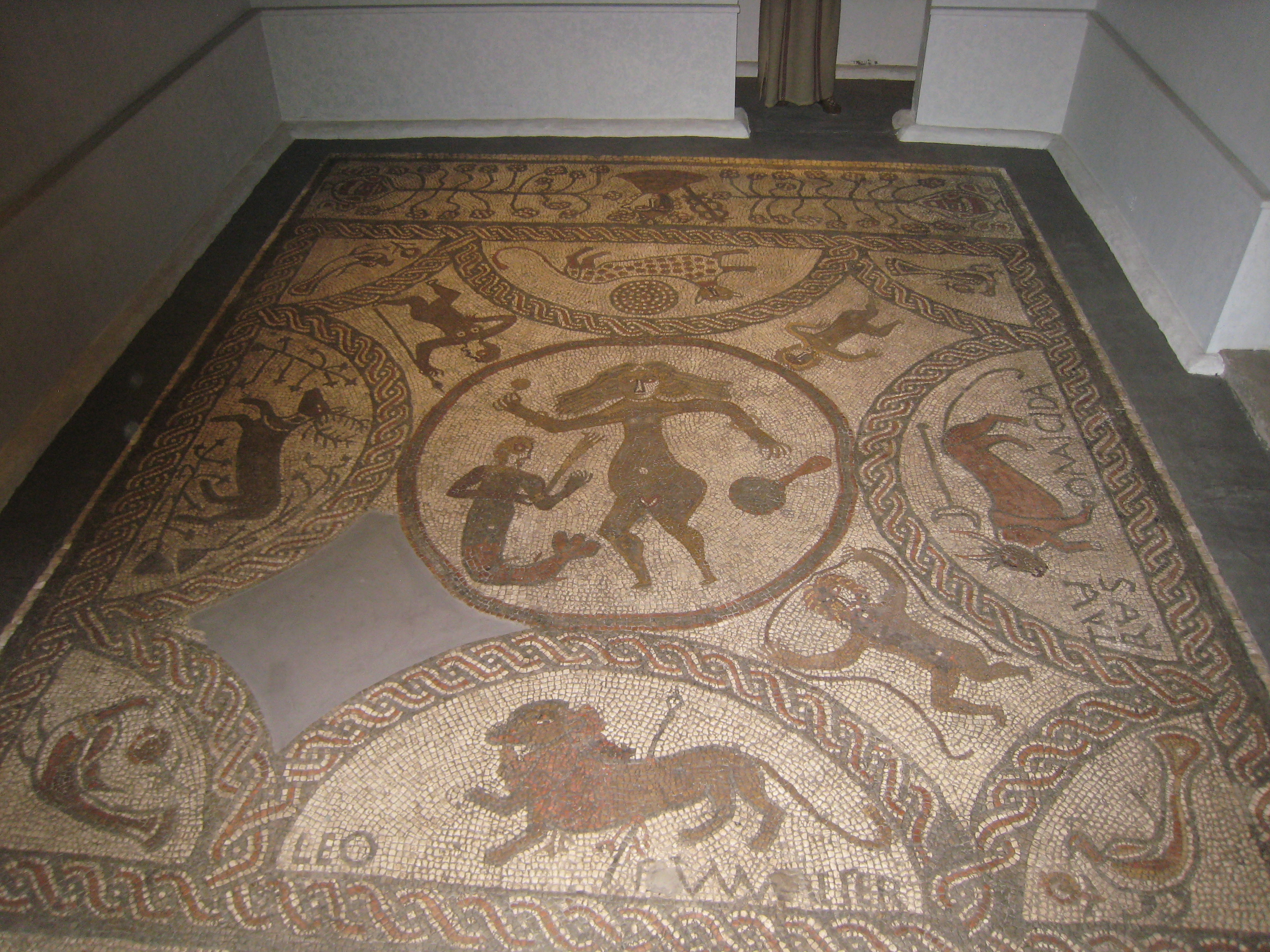
- The Rudston Venus mosaic

- Location within East Riding of Yorkshire

General information
- Architectural style: Romano-British Villa
- Location: Rudston, East Riding of Yorkshire, England, United Kingdom
- Construction started: c.3rd century

Rudston Roman villa is a Romano-British villa and scheduled monument near Rudston, East Riding of Yorkshire, England.

== Villa ==
The site was first discovered in 1838 by farm worker. In 1933 the 'Venus mosaic' was discovered by the landowner and farmer H. Robson whilst ploughing.

The primary phase of the villa dates to the 3rd–4th centuries AD. It is a courtyard villa, with mosaics and a small bath house on the east side. The site has some evidence for a 1st–2nd century AD rectangular enclosure and an earlier Iron Age settlement beneath it.

The site is listed on the heritage at risk register as having 'extensive significant problems' and is vulnerable from plough damage.

=== Mosaics ===
H. Robson retained the mosaics he discovered in the ground, and built a shed over them to display them to the public. By the 1960s frost damage was causing the mosaics to deteriorate and they were transferred to the Hull and East Riding Museum where they have been on display since 1963. The 'Charioteer mosaic' was found in excavations in 1971; it depicts a quadriga and dates to the 4th century AD.
