= Menhir de Champ-Dolent =

Upright standing stone by Dol-de-Bretagne, France

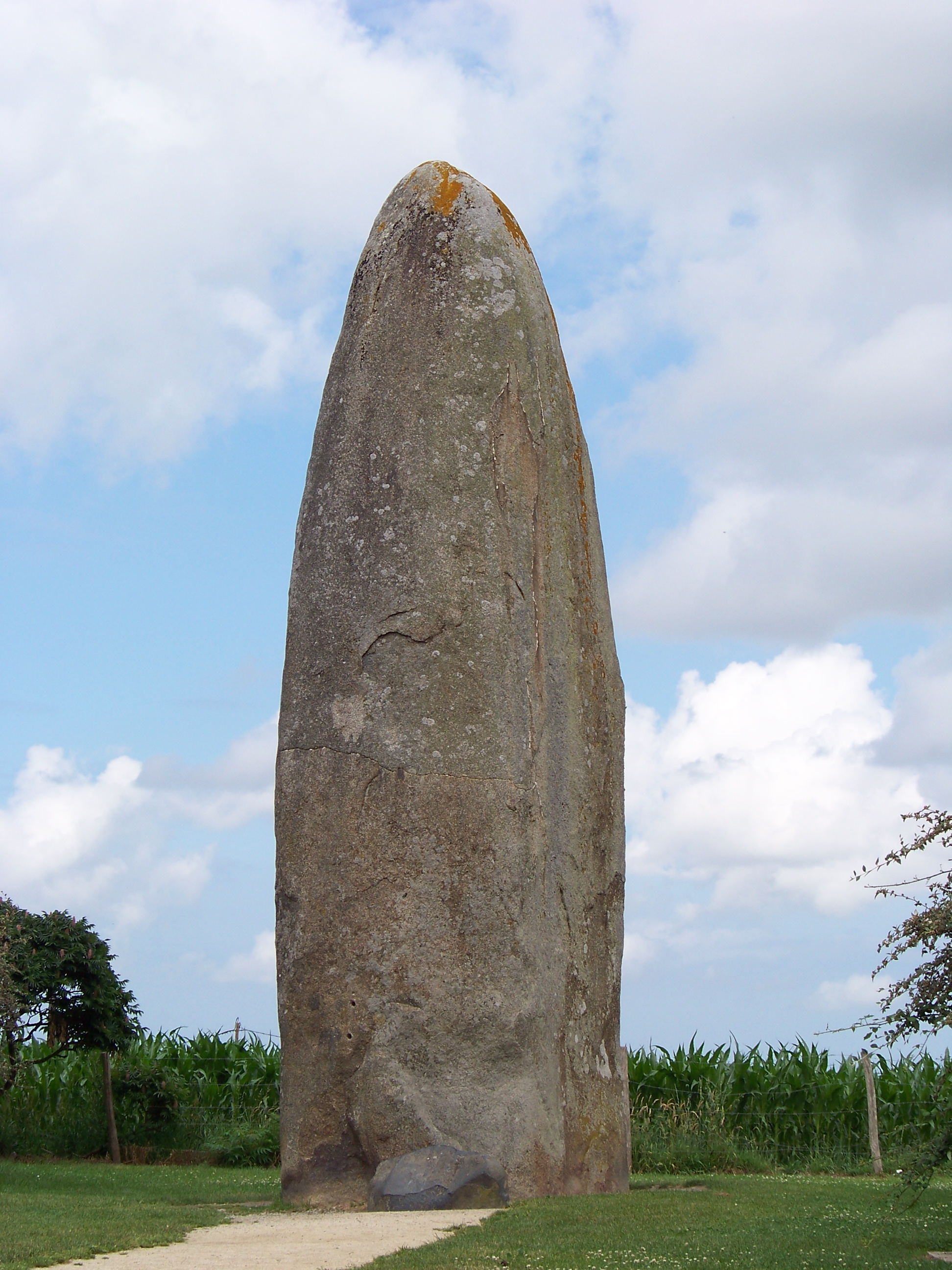

- Location in Brittany, France

General information
- Location: Dol-de-Bretagne, Brittany, France
- Coordinates: 48.5350°N 1.73917°W
- Years built: c. 4500 BC

Height
- Height: c. 9.4 meters

Technical details
- Material: Granite

The Menhir de Champ-Dolent (French: [meniʁ də ʃɑ̃ dɔlɑ̃]; Breton: Maen-hir dolenn) is a menhir, or upright standing stone, located in a field outside the town of Dol-de-Bretagne. It is the second largest standing stone in Brittany and is around 9.4 metres high.

== Location ==
The Menhir de Champ-Dolent is 2 kilometres (1 mile) south of Dol-de-Bretagne in the department of Ille-et-Vilaine. It is in a small picnic area fenced off among the fields near the D795 road.

== Description ==
The menhir is the second tallest of Brittany's standing stones. Its height above ground is between 9.3 and 9.5 metres (about 31 feet). It is made of pinkish granite, quarried about 2.5 mi (4.0 km) away, and has an estimated weight of around 100 tonnes. It is oval in shape with a smooth surface. A cross was once placed on top to Christianize it. It is not precisely dated, but recent scholarship suggests that Brittany's menhirs were erected c. 5000–4000 BC.

It has been registered as a monument historique by the French Ministry of Culture since 1889.

== In folklore ==
According to legend, the menhir rose from the ground to separate two feuding brothers who were on the point of killing each other. This legend is said to account for the name "Champ Dolent" which means "Field of Sorrow". In reality, the word dolent is more likely to derive from Breton dolenn ("meadow").

Another legend states that the menhir is slowly sinking into the ground, and the world will end when it disappears altogether.

According to tradition, in the year 560, Chlothar I, King of the Franks, is said to have met his rebel son, Chram, here.

== See also ==
- Broken menhir of er grah
- Rudston Monolith
