= Starting engine =

Starting engine (name differs depending on the type) - element of the propulsion system of a rocket, an aircraft, a missile or an ammunition using the reactive principle of motion (hereinafter referred to as a "rocket"), intended to bring the rocket into motion from the ready-to-launch state, giving it the necessary acceleration and acceleration to the required speed, together with other starting engines (if there are several), the shell of the hull and the emplaced airplane (if any), and other structural elements, depending on the type, class and model of the rocket, forms the launching stage of the rocket (in the event that the rocket is not a single-stage missile - an item with elements not separated in flight).

== Species ==
=== Punching filling ===
The name punching filling is used in connection with various unguided artillery, engineering and special ammunition, as well as other types of weapons that do not provide for their further guidance or homing after the production of a shot or triggering of the initiating mechanism.

=== Eject motor ===
The name eject motor is used with reference to tactical (SAM, ATGM) and strategic (ICBM, SLBM) guided missile armament.

=== Booster ===
The name booster is used for multi-stage missiles, as well as for aircraft with jet, turboprop and piston engines, using an accelerator for launching in the presence of cargo exceeding the maximum take-off weight on board. The accelerator is an optional, usually (but not always) disposable and dropping reactive device.

== See also ==
- Accelerant
- Starter (engine)
