= Frost damage =

Frost damage may refer to:

- Frost damage (construction), damage to constructions caused by the freezing of the moisture in the materials.
- Frost damage (biology), which is damage to plants and fruits caused by frost.
