= Rudston =

Village and civil parish in the East Riding of Yorkshire, England

Coordinates: 54.093358°N 0.325471°W

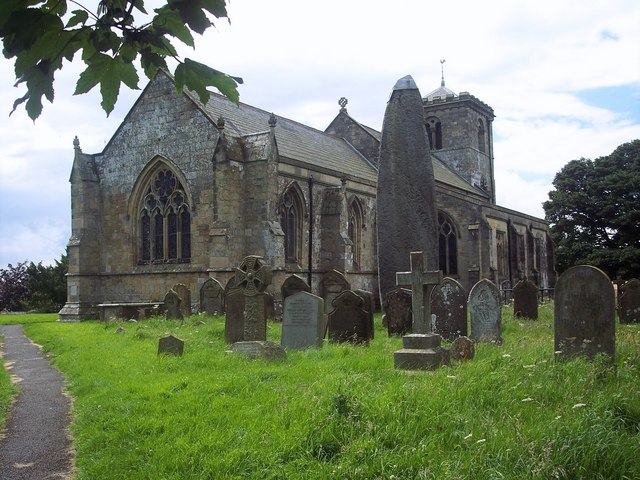
- All Saints' Church, Rudston

- Location within the East Riding of Yorkshire
- Population: 409 (2011 census)
- OS grid reference: TA096676
- Civil parish: Rudston
- Unitary authority: East Riding of Yorkshire
- Ceremonial county: East Riding of Yorkshire
- Region: Yorkshire and the Humber
- Country: England
- Sovereign state: United Kingdom
- Post town: DRIFFIELD
- Postcode district: YO25
- Dialling code: 01262
- Police: Humberside
- Fire: Humberside
- Ambulance: Yorkshire
- UK Parliament: Bridlington and The Wolds

Rudston is a small village and civil parish in the East Riding of Yorkshire, England. It is situated between Driffield and Bridlington approximately 6 miles (10 kilometres) west of Bridlington, and lies on the B1253 road. The Gypsey Race (an intermittent stream) runs through the village, which lies in the Great Wold Valley. There are a number of Neolithic sites associated with the stream and its valley. It is the current Seat of the Clan Macdonald of Sleat, the head of the family, Godfrey Macdonald, 8th Baron Macdonald, residing at Thorpe Hall.

According to the 2011 UK census, Rudston parish had a population of 409, an increase on the 2001 UK census figure of 390.

From the medieval era until the 19th century Rudston was part of Dickering Wapentake. Between 1894 and 1974 Rudston was a part of the Bridlington Rural District, in the East Riding of Yorkshire. From 1974 it was part of the Borough of North Wolds (later Borough of East Yorkshire), in the county of Humberside until the East Riding was re-established in 1996.

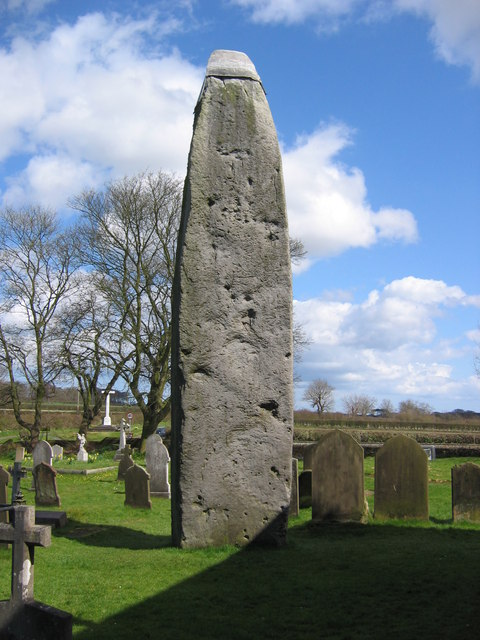
Rudston Monolith, almost 26 ft (8 m) high, close to Rudston Parish Church of All Saints. It is made from Moor Grit Conglomerate from the Late Neolithic Period, a material that can be found in the Cleveland Hills inland from Whitby.

== History ==
The place-name 'Rudston' is first attested in the Domesday Book of 1086, and means 'rood' or 'cross' stone, referring to the monolith. The name 'rud' derives from Old Norse ruð, meaning a clearing or pasture. So the place name could be stone in the clearing, Ruðstane.

== Ancient remains ==
The Rudston Monolith stands in the parish churchyard. At over 25 feet (7.5 metres) tall, it is the tallest standing stone in England, and gave the village its name; it is Grade I listed.

Southside Mount round barrow is situated to the south west of the village close to Woldgate reservoir.

Rudston is the centre of an unparalleled grouping of four Neolithic cursus monuments: cursus A, cursus B, cursus C and cursus D. At least one end of each cursus rests on an elevated chalk ridge on the sides of the Great Wold Valley. Cursuses A and C cross the Gypsey Race, whilst the other ends of cursuses B and D probably lie under the village.

Rudston Roman villa, noted for its mosaics, was first excavated in 1839. It was subsequently re-excavated in the 1930s, 1960s and 1970s. The mosaics are now in the Hull and East Riding Museum.

== Parish church ==
Rudston Grade I listed Anglican parish church is dedicated to All Saints. Of 14th-century origin, it was restored in 1861 by George Fowler Jones. It contains the gigantic organ, originally of four manuals, given by Sir Alexander McDonald of the Isles. Now a two-manual instrument, it stands at the west end of the church in the original case. The author Winifred Holtby is buried in the church graveyard. Since September 2014, the North Aisle of the church has a small heritage area including a 3D map of the village with sites of interest noted and a set of information boards about the history of the village.

Thorpe Hall to the east of the village was designated a Grade II* listed building in 1952 and is now recorded in the National Heritage List for England, maintained by Historic England. William Bosville (d.1813) was the last of his family to own it, and he bequeathed it to his nephew Godfrey Macdonald, 3rd Baron Macdonald of Sleat (1775–1832), whose descendants own it today.

== See also ==
- Listed buildings in Rudston
