= Listed buildings in Rudston =

Rudston is a civil parish in the county of the East Riding of Yorkshire, England. It contains 15 listed buildings that are recorded in the National Heritage List for England. Of these, three are listed at Grade I, the highest of the three grades, one is at Grade II*, the middle grade, and the others are at Grade II, the lowest grade. The parish contains the village of Rudston and the surrounding countryside. One of the listed buildings is the country house Thorpe Hall, and most of the listed buildings in the parish are structures associated with it. The others include the largest standing stone in Britain, a church, a house, a farmhouse and a war memorial.

== Key ==
| Grade | Criteria |
|---|---|
| I | Buildings of exceptional interest, sometimes considered to be internationally important |
| II* | Particularly important buildings of more than special interest |
| II | Buildings of national importance and special interest |

== Buildings ==
| Name and location | Photograph | Date | Notes | Grade |
|---|---|---|---|---|
| Rudston Monolith; 54.09391°N 0.32258°W | | Bronze Age (probable) | The monolith stands in the churchyard of All Saint's Church to the north of the church. It is the largest standing stone in Britain, measuring 25 feet (7.6 m) in height, and 6 feet (1.8 m) in width. The stone has a rectangular plan, widening towards the mid-point before tapering to a point. | I |
| All Saints' Church; 54.09378°N 0.32295°W | | 12th century | The church has been altered and extended during the centuries, including a restoration and alterations by G. Fowler Jones in 1861. It is built in stone with slate roofs, and consists of a nave, north and south aisles, a south porch, a chancel and a west tower. The tower is mainly Norman, it is unbuttressed, and has three stages, lancet windows, a sill band, clock faces, two-light bell openings in round-headed recesses with pierced circles in the tympana, a corbel table, an embattled parapet, and a pyramidal roof. | I |
| Buttercup Cottage; 54.09042°N 0.32761°W | — | 17th century | A small house divided into two cottages, in chalk with brick patching, and a pantile roof. There is one storey and attics, and two bays. On the front are two doorways and horizontally sliding sash windows with shutters. Above are two sloping roof dormers with casements. | II |
| Thorpe Hall; 54.09306°N 0.30540°W | — | Late 17th century | A country house that has been extended, in stuccoed and roughcast brick, with stone dressings and hipped slate roofs. The main block has three storeys and five bays, a chamfered plinth, and quoins, and has flanking wings. The middle bay projects under a semicircular pediment with scrolls and a shell motif. It contains a Tuscan portico with round-headed side windows in architraves, a keystone, a moulded cornice and a coped parapet. The doorway has pilasters with moulded capitals, a round-headed fanlight and a keystone. The windows are sashes, on the lower two floors with moulded cornices, and on the top floor with wedge lintels and iron railings. | II* |
| Littlethorpe Farmhouse; 54.11043°N 0.31596°W | — | Mid-18th century | The farmhouse is in red and grey brick, with a dentilled eaves cornice and a pantile roof. There are two storeys and attics, and four bays, the left bay later and gabled. On the front is a doorway, and the windows are sashes under segmental brick arches. | II |
| Ice house, Thorpe Hall; 54.09377°N 0.30445°W | — | 18th century | The ice house, in the grounds to the north of the house, is in brick with stone dressings. It is a domical structure about 4 metres (13 ft) in diameter, and is covered in soil. The porch has a round-headed doorway with a low coped parapet, leading to an earth-covered tunnel. | II |
| Bridge southwest of Thorpe Hall; 54.09014°N 0.31024°W | — | Late 18th century | The bridge, which crosses Gypsey Race, is in brick with stone dressings, and consists of a single elliptical arch. It has a chamfered hood mould, and square coped abutments to a coped parapet. | II |
| Stable block, Thorpe Hall; 54.09195°N 0.30761°W | — | Late 18th century | The stable block is in red brick, with a dentilled timber eaves cornice and a hipped slate roof. There are two storeys and 13 bays, the middle two bays projecting under a low pediment. This contains carriage entrances under a segmental brick arch with a keystone, flanked by sash windows under shallow segmental gauged brick arches. The outer wings contain doorways and sash windows with segmental gauged brick arches, and all the openings are in moulded architraves. | II |
| Billiard Room, Thorpe Hall; 54.09297°N 0.30435°W | — | 1821 | The billiard room is in roughcast brick, with stone dressings, a moulded cornice, and a low coped parapet. There is one storey and three bays, the bays divided by broad pilasters. On the sides are French windows with fanlights containing radial glazing. | II |
| Dairy, Thorpe Hall; 54.09330°N 0.30657°W | — | 1821 | The diary is in stuccoed brick, on a chamfered plinth, with a timber eaves cornice, and a slate roof. There is an octagonal plan, with two long sides and a verandah. The round-headed doorway has a fanlight, and the windows are round-headed with Y-tracery. The verandah is carried on cast iron columns with moulded caps and bases. The interior is completely tiled with coloured glazed tiles, and the windows are painted with female figures and geometrical designs. | I |
| Orangery, Thorpe Hall; 54.09297°N 0.30419°W | — | 1821 | The orangery is in stuccoed brick, with stone dressings, a Greek key frieze, a low coped parapet, and a hipped roof. There is a single storey and three bays. It contains French windows under fanlights with radial glazing, in moulded architraves, in round-headed recesses, with moulded imposts and hood moulds. | II |
| Bridge southeast of the stable block, Thorpe Hall; 54.09159°N 0.30702°W | — | 19th century | The bridge, which crosses Gypsey Race, is in brick, with stone dressings faced with stone. It consists of three segmental arches, the middle arch wider. The bridge has a band at deck level, and a coped parapet with splays. | II |
| Game larder, Thorpe Hall; 54.09274°N 0.30624°W | — | Late 19th century | The game larder is timber framed, with a swept octagonal pyramidal slate roof. It has an octagonal plan, with an internal octagonal larder. It contains a pointed doorway, and pointed windows with Y-tracery. On the roof is a louvred lantern. | II |
| Statue of Bacchus and Ariadne, Thorpe Hall; 54.09278°N 0.30541°W | — | 1903 | The statue is in the garden to the south of the house. It is in terracotta, and has a square plinth on a moulded base, with sunk moulded panels on the sides and a moulded cornice. The statue depicts a pair of figures in draperies walking with their arms entwined. | II |
| War memorial 54.09422°N 0.32159°W | | 1919 | The war memorial stands to the north of Thwing Road (B1253 road). It consists of a stone cross painted white, about 6 metres (20 ft) in height, with a splayed plinth on a base of four square steps. On the plinth is a brass plate with an inscription, and the names of those lost in the First World War. | II |
