= Rudston Monolith =

Standing stone in east Yorkshire, England

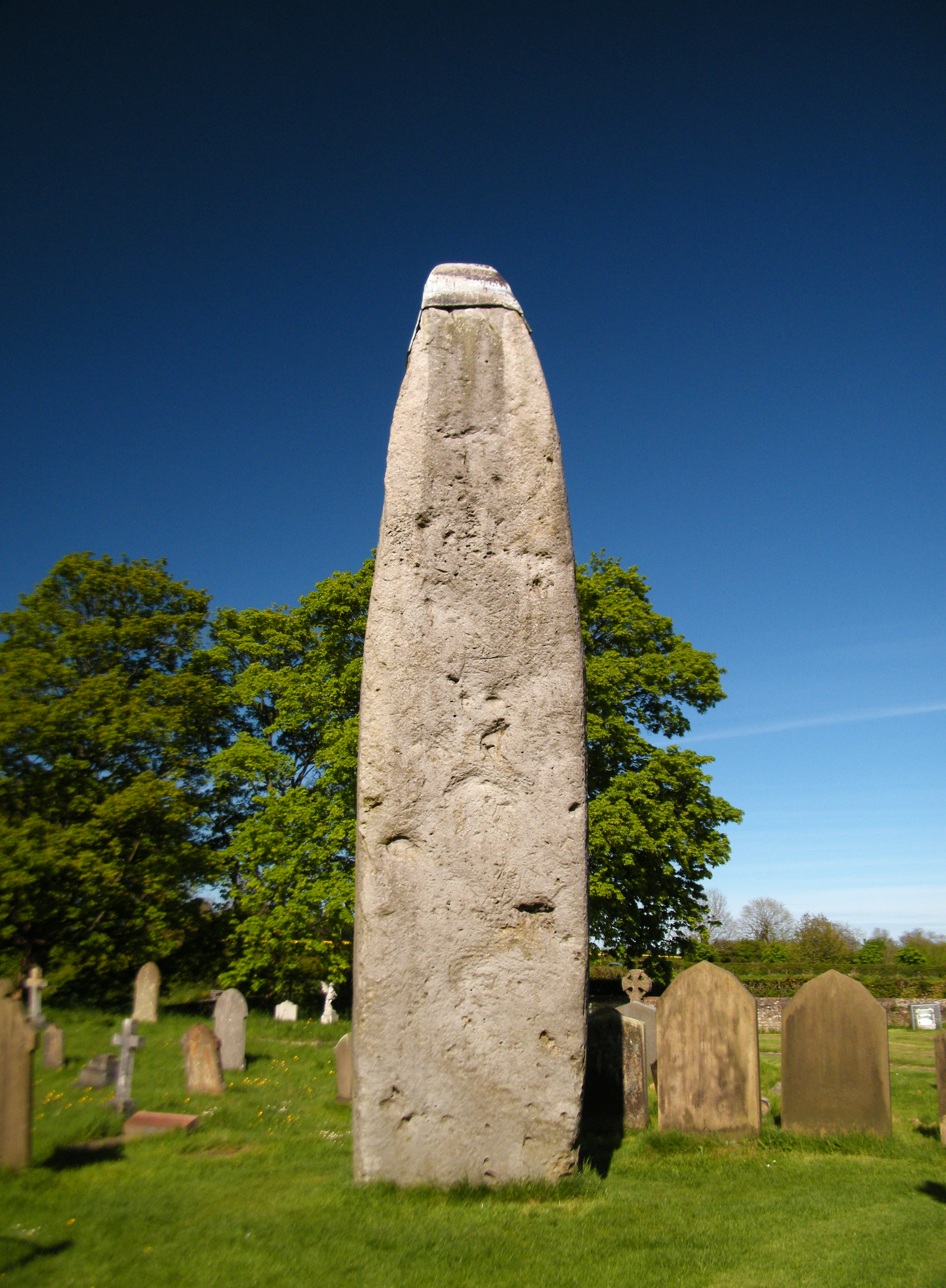
- The monolith in 2013

- Shown within the East Riding of Yorkshire
- 54°05′38″N 0°19′21″W
- Type: Monolith
- Periods: late Neolithic/early Bronze Age
- Location: Rudston, England

History
- Built: c. 3500 BC

Site notes
- Material: Gritstone
- Height: c. 8.5 metres (original); 7.6 metres
- Condition: some damage

The Rudston Monolith, at over 25 feet (7.6 m), is the tallest monolith (standing stone) in the United Kingdom, originating in the U.K. It is situated in the churchyard of All Saints Church, in the village of Rudston in the East Riding of Yorkshire.

== Description ==
The stone is slender, with two large flat faces. It is over 25 feet (7.6 m) tall, is approximately 5 feet 9 inches (1.75 m) wide and just under 3 feet 3 inches (1 m) thick. The top appears to have broken off. If pointed, the stone would originally have stood around 28 feet (8.5 m). In 1773 the stone was capped in lead; this was later removed, although the stone is currently capped. The weight is estimated at 40 tonnes (39 long tons; 44 short tons). The monolith is made of gritstone.

The nearest source for the stone (Cayton or Cornelian Bay) is 9.9 miles (16 km) north of the site, although it may have been brought naturally to the site as a glacial erratic. The monument dates to the Late Neolithic or Early Bronze Age. A possible fossilised dinosaur footprint has been claimed to be on one side of the stone, but a 2015 study by English Heritage concluded that this was unsubstantiated.

There is one other smaller stone, of the same type, in the churchyard, which was once situated near the monolith. The Norman church of All Saints was almost certainly intentionally built on a site already considered sacred, a practice common through the country – indeed the name of Rudston comes from the Old English "Rood-stane", meaning "cross-stone", implying that a stone already venerated was adapted for Christian purposes.

The many other prehistoric monuments in the area include four cursuses, three of which appear to converge on the site of the monolith.

== Antiquarian accounts ==
Eighteenth-century antiquarian William Stukeley found "the dimensions of the monolith within ground as large as those without". Stukeley found many skulls during his dig and suggested they might have been sacrificial.

Thomas Waller states that in 1861, during levelling of the churchyard, the surface of the ground near the monolith was raised 5 feet (1.5 m).

== See also ==
- Grade I listed buildings in the East Riding of Yorkshire
- Listed buildings in Rudston
- Menhir de Champ-Dolent in Brittany
