= Accelerant =

Substance increasing the rate of a chemical reaction

Accelerants, or accelerators, are substances that increase the rate of a natural or artificial chemical process. They play a major role in chemistry, as most chemical reactions can be hastened with an accelerant. Understanding accelerants is crucial in forensic science, engineering, and other fields where controlled chemical reactions are essential. Accelerants function by either altering a chemical bond, speeding up a chemical process, or changing the reaction conditions. Unlike catalysts, accelerants may be consumed during the process.

They are commonly used in contexts such as fire investigation where they can indicate arson, in construction to speed the curing of building materials, and in sulfur vulcanization to produce rubber products such as tyres. In fire investigation, accelerants are often detected through laboratory analysis of fire debris. Various types of accelerants exist, including liquids, solids, and gases, each with specific properties and applications.

== Applications ==
=== Vulcanization ===
Vulcanization of rubber can be categorized primarily into two types: sulfur and peroxide vulcanization. Both chemical processes are examples of using an accelerant.

Sulfur vulcanization, the more traditional method, uses sulfur to create cross-links between rubber polymer chains, enhancing flexibility and durability. Sulfur vulcanization is a chemical process crucial to the rubber industry, transforming raw rubber into a durable, elastic material. This process is suitable for a wide range of rubber products.

On the other hand, peroxide vulcanization uses organic peroxides to form cross-links, resulting in rubber that withstands higher temperatures and chemical exposure better than sulfur-vulcanized rubber. Each method offers distinct properties to the rubber, tailored to specific applications and performance requirements.

=== Cement and concrete ===
Cement accelerators are available as admixtures for use in concrete, mortar, render, and screed. The addition of an accelerator speeds the setting time and thus curing starts earlier. This allows concrete to be placed in winter with reduced risk of frost damage. Concrete is damaged if it does not reach a strength of 500 pounds per square inch (3.4 MPa) before freezing. Typical cement accelerators are calcium nitrate (Ca(NO_{3})_{2}), calcium formate (Ca(HCOO)_{2}), and sodium nitrate (NaNO_{3}).

=== Fire ===
In fire protection, the term accelerant has a different meaning than it does in chemistry. A fire accelerant is any material that initiates or promotes a fire, in cases including but not limited to arson; it may or may not be a chemical. (Chemists distinguish chemical accelerants from fuels, such as gasoline.) In fire reports, the term ignitable liquid also means an accelerant.

A fire is a self-sustaining, exothermic oxidation reaction that emits heat and light. Some oxygen-bearing accelerants such as NO_{2} cause a fire to produce more heat, consume fuel more quickly, and spread faster. Other accelerants such as gasoline cause the fire to burn more quickly without increasing its temperature.

== See also ==
- Chemical kinetics
- Rate equation
- Retarder (chemistry)
