= Retarder (chemistry) =

Chemical agent slowing down a chemical reaction

A retarder is a chemical agent that slows down a chemical reaction. For example, retarders are used to slow the chemical reaction hardening of plastic materials such as wallboard, concrete, and adhesives.

Sugar water acts as a retarder for the curing of concrete. It can be used to retard the chemical hardening of the surface, so that the top layer can be washed off to expose the underlying aggregate.

== See also ==
- Accelerant
