= Locmariaquer megaliths =

Large broken menhir in Locmariaquer, France

Coordinates: 47°34′19″N 2°57′00″W

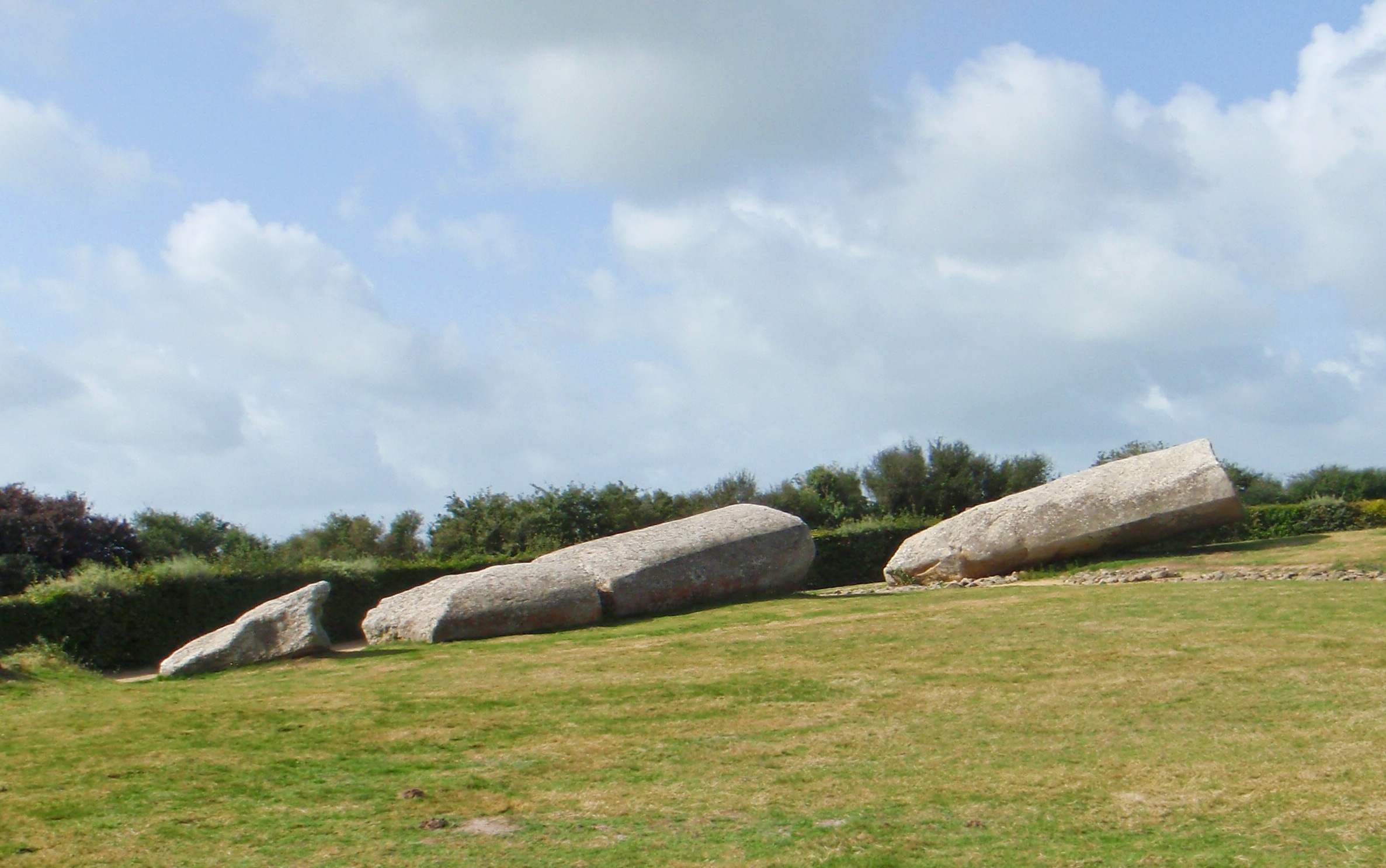
The Broken Menhir of Er Grah

The Locmariaquer megaliths are a complex of Neolithic constructions in Locmariaquer, Brittany. They comprise the elaborate Er-Grah tumulus passage grave, a dolmen known as the Table des Marchands and "The Broken Menhir of Er Grah", the largest known single block of stone to have been transported and erected by Neolithic people.

== The Broken Menhir of Er Grah ==
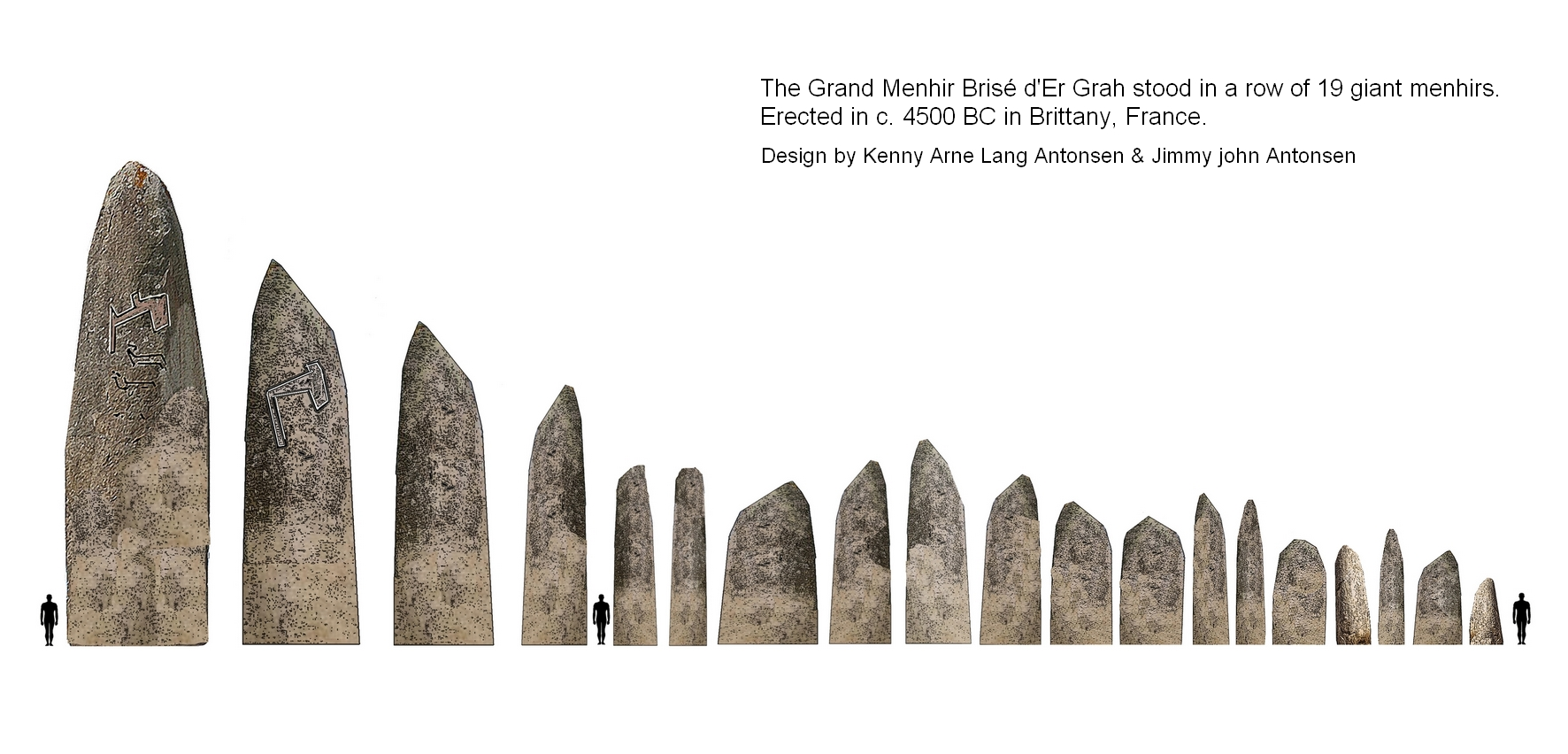
Artistic reconstruction of the Grand Menhir Er Grah with the 18 other menhirs in a row, c. 4500 BC

The broken menhir, erected around 4700 BC at the same time as another 18 blocks nearby, is thought to have been broken around 4000 BC. Measuring 20.6 metres (68 ft) and with a weight of 330 tons, the stone is from a rocky outcrop located several kilometres away from Locmariaquer. The impressive dimensions of this menhir still divide specialists about the techniques used for transport and erection, but the fact that this was achieved during the Neolithic era remains remarkable.

Worked over its entire surface, the monument bears a sculpture representing a "hatchet-plough". Unfortunately, today this is seriously eroded and very difficult to see.

=== Destruction ===
It is not known what caused the menhir to topple and break into the four pieces that are now seen. At one time, it was believed that the stone had never stood upright, but archaeological findings have proven that it did. The most popular theory is that the stone was deliberately pulled down and broken. Certainly other menhirs that accompanied it were removed and reused in the construction of tombs and dolmens nearby. However, in recent years, some archaeologists have favoured the explanation of an earthquake or tremor, and this theory is supported by a computer model.

=== Gallery ===
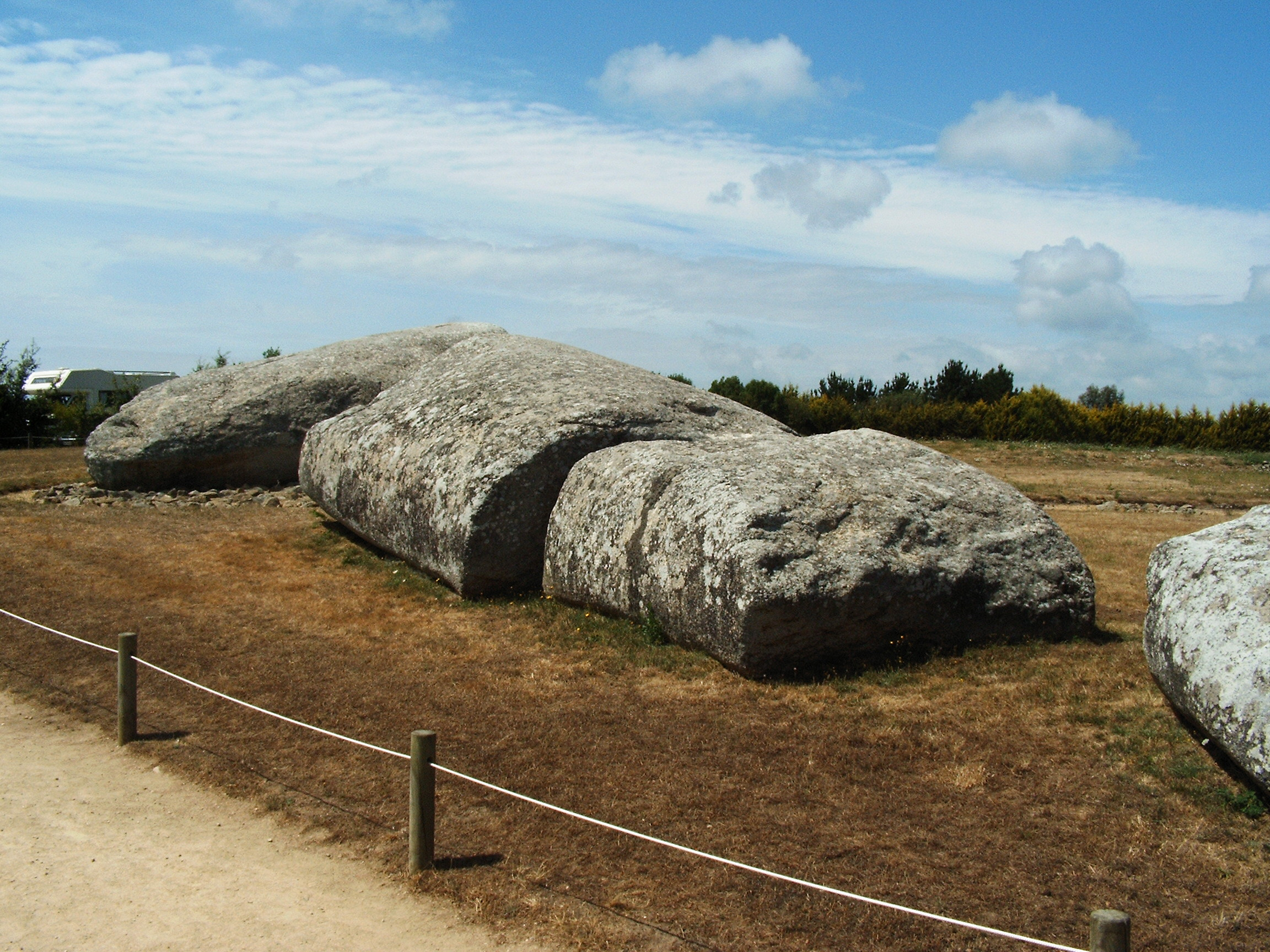
Grand Menhir

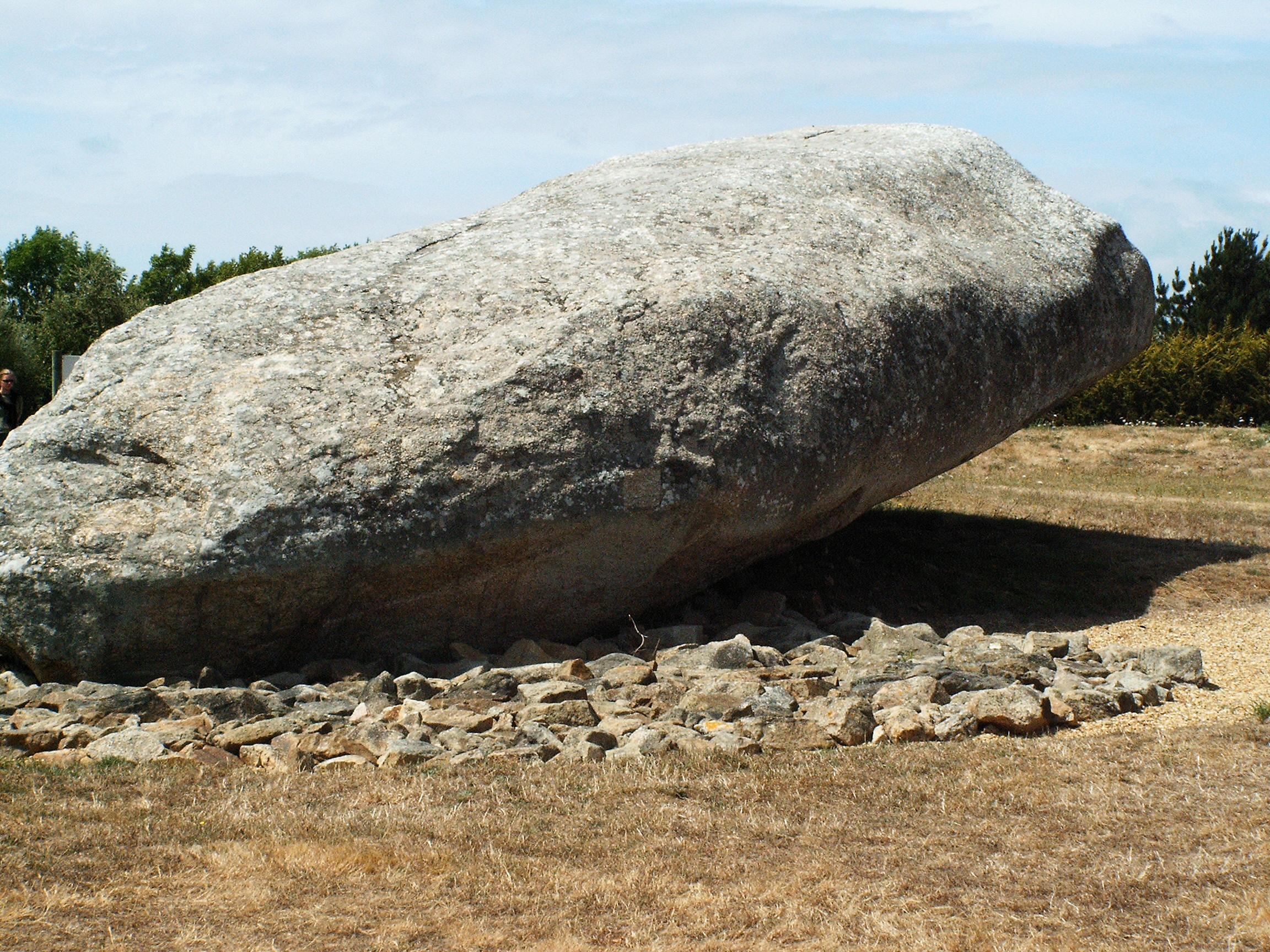
Grand Menhir

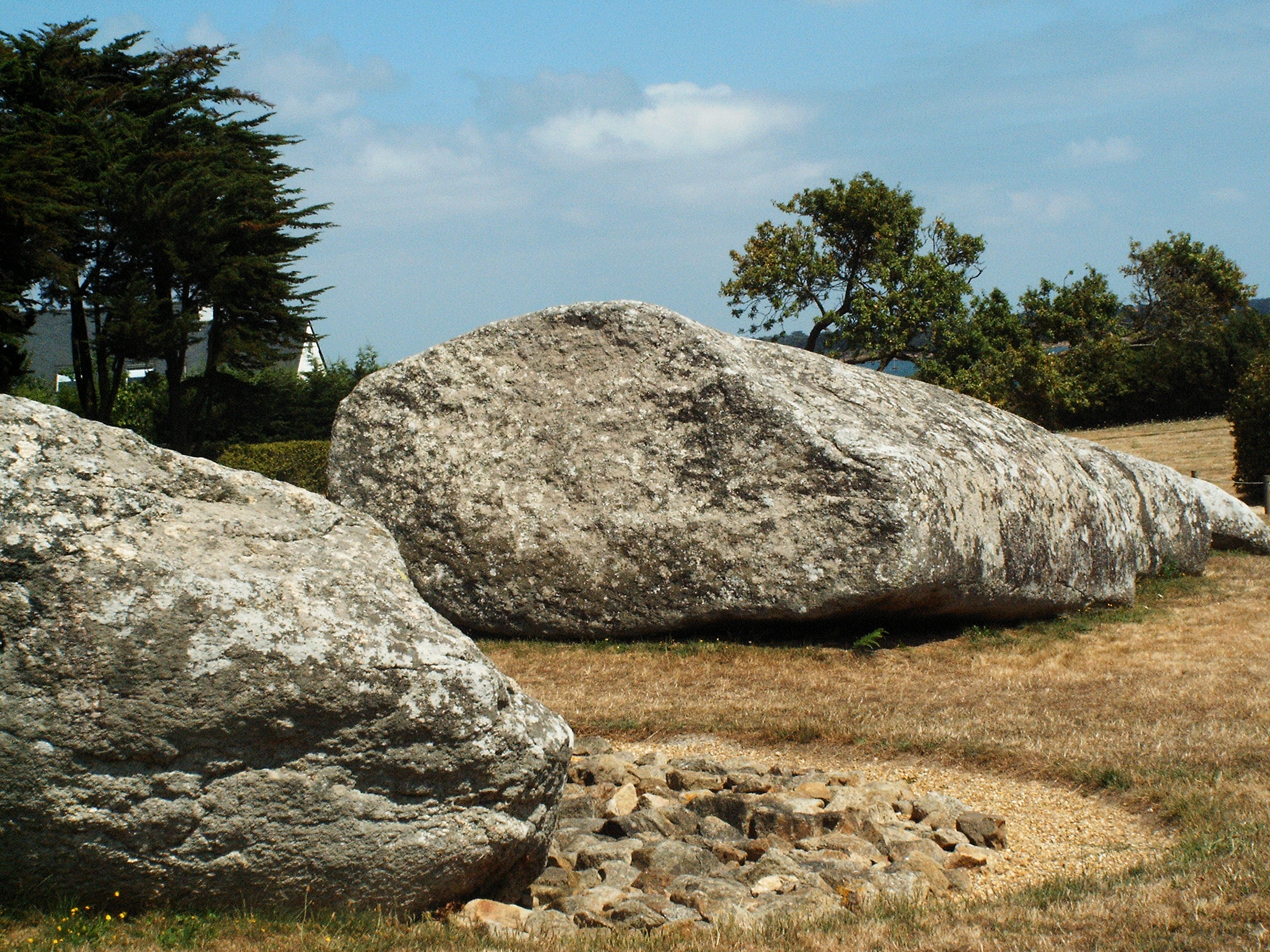
Grand Menhir

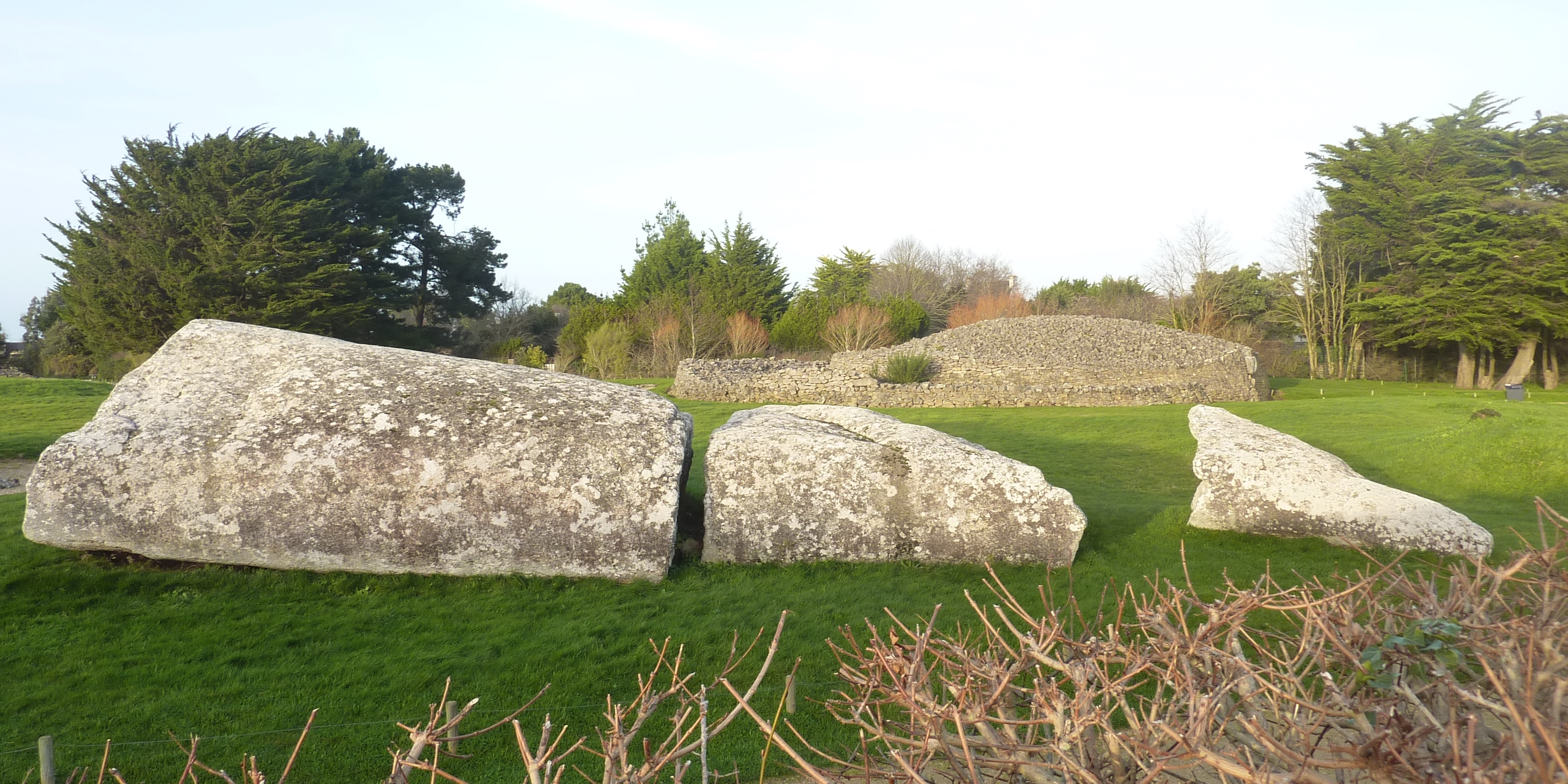
Grand Menhir and Table des Marchands

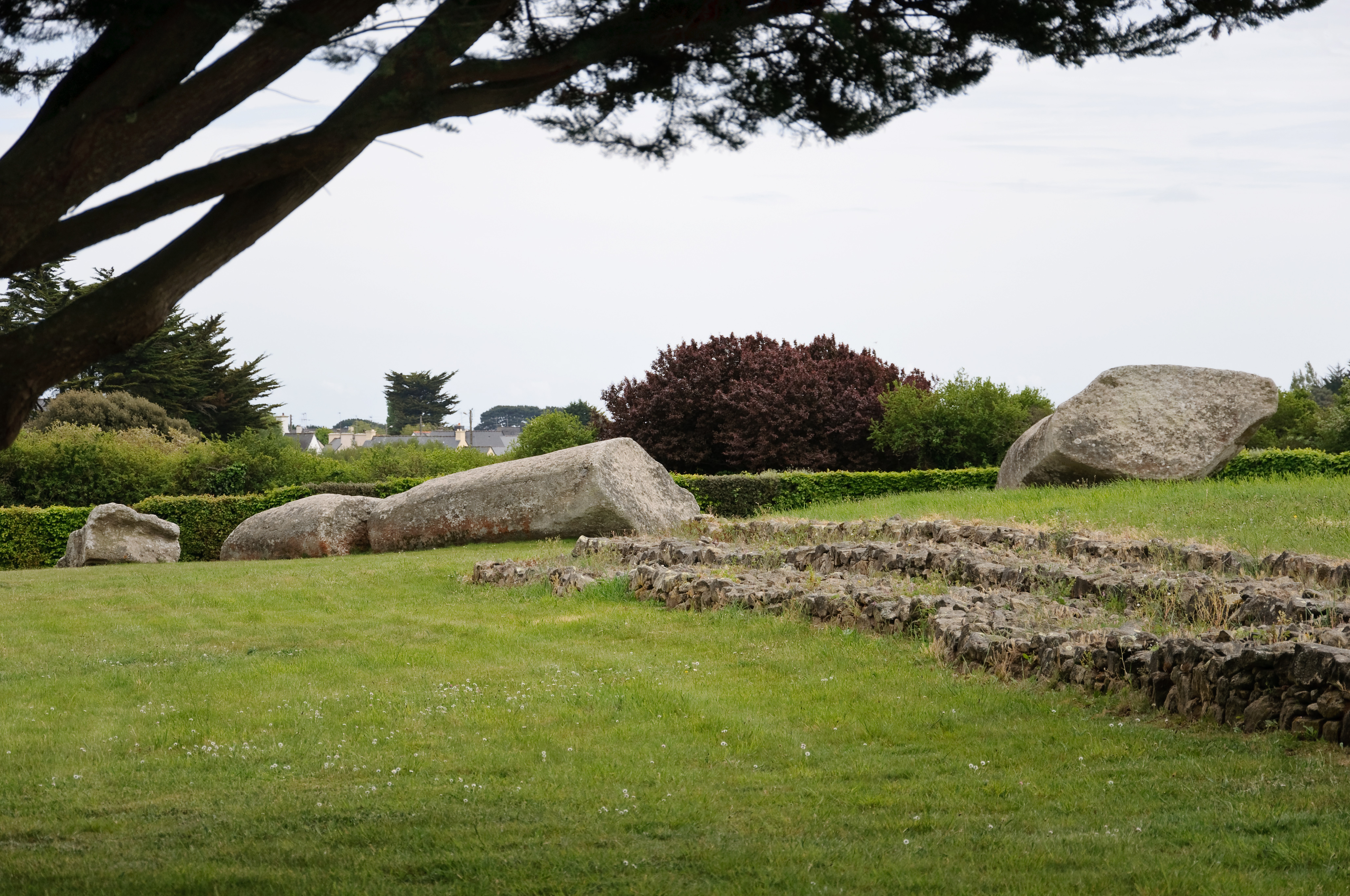
The Broken Menhir seen from the tumulus of Er Grah

== Table des Marchands ==
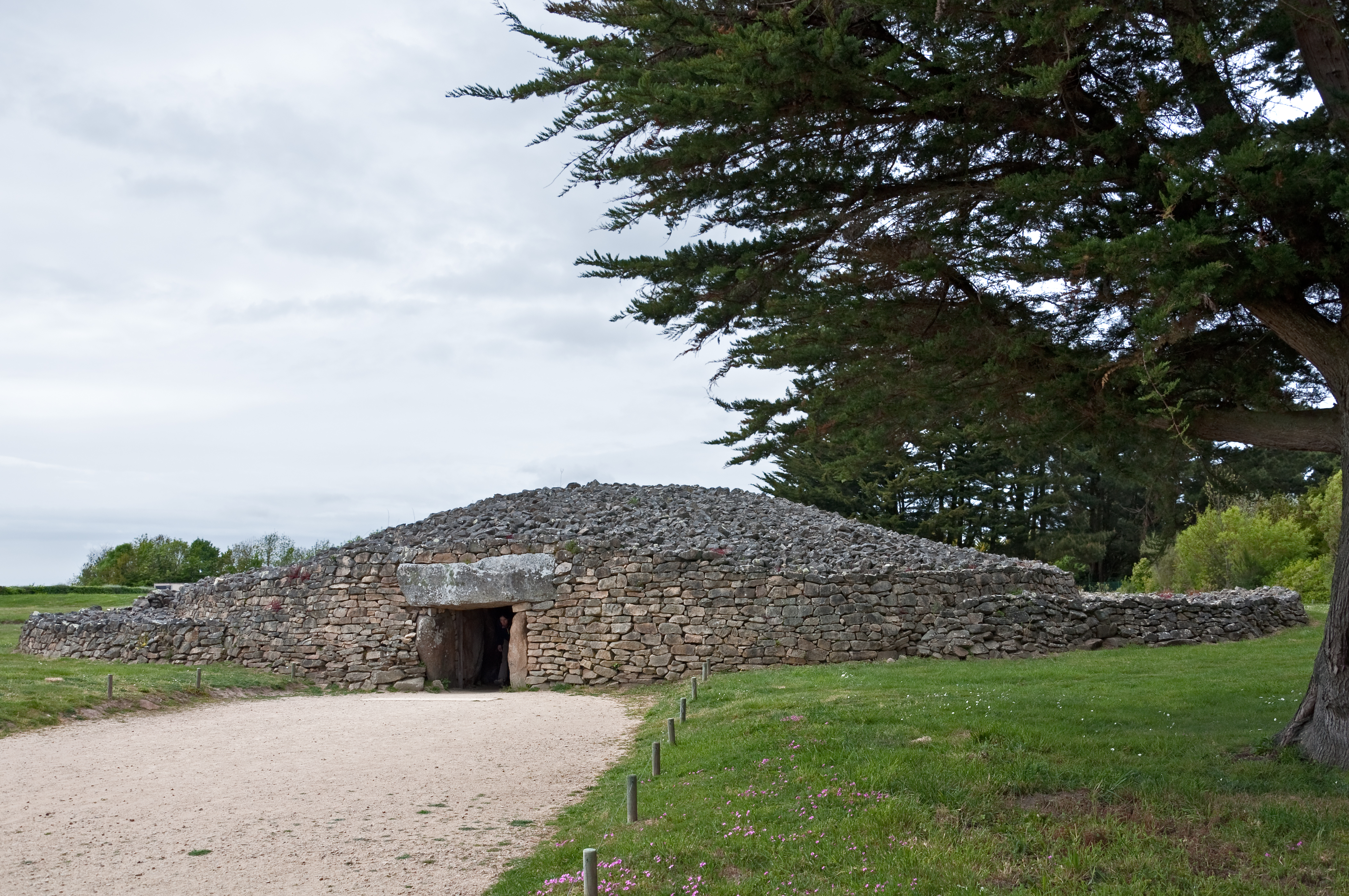
Table des Marchands

The Table des Marchands is a large dolmen containing a number of decorations. The main capstone of the chamber includes a large carving on its underside depicting an axe, and part of a carved depiction of a plough, apparently pulled by oxen. This fragment indicates that the capstone was originally part of the broken menhir, since the design matches up with carvings on the broken remains across the breaks. Other parts were used in the tumulus and in the nearby dolmen of Gavrinis, on a nearby island. The stone at the back of the chamber contained an engraved stele with whorls and arched decorations which may represent fields of crops.

The dolmen was fully exposed and above ground until it was excavated and rebuilt inside a cairn in 1993, reconstructing its original appearance and protecting its contents.

=== Gallery ===
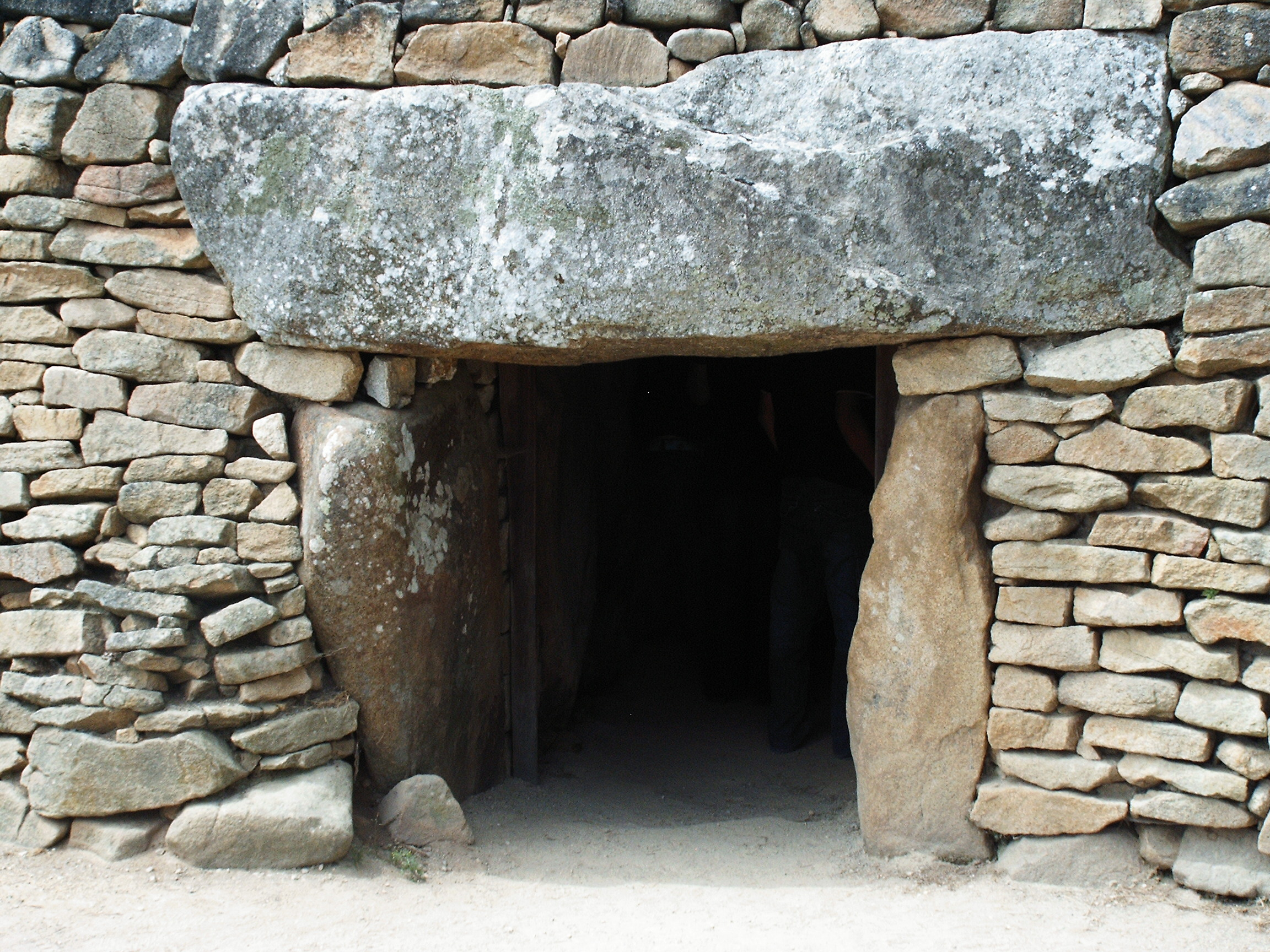
Table des Marchands

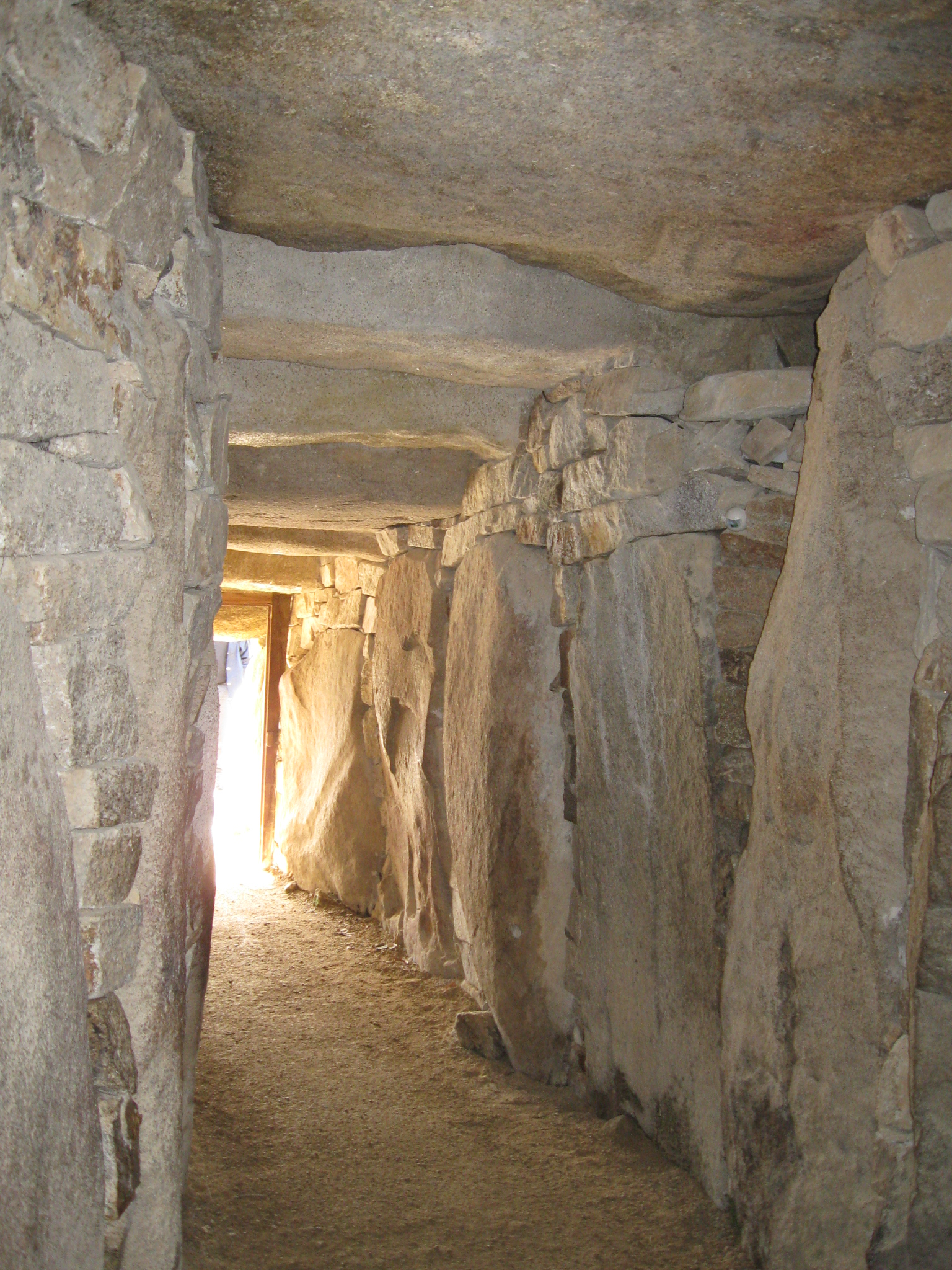
Table des Marchands, entrance corridor

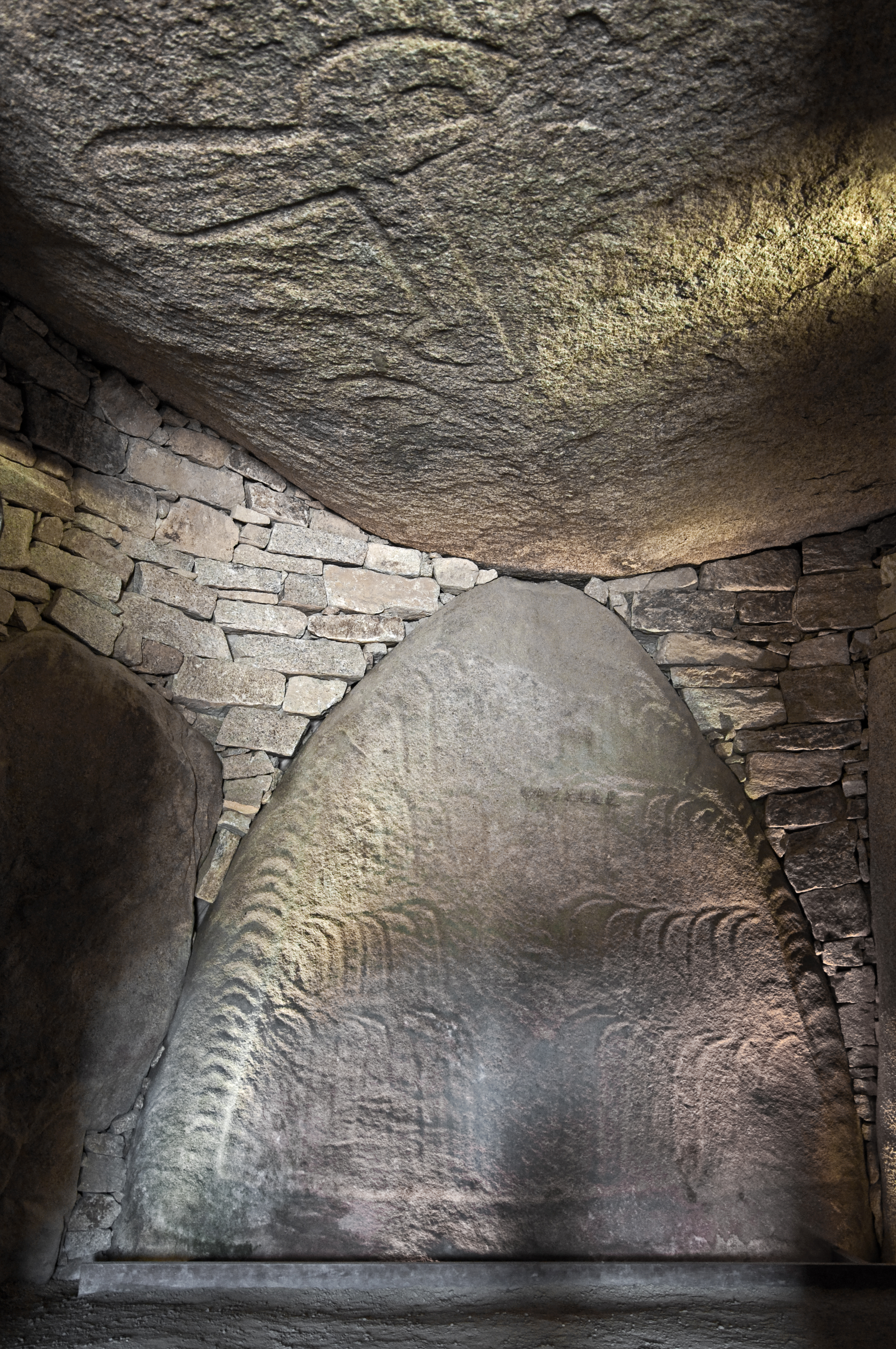
Interior of the Table des Marchands

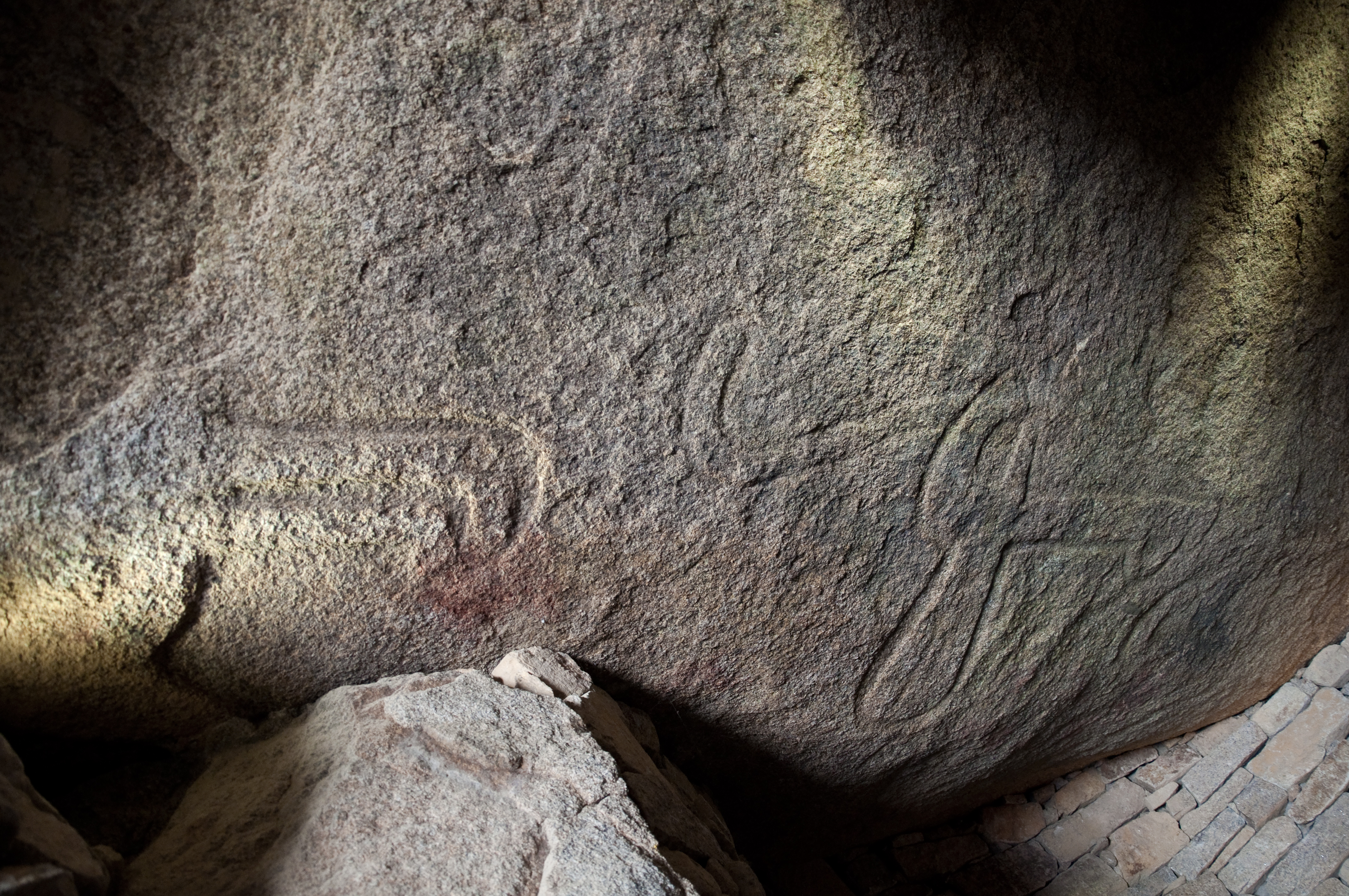
Engraving on the Table des Marchands ceiling

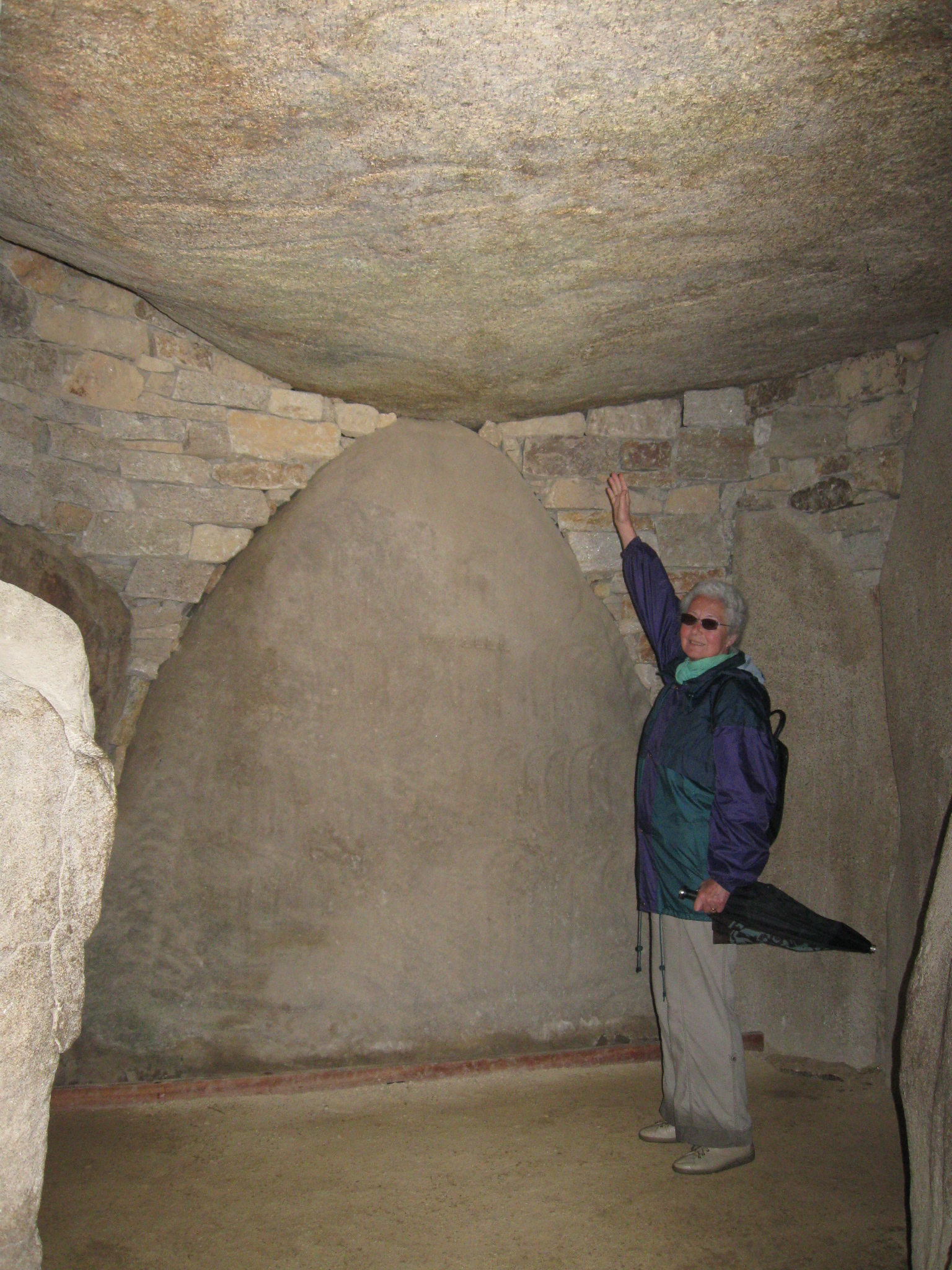
Table des Marchands, interior

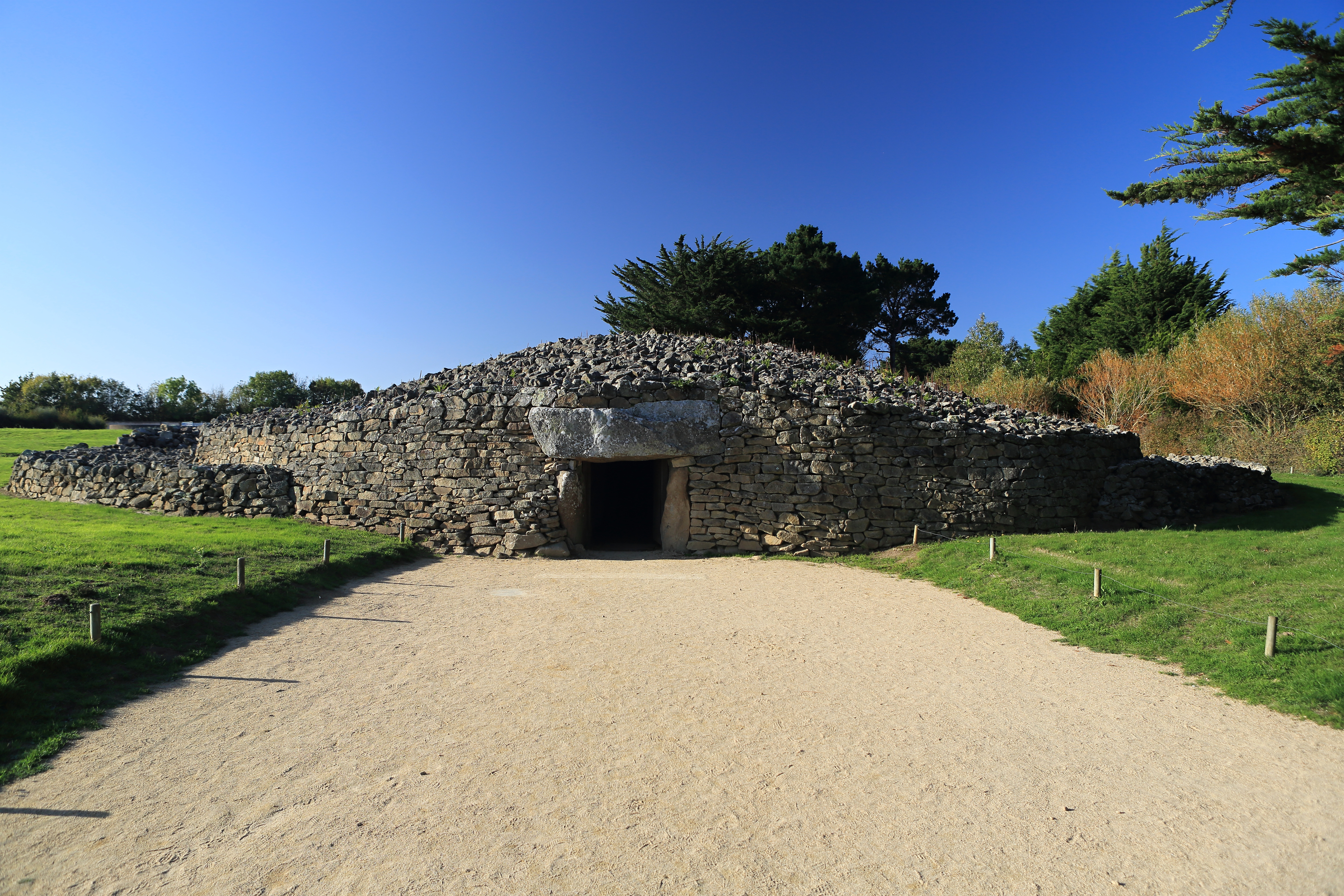
Table des Marchands

== Er-Grah tumulus ==
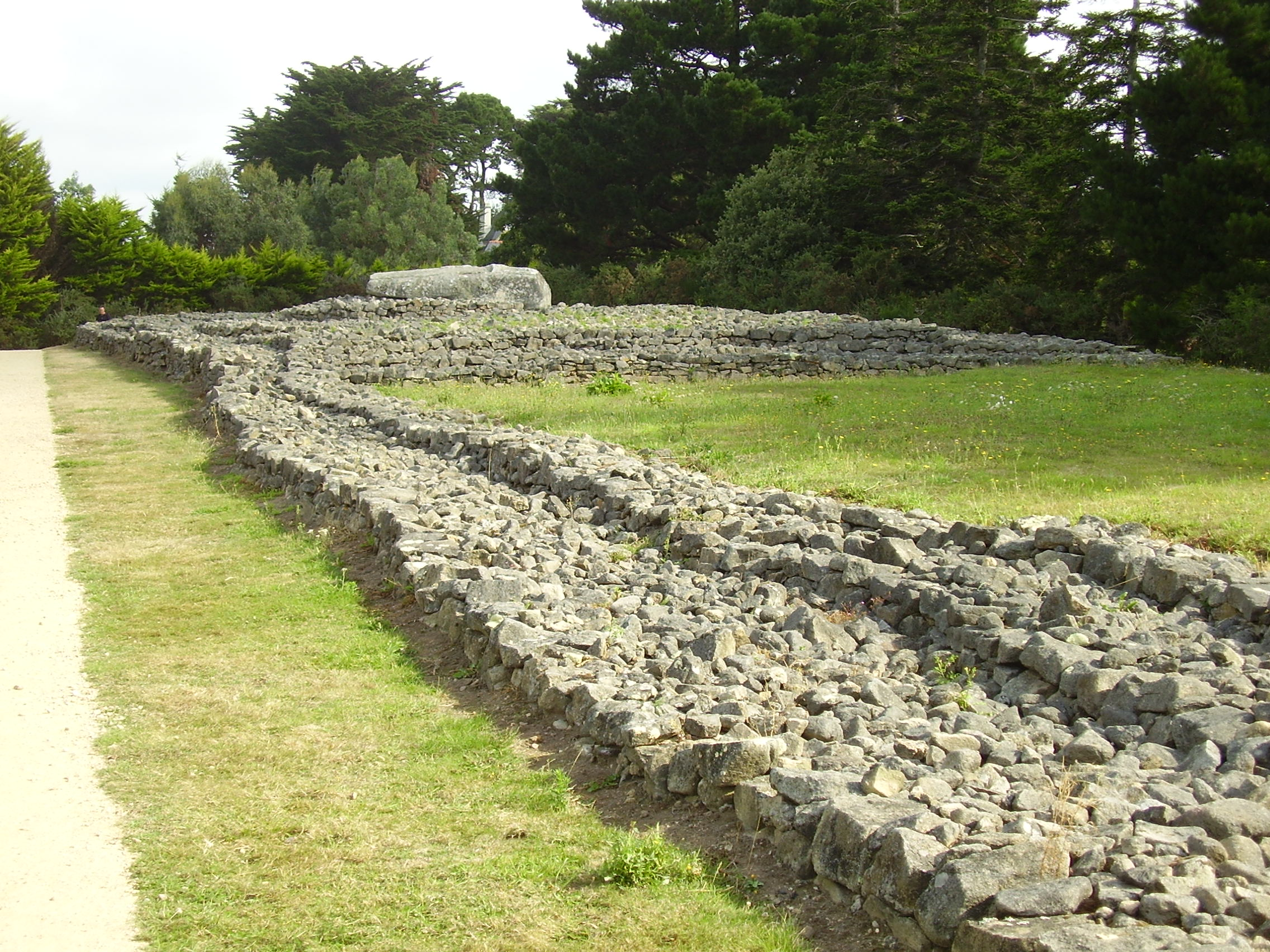
The tumulus of Er-Grah

The Er-Grah tumulus is 140 metres (460 ft) long. It was probably originally constructed in the fifth millennium BC as a cairn, which was extended in both directions. A pavement surrounded the stepped structure. The capstone indicates that the monument was completed at around 3,300 BC. According to A. W. R. Whittle, "In front of the south facade of the primary phase of the long cairn of Er Grah, close to where the menhir Brise originally stood...a pair of domesticated cattle were found in a pit. Radiocarbon determinations suggest a date in the late sixth and early fifth millennium BC."

=== Gallery ===
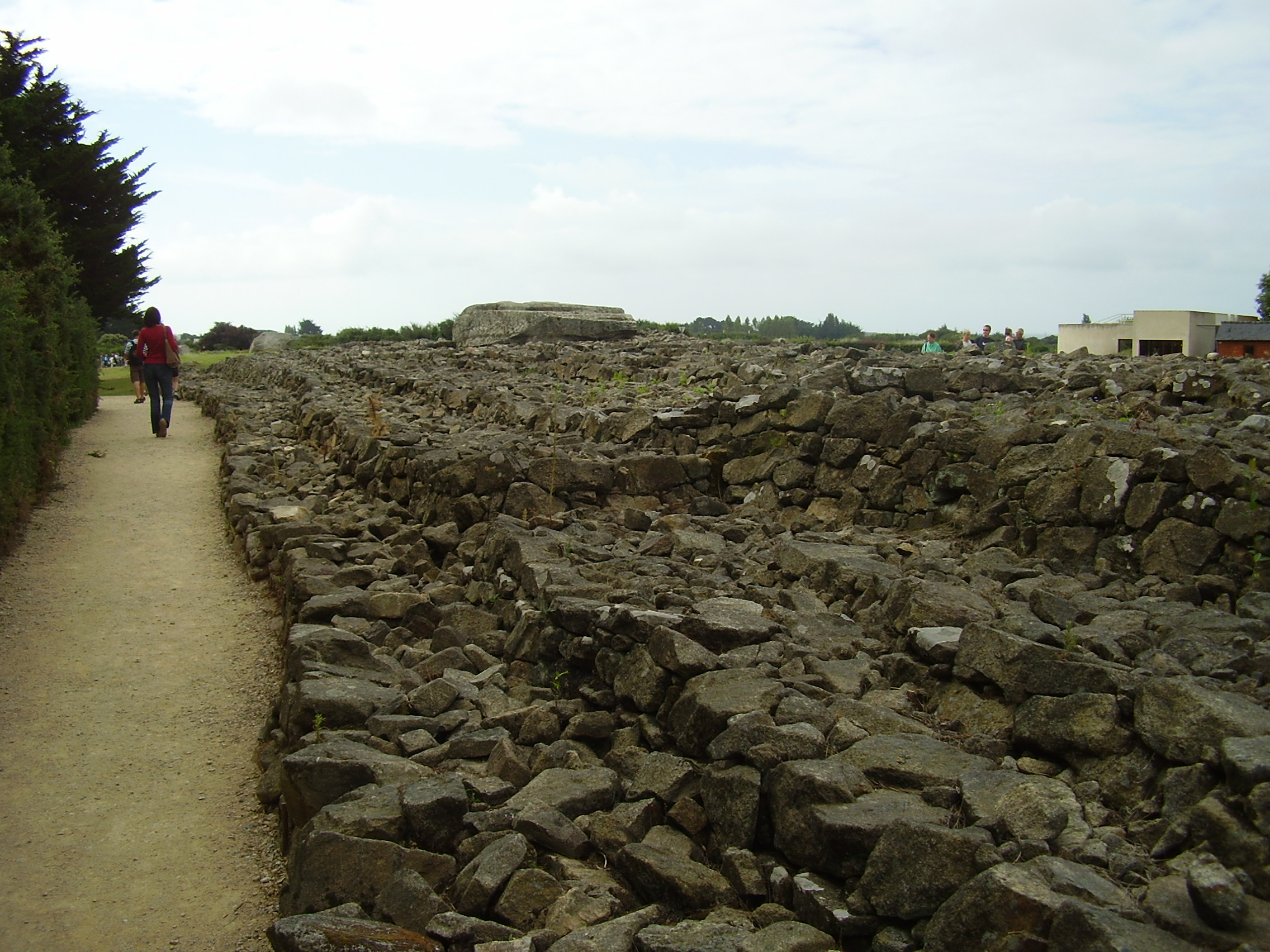

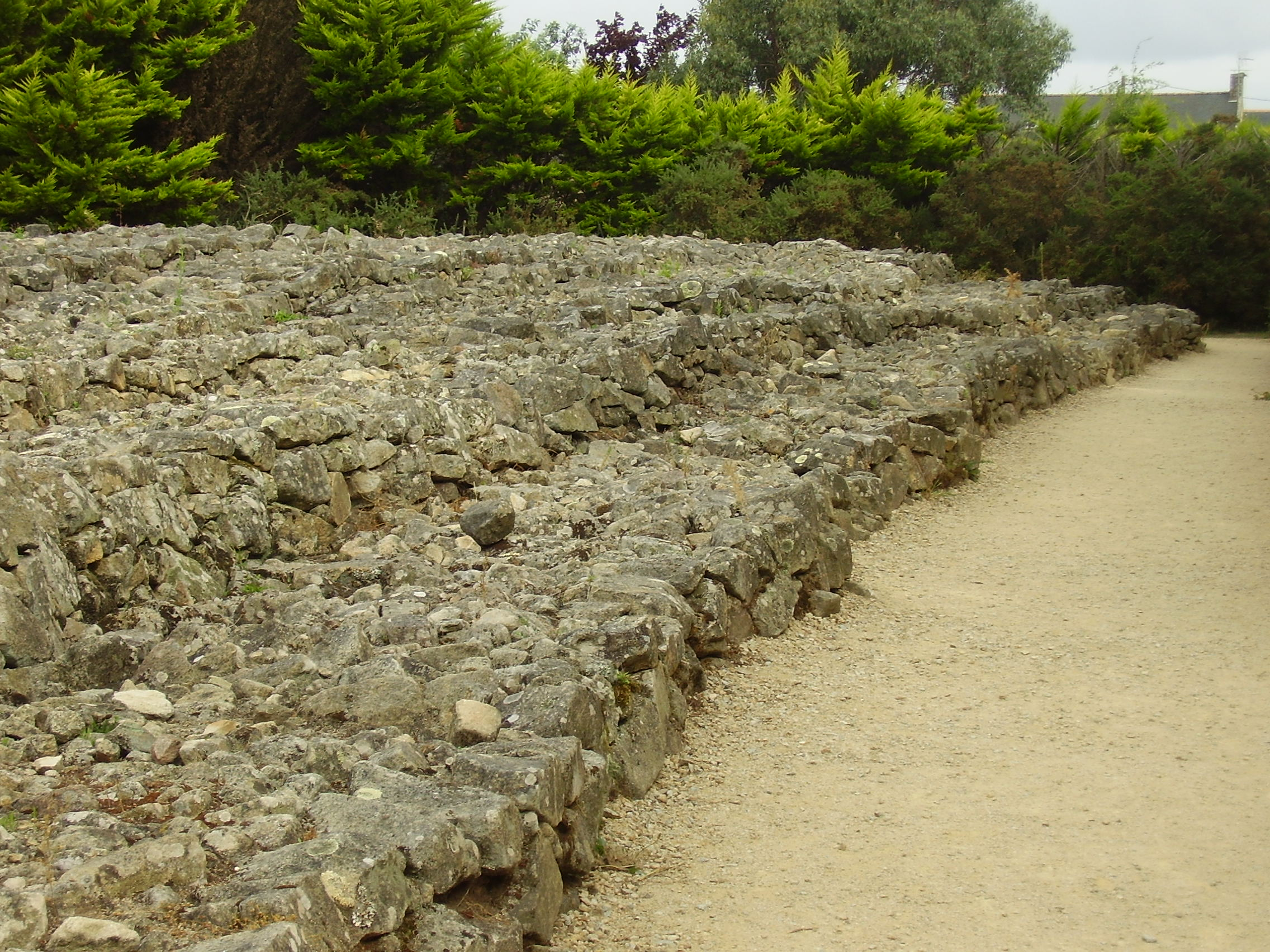

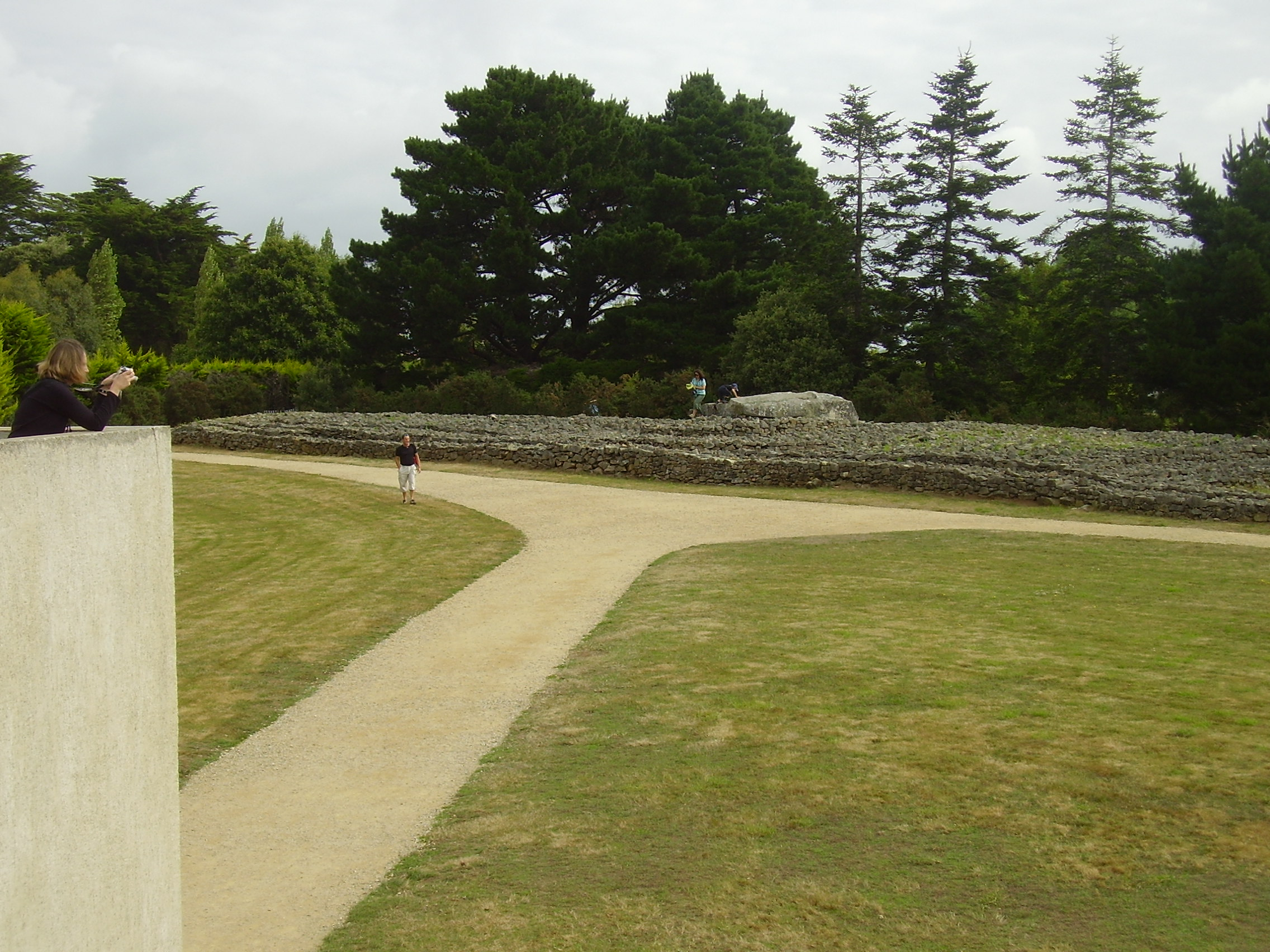

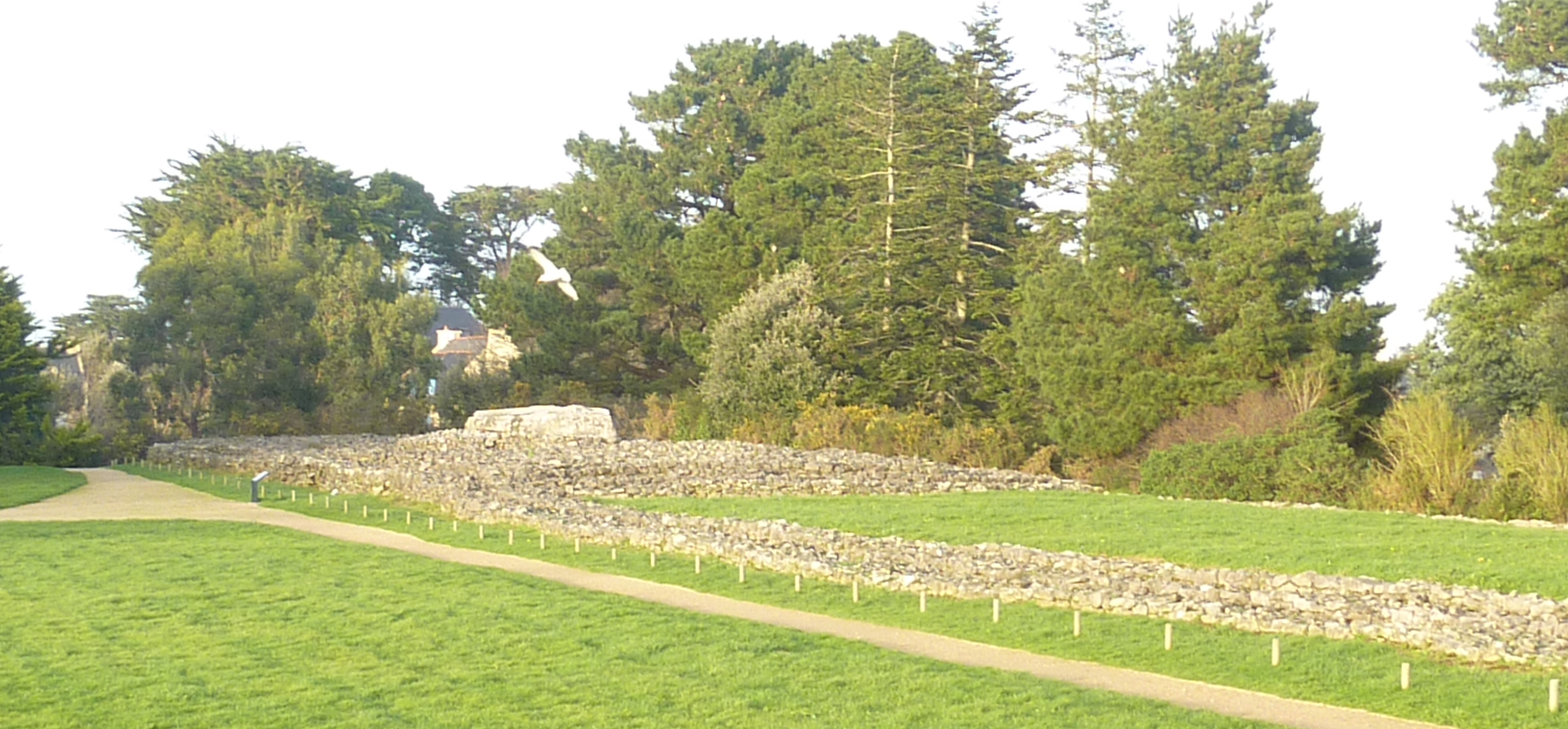

== See also ==
- Carnac Stones
- List of megalithic sites
- Official website
- Prehistoric Europe
- Neolithic Europe

== Bibliography ==
- Charles-Tanguy Le Roux, Éric Gaumé, Yannick Lecerf, Jean-Yves Tinevez, Monuments mégalithiques à Locmariaquer (Morbihan): Le long tumulus d'Er Grah dans son environnement, CNRS éditions, 2007, ISBN 2-271-06490-2
