= Frost damage (construction) =

Damage caused by moisture freezing

Frost damage is caused by moisture freezing in the construction. Frost damage can occur as cracks, stone splinters and swelling of the material.

When water freezes, the volume of water increases by 9 %. When the volumetric moisture content exceeds 91 %, then the volume increase of water in the pores of the material caused by freezing cannot be absorbed by sufficient empty pores. This causes an increase in the internal pressure. If this pressure exceeds the tensile strength of the material, then micro-cracks occur. Visible frost damage develops after an accumulation of micro-cracks as a result of several freeze-thaw cycles.

Frost damage can be prevented by the use of frost-proof materials, i.e., a material which has sufficient closed pores, by which the volume increase caused by the freezing of water in capillary pores can be absorbed by the ice-free closed pores.

== Concrete ==
Frost damage of early-age concrete is particularly harmful for the concrete mechanical resistance because the ice volume expansion causes micro-cracks in the concrete structures, and as a consequence it lowers the compressive strength of concrete. Therefore, when concreting at cold temperature cannot be avoided, it is essential to have a minimum curing time at a temperature sufficiently above the freezing point of the concrete pore water, so that the early strength of concrete is high enough to resist the inner tensile stress caused by water freezing.

== See also ==
- Frost weathering
- Ice thermal expansion

== Sources ==
Bibliography

- Goesten A.J.P.M. (2016). Hygrothermal simulation model: Damage as a result of insulating historical buildings. Eindhoven University of Technology.
- ter Bekke T. (2001). Vochttransport in monumentaal metselwerk. Eindhoven University of Technology.

This article is a translation of the corresponding article on the Dutch Wikipedia.
