= List of megalithic monuments in Ireland =

This is a list of megalithic monument on the island of Ireland. Megalithic monuments are found throughout Ireland, and include burial sites (including passage tombs, portal tombs and wedge tombs (or dolmens)) and ceremonial sites (such as stone circles and stone rows).

Photograph	Name	County	Coordinates	Type	Age
	Aghanaglack	Fermanagh		court tomb (double)	6000-4000 years
	Annadorn Dolmen	Down	54°20′31.75″N 5°48′12.52″W	passage tomb	5000-6000 years
	Ardgroom	Cork	51°44′23.23″N 9°53′37.9″W	stone circle	3500-2500 years
	Audleystown Court Tomb	Down	54°22′29.13″N 5°35′58.08″W	court tomb	5900-5500 years
	Aughlish	Londonderry	54.896°N 7.041°W	stone circles	-
-	Ballinran Court Tomb	Down	-	court tomb	-
-	Ballyalton Court Tomb	Down	54.3288°N 5.6463°W	court tomb	-
-	Ballyedmonduff Wedge Tomb	Dublin	-	wedge tomb	-
	Ballykeel Dolmen	Armagh	54.136696°N 6.471204°W	portal tomb	-
	Ballylumford Dolmen	Antrim	54°50′30″N 5°46′26″W	portal tomb	4000 years
	Ballymacaldrack Court Tomb	Antrim	55°0′5.9″N 6°24′15.3″W	court tomb	-
	Ballynoe stone circle	Down	54.290937°N 5.726292°W	stone circle	-
	Beaghmore	Tyrone	54°42′14″N 6°56′11″W	stone circles, cairns	-
-	Beenalaght	Cork	-	stone row	-
	Beltany stone circle	Donegal	54°51.025′N 7°36.28′W	stone circle	-
	Bocan Stone Circle	Donegal	55.27222°N 7.14805°W	stone circle	-
-	Bohonagh	Cork	51.580102°N 8.998987°W	stone circle	-
	Brownshill Dolmen	Carlow	-	portal tomb	5000–6000 years
-	Carnfree	Roscommon	-	cairns, standing stones	-
	Carrigagulla	Cork	-	stone circles, stone rows	-
	Carrowkeel Tombs	Sligo	54°03′12″N 8°22′40″W	passage tombs	5100–5400 years
	Carrowmore	Sligo	54°15′03.08″N 8°31′09.00″W	various	-
	Castlenalacht Stone Row	Cork	-	Stone row	-
	Castlestrange stone	Roscommon	-	standing stone	-
	Cloghanmore	Donegal	-	court tomb	-
	Cohaw	Cavan	-	court tomb	-
	Corick	Londonderry	54.748°N 6.791°W	stone circles	-
	Coom Wedge Tomb	Kerry	51°49′24.7″N 10°18′48.9″W	wedge tomb	-
-	Craigs Dolmen	Antrim	55°00′07″N 6°28′26″W	passage tomb	-
	Dowth (part of Brú na Bóinne)	Meath	53°42′10.5″N 6°26′57″W	passage tomb	-
	Drombeg stone circle	Cork	51.564553°N 9.08702°W	recumbent stone circle	-
	Drumskinny	Fermanagh	54.58443°N 7.69051°W	stone circle, cairn	4000 years
-	Eightercua	Kerry	51.81491°N 10.15807°W	stone row	3700 years
	Fourknocks Passage Tomb	Meath	53.596583°N 6.326479°W	passage tomb	4750-5000 years
	Faulagh	Mayo	54.26667°N 9.78333°W	various	-
-	Gartnanoul	Cavan	-	court tomb	-
	Giant's Ring	Down	54°32′25″N 5°57′0″W	passage tomb	-
	Glantane East	Cork	52.004426°N 9.04485°W	various	-
	Goward Dolmen	Down	54.21464°N 6.09132°W	portal tomb	-
	Grange stone circle	Limerick	52°30′51.45″N 8°32′30.45″W	stone circle	-
	Kealkill stone circle	Cork	51.7452°N 9.3707°W	stone circle	-
	Kilclooney More	Donegal	54.817718°N 8.4331537°W	two portal tombs, one court tomb	
	Kilmashogue	Dublin	-	wedge tomb, portal tombs, standing stones	-
	Kilmogue	Kilkenny	52.403143°N 7.262261°W	portal tomb	
	Knockmany Passage Tomb	Tyrone	54°26′51″N 7°9′34″W	passage tomb	5000 years
	Knockmaree Dolmen	Dublin	53°21′4″N 6°20′30″W	cist	
Knocknakilla 0535	Knocknakilla	Cork	52.00680°N 9.02448°W	stone circle, standing stone	
Knocknakilla 0535	Knockroe Passage Tomb	Kilkenny	52°25′54″N 7°23′59″W	passage tomb	
	Knocknarea	Sligo	54.25891°N 8.57463°W	various	-
	Knowth (part of Brú na Bóinne)	Meath	53°42′06″N 6°29′30″W	passage tomb	5200 years
	Labbacallee	Cork	52.16983°N 8.33688°W	wedge tomb	-
	Legananny Dolmen	Down	54.323°N 6.020°W	portal tomb	-
	Lia Fáil	Meath	53°34′39″N 6°36′43″W	standing stone	-
	Lisnadarragh Wedge Tomb	Monaghan	54°0′48″N 6°53′44″W	wedge tomb	-
	Listoghil (part of Carrowmore)	Sligo	-	-	5380–5640 years
	Loughcrew Cairns	Meath	53°46′10″N 7°6′11″W	cairns	5300–5500 years
-	Magh Slécht	Cavan	-	various	-
	Meehambee Dolmen	Roscommon	-	portal tomb	5500 years
-	Moylehid	Fermanagh	-	passage tomb, cairn	-
	Newgrange or Sí an Bhrú (part of Brú na Bóinne)	Meath	53°41′39.73″N 6°28′30.11″W	passage tomb	5000 years
	Poulnabrone dolmen	Clare	53°2′55.83″N 9°8′23.83″W	portal tomb	-
	Slidderyford Dolmen	Down	-	portal tomb	-
-	Tallowroe	Galway	-	standing stone	-
	Templebryan Stone Circle	Cork	51.64316°N 8.88335°W	stone circle	-
	Tibradden	Dublin	53°14′20.15″N 6°16′52.74″W	passage tomb	-
	Townleyhall (part of Brú na Bóinne)	Louth	-	passage tomb	5000 years
	Turoe stone	Galway	53°15′N 8°33′W	standing stone	-
	Uragh Stone Circle	Kerry	51°48′42.23″N 9°41′37.74″W	stone circle	-

== See also ==
- Irish megalithic tombs
