= Dunloy =

Village in County Antrim, Northern Ireland

Coordinates: 55.0112°N 6.4116°W

Dunloy: Irish: Dún Lathaí
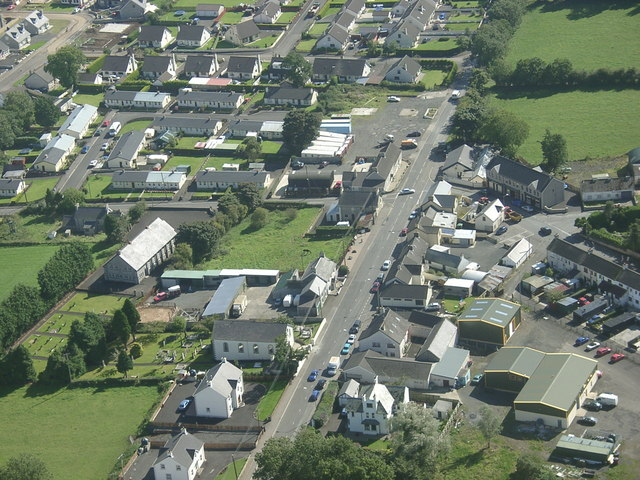
- Main Street

- Location within Northern Ireland
- Population: 1,150 (2021 Census)
- County: County Antrim
- Country: Northern Ireland
- Sovereign state: United Kingdom
- Post town: BALLYMENA
- Postcode district: BT44
- Dialling code: 028
- Police: Northern Ireland
- Fire: Northern Ireland
- Ambulance: Northern Ireland
- UK Parliament: North Antrim
- NI Assembly: North Antrim

Dunloy (from Irish Dún Lathaí, meaning 'fort of the muddy place or marsh') is a village and townland in County Antrim, Northern Ireland. It is located 11 miles (18 km) north of Ballymena and 6 miles (10 km) north-west is Ballymoney. It is located in the civil parish of Finvoy, in the former barony of Kilconway. The village had a population of 1,150 people in the 2021 Census.

== History ==
Dunloy lies in the ancient Irish district of "Killimorrie", which is now known as Killymurris. Killymurris is claimed as being derived from the Irish Coill Ui Mhuireadhaigh meaning "the wood of Murry". An alternate origin given for Killymurris is that it derives from Choill Mhuiris meaning "the wood of Morris".

Just south of Dunloy village, in the townland of Ballymacaldrack is "Dooey's Cairn". This open court tomb, named after the landowner, is located on the slopes of Long Mountain and overlooks the valley of the River Main. The earliest known activity within the tomb is estimated at around 4000BC. Also on Long Mountain is another court Tomb, known as Broadstone. See: List of megalithic monuments in Ireland

In the same townland lies the ancient graveyard of Caldernagh.

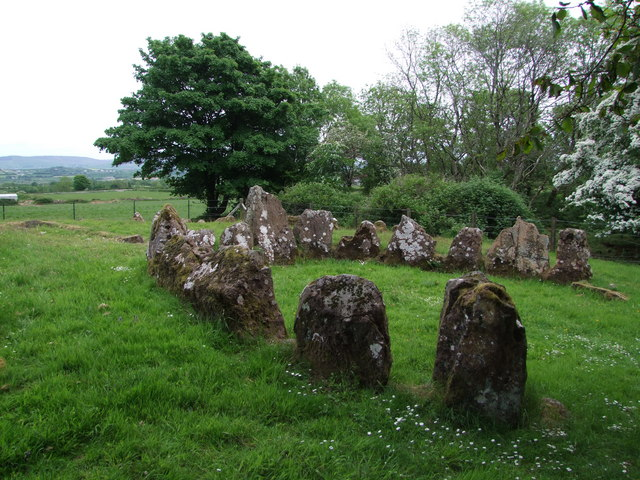
Dooey's Cairn

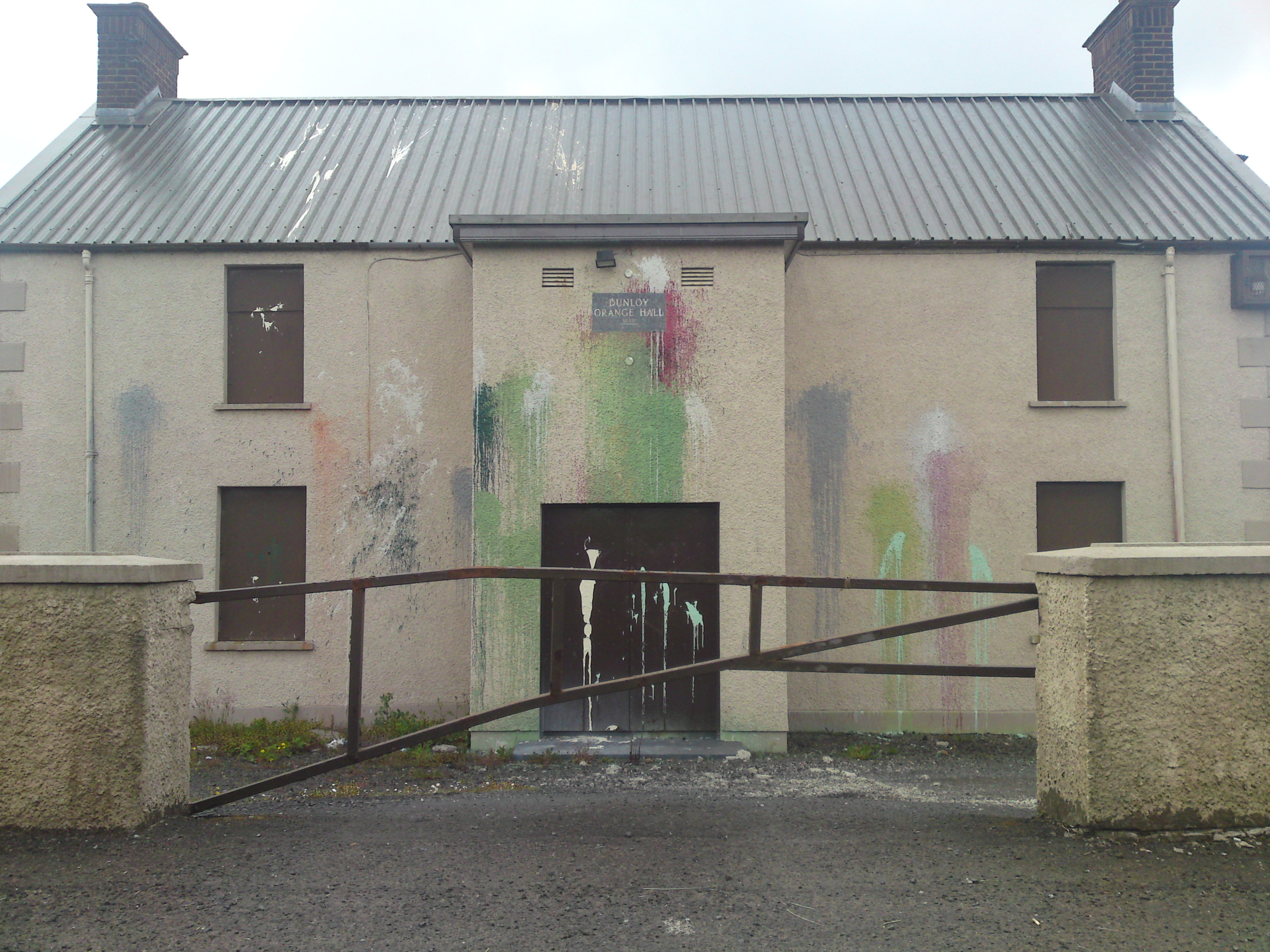
Dunloy Orange Hall after a paint attack

== Railways ==
Dunloy railway station is currently closed on the Belfast-Derry railway line run by Northern Ireland Railways.

== Recent history ==
Since 1996 residents have shown opposition to Loyal Order parades in Dunloy. Parades are currently prohibited from entering the centre of the village. Loyalists in nearby Ballymena counter-protested by holding weekly protests at a Catholic church situated in the predominantly loyalist Harryville area of Ballymena.

These protests have since ended. There have been many attacks on the local Orange Hall. On 12 July 2005, locals blocked the road in an attempt to stop the Orange Order from marching through the village.

=== The Troubles ===
On 11 July 1978, John Boyle, a 16-year-old civilian, was shot dead by SAS soldiers in a graveyard in the village. The previous day he had discovered an IRA arms cache under a fallen tombstone when he was visiting a family grave and reported the weapons to his father. His father then contacted the Royal Ulster Constabulary who, rather than removing the weapons, passed the information to the British Army, who placed SAS operatives at the site. The next day, Boyle returned to the graveyard (presumably out of curiosity to see if the weapons were still there). He was then shot dead by the British soldiers, who alleged he picked up a rifle and aimed it towards them; however a leaked RUC document confirmed that Boyle was shot in the back and his fingerprints were not on any of the recovered weapons. Two soldiers were put on trial for the killing, but both were acquitted and the Boyle family never received any form of apology from the security forces.

On 21 February 1984, 26-year-old Sergeant Paul Oram, a member of the British Army (14 Intelligence Company, parent regiment 9th/12th Royal Lancers), along with 18-year-old Declan Martin and 21-year-old Henry Hogan, both Catholic members of the Provisional Irish Republican Army, were killed in a gun battle between undercover British Army members and Provisional Irish Republican Army members in Dunloy.

== Demography ==
As of the 2011 census, Dunloy had a population of 1,194 people (381 households). On census day in 2011:

- 98.91% were from the white (including Irish traveller)ethnic group;
- 94.47% were from a Catholic community background and 4.19% were from a 'Protestant and Other Christian (including Christian related)' community background;
- 10.89% indicated that they had a British national identity, 59.13% indicated an Irish national identity and 29.82% indicated a Northern Irish identity.

== Notable people ==
- Philip McGuigan (born 1973), Sinn Féin Member of the Northern Ireland Assembly (MLA) for North Antrim since 2016, lives in Dunloy
