= Knockmany Passage Tomb =

Neolithic monument in County Tyrone, Northern Ireland

Knockmany passage tomb
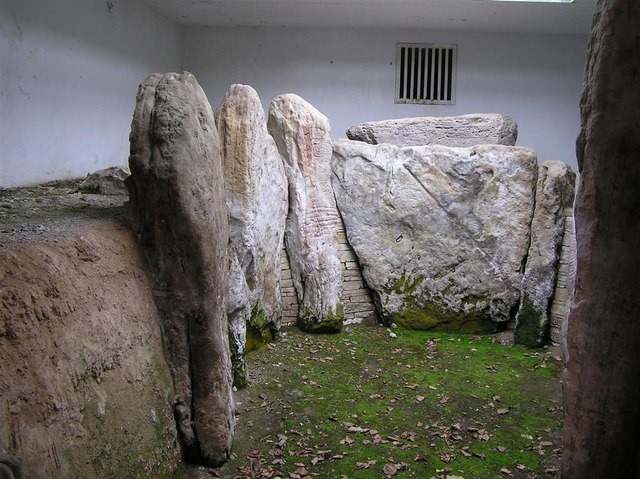
- The tomb in 2006

- Location in Northern Ireland, United Kingdom
- 54°26′51″N 7°9′34″W
- Type: Passage tomb
- Periods: Neolithic
- Location: Northern Ireland, United Kingdom
- OS grid reference: H 546 558

History
- Built: c. 3000 BC

Site notes
- Material: Sandstone
- Height: c. 2.13 meters

Knockmany passage tomb, or Anya's Cove, is an ancient burial monument on the summit of Knockmany Hill, near the village of Augher in County Tyrone, Northern Ireland. It is the remains of a Neolithic passage tomb and its stones are decorated with rare megalithic art. They are protected by a concrete chamber and mound, built in 1959 by the then Ministry of Finance for Northern Ireland, roughly resembling the mound that would have originally covered it. The stones can be viewed through the entrance gates. It is a monument in state care.

== Description ==
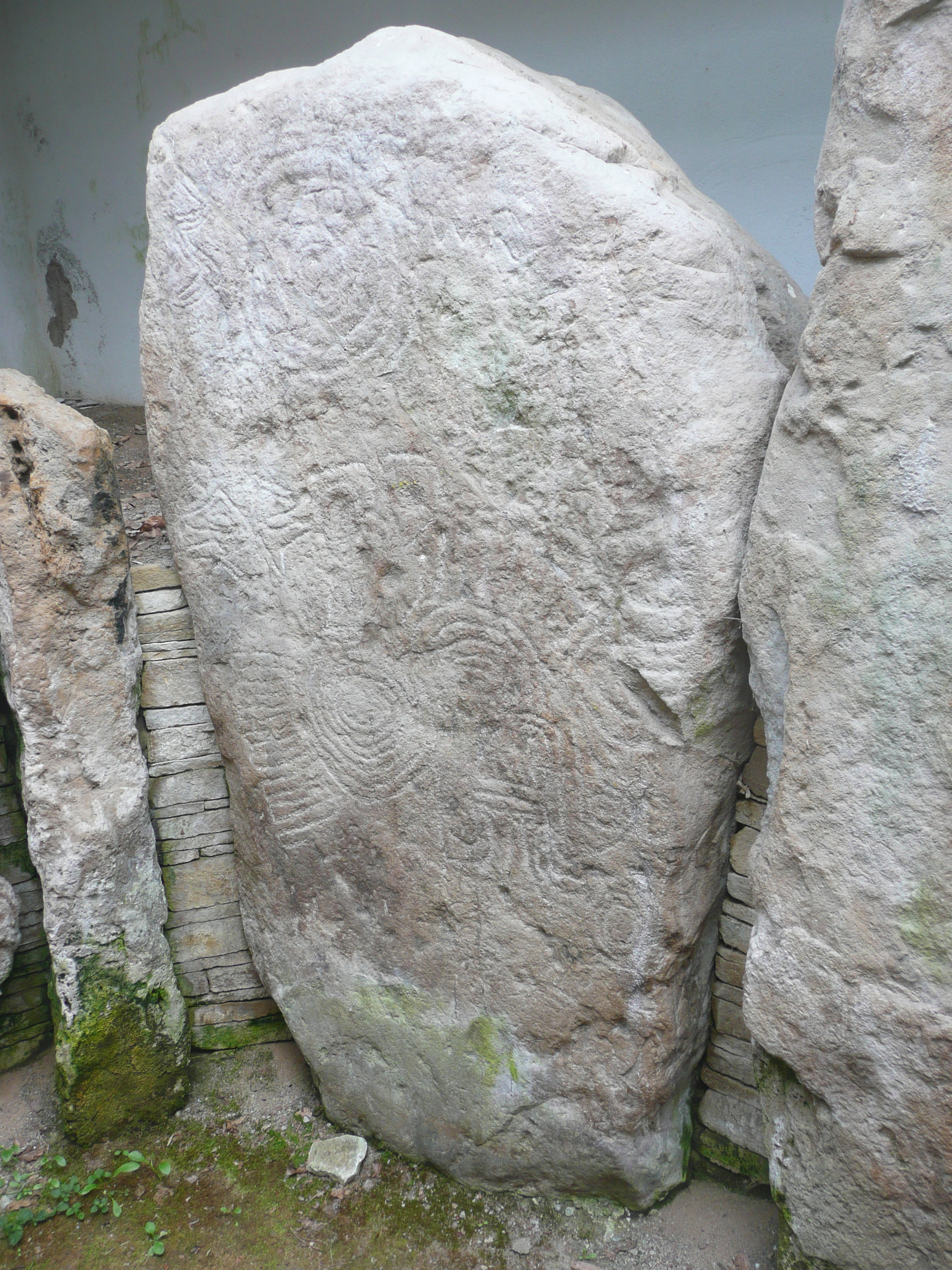
Leftmost of three central stones, showing carved decorations

The monument is a passage tomb built during the Neolithic, around 3000 BC. The chamber was originally covered with a stone cairn and earth. The 13 sandstone orthostats remain: these are of height 3–7 feet (0.91–2.13 m), and three of them show carved decorations including concentric circles, spirals and zigzags. They are similar to the decorated stones of the tombs at Loughcrew and Newgrange.

== Legends ==
Knockmany comes from Irish Cnoc mBáine 'Báine's hill'. Báine (meaning 'whiteness') was a supernatural being, probably a goddess, who became conflated with the more famous goddess Áine. According to legend, Queen Báine was wife of the 1st-century King Túathal Techtmar and was buried here, in the tomb of the earlier Queen Áine.

In Irish folklore, the location was the home of Fionn mac Cumhaill (Finn McCool) and his wife Oonagh.

== See also ==
- Irish megalithic tombs
- List of megalithic monuments in Ireland
