= Coom Wedge Tomb =

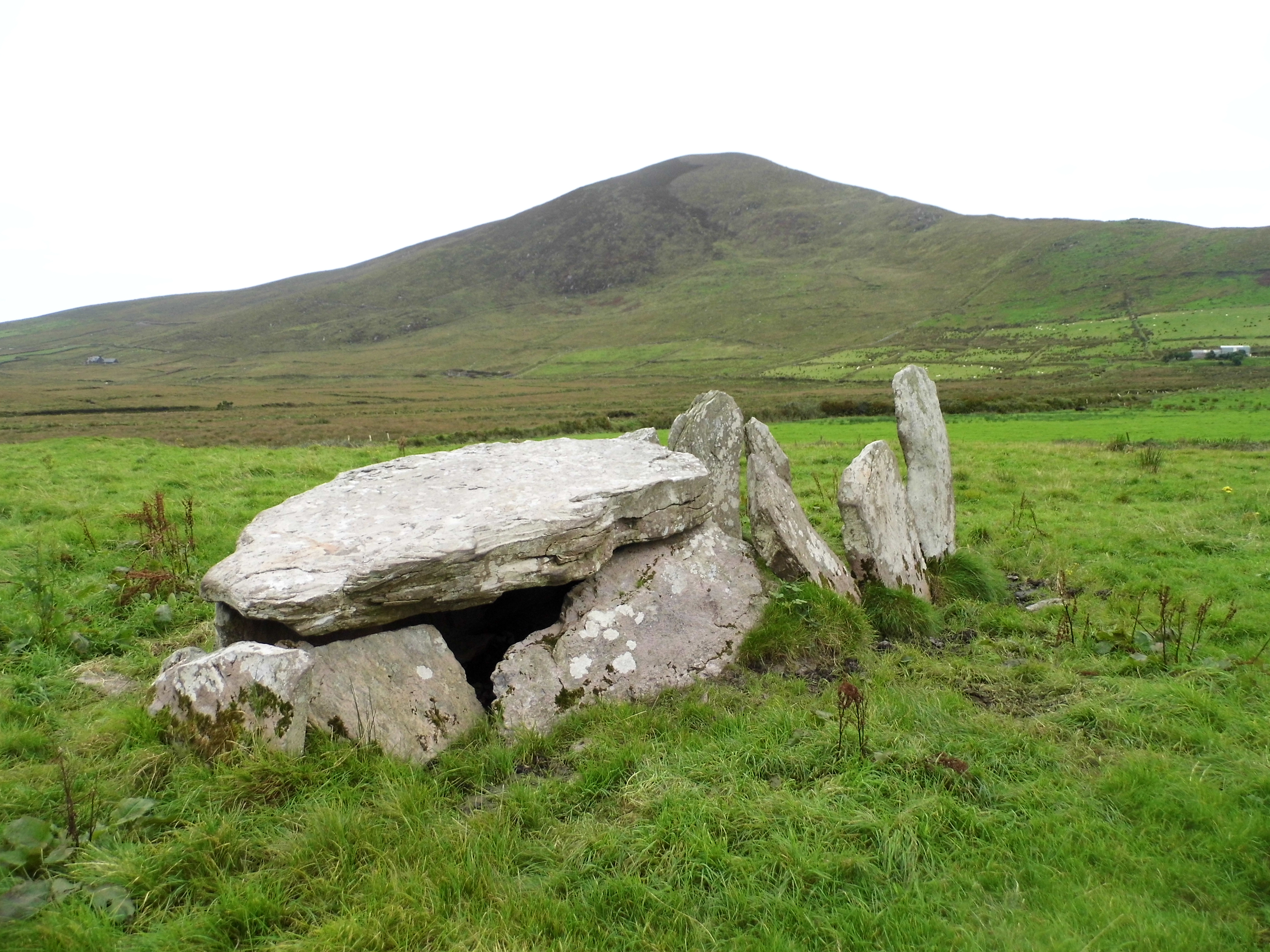
- Viewed from the north-east

- Location in Ireland
- 51°49′24.7″N 10°18′48.9″W
- Type: Tomb
- Periods: Neolithic Age; Bronze Age
- Location: County Kerry, Ireland
- OS grid reference: V 405 659

History
- Built: c. 2500 BC

Site notes
- Material: Stone

Coom Wedge Tomb is a prehistoric site, a wedge tomb on the Iveragh Peninsula in County Kerry, Ireland. It is near the Skellig Ring, a route in the west of the peninsula.

== Description ==
There are around 400 wedge tombs in Ireland. They are a type of gallery grave, and date from the transition between the Neolithic Age and the Bronze Age.

It is aligned west-east, about 5 metres (16 ft) long and 1.5 metres (4 ft 11 in) wide; the entrance is at the west end. The chamber is about 3 metres (9.8 ft) long, covered by a single slab. There is an open antechamber in front of this, with three large stones on each side, the tallest about 1.5 metres (4 ft 11 in) high.

== Legend ==
In The Pursuit of Diarmuid and Gráinne, a story in Irish mythology, Diarmuid Ua Duibhne and Gráinne were pursued by Fionn mac Cumhaill. They hid in caves to evade capture or, where there were no caves, Diarmuid made shelters. Coom Wedge Tomb, being such a shelter, is known as "Diarmuid and Gráinne's Bed", like other wedge tombs in Ireland.

== See also ==
- List of megalithic monuments in Ireland
- Irish megalithic tombs
