= Knockroe Passage Tomb =

Neolithic passage tomb

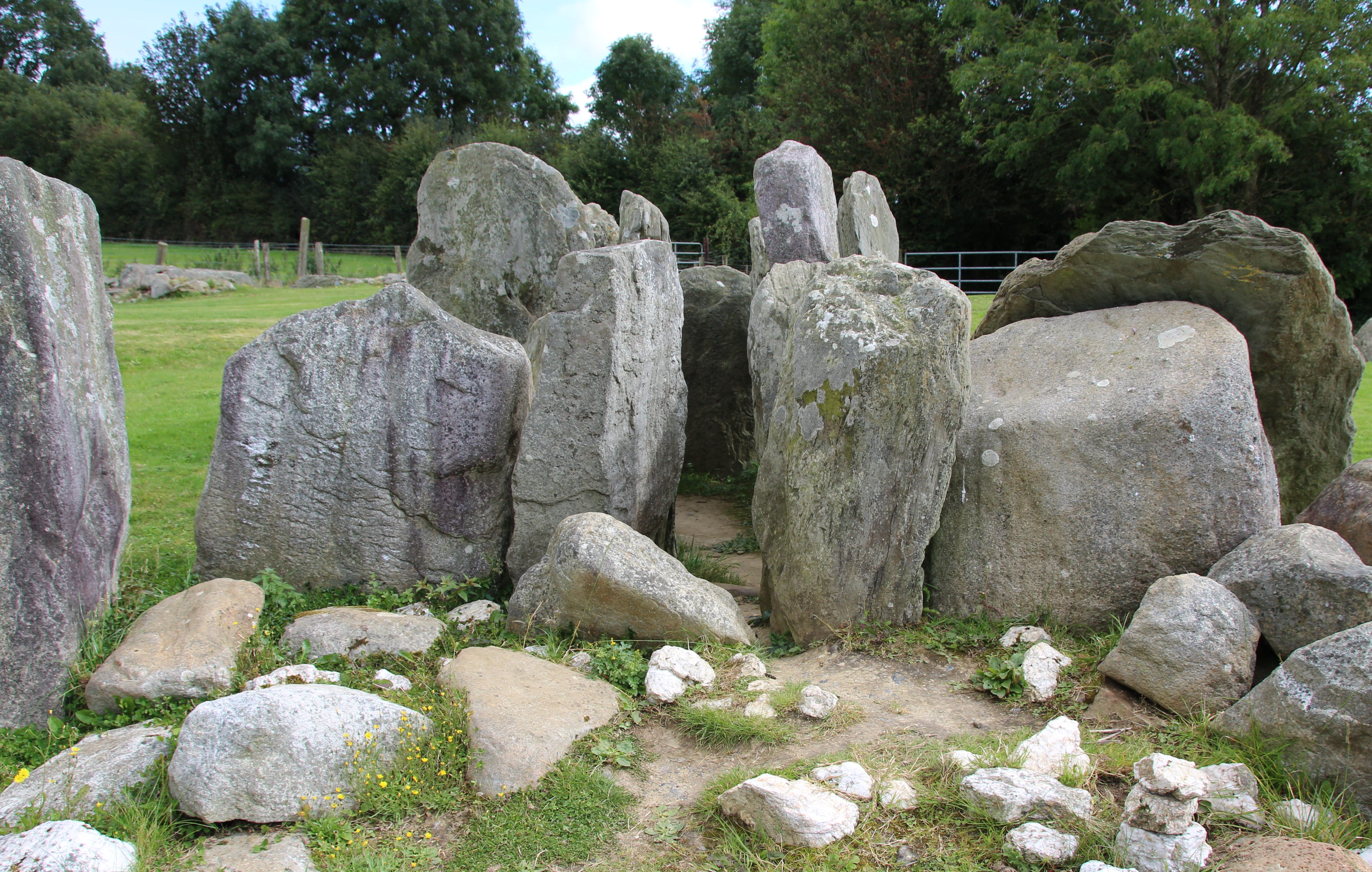
- The western chamber

- Location in Ireland
- 52°25′54″N 7°23′59″W
- Type: Passage tomb
- Periods: Neolithic
- Location: Knockroe, County Kilkenny, Ireland
- OS grid reference: S 408 312

History
- Built: c. 2750 BC

Site notes
- Material: Stone

Knockroe Passage Tomb is a prehistoric site, of the Neolithic period, in the townland of Knockroe in County Kilkenny, Ireland, about 10 km north of Carrick-on-Suir. It is known locally as "The Caiseal".

It is National Monument no. 655, managed by the Office of Public Works on behalf of the state.

== Description ==
There are two chambers on the site: the larger western chamber is aligned so that sunlight at sunset at the winter solstice shines along the passageway. There is artwork on many of the stones lining the passageway. Quartz is scattered around the site: this may have formed a wall at the entrances. The chambers would originally have been covered with earth.

There are similarities with the tombs at Newgrange and Knowth (both in County Meath).

Excavations, led by Muiris O'Sullivan of the Department of Archaeology at University College Dublin, have been conducted for several years at the site.

== See also ==
- List of National Monuments in County Kilkenny
- List of megalithic monuments in Ireland
- Irish megalithic tombs
