= Dooey's Cairn =

Prehistoric site of the Neolithic period

- Ballymacaldrack Court Tomb
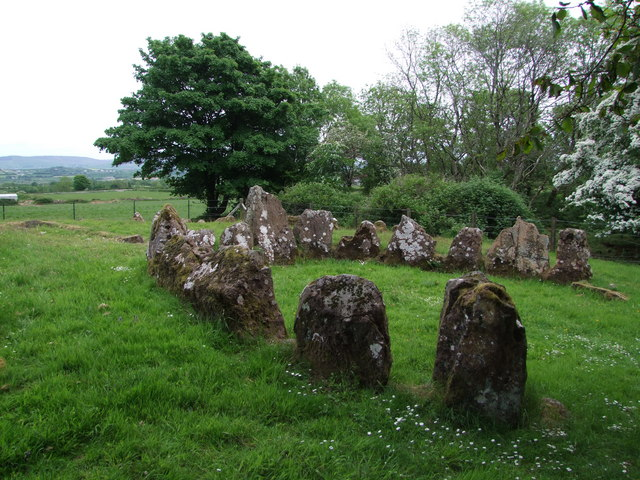
- The cairn in 2008

- Location in Northern Ireland, United Kingdom
- 55°0′5.6″N 6°24′15.8″W
- Type: Court tomb
- Periods: Neolithic
- Location: Northern Ireland, United Kingdom
- OS grid reference: D 021 182

History
- Built: c. 3000 BC

Dooey's Cairn, or Ballymacaldrack Court Tomb, is a prehistoric site of the Neolithic period, situated near Dunloy, in County Antrim, Northern Ireland.

It is named after Andrew Dooey, who owned the land; the monument was granted to the state in 1975 by his family. It is maintained by the Northern Ireland Environment Agency.

== Description ==
Court tombs, or court cairns, are of the Neolithic period (c. 4000 to 2000 BC). There are about 400 in Ireland, and most of them are in the northern half of the island. A court tomb has an open area, bounded by upright slabs or drystone walling, in front of a chamber. It is thought that a ritual or social event took place here.

Dooey's Cairn is well preserved. Court tombs are usually aligned north–south, but here the U-shaped court, defined by eleven upright slabs, faces south-west of a small roofless chamber; two portal stones are at the entrance to the chamber. Excavation in 1935 found polished stone axes beneath the portal stones.

Behind the chamber are two more portal stones leading to a passage, length about 6 metres (20 ft). This "cremation passage", investigated during excavation of 1975, originally had a timber roof and a cobbled floor; it had three pits containing the cremated bones of five or six adult humans. It is the only court cairn in Ireland with a cremation passage.

Four pots found during excavation are now in the Ulster Museum.

== See also ==
- Irish megalithic tombs
- List of megalithic monuments in Ireland
