= Lisnadarragh Wedge Tomb =

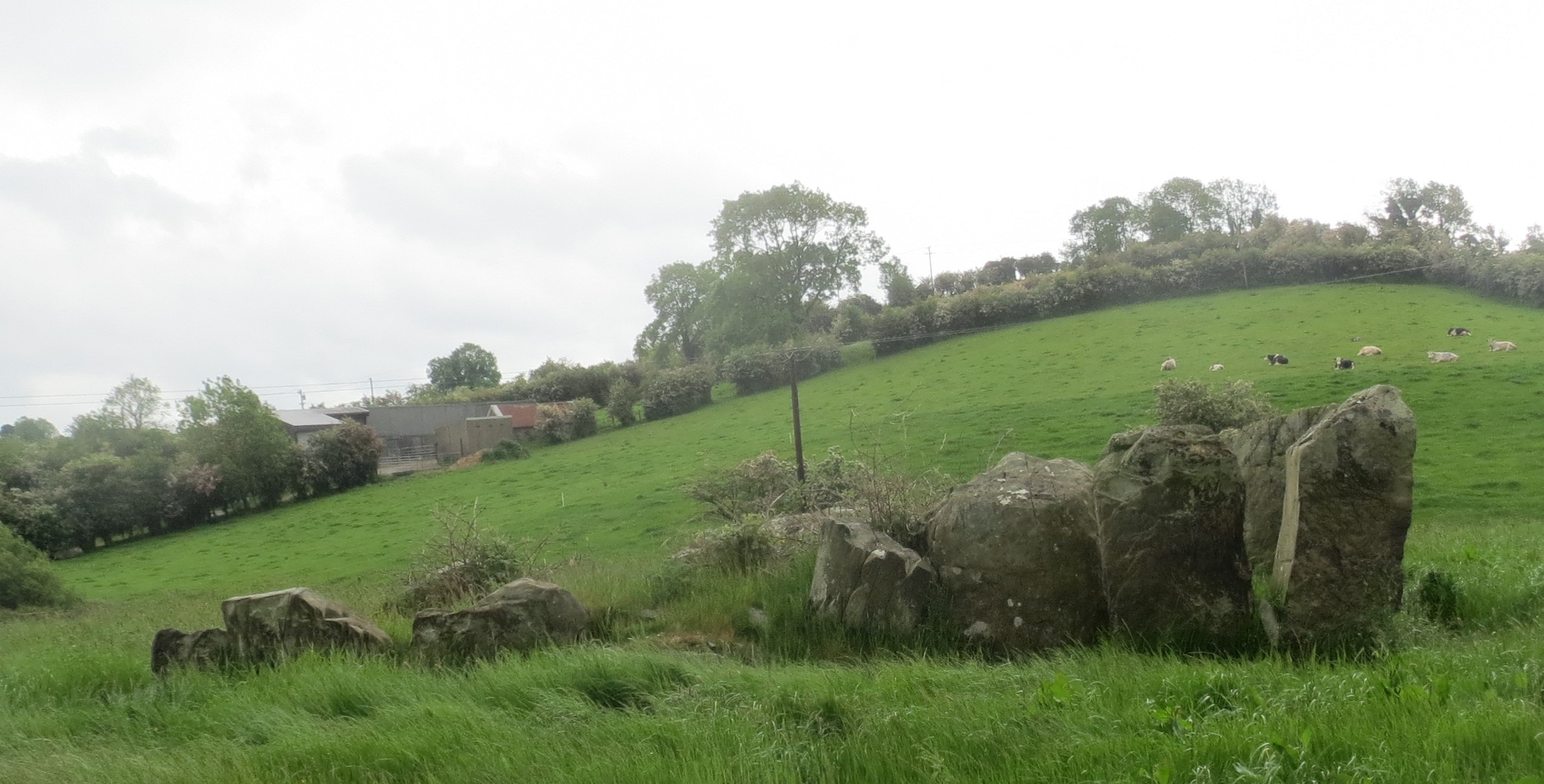
- The tomb in 2021

- Location in Ireland
- 54°0′48″N 6°53′44″W
- Type: Tomb
- Periods: Neolithic Age; Bronze Age
- Location: County Monaghan, Ireland
- OS grid reference: H 724 077

History
- Built: c. 2500 BC

Site notes
- Material: Stone

Lisnadarragh Wedge Tomb is a prehistoric site, a wedge tomb about 16 kilometres (10 mi) west of Carrickmacross, in County Monaghan near the border with County Cavan, in Ireland.

== Description ==
There are about 400 wedge tombs in Ireland. They are a type of gallery grave, and date from the transition between the Neolithic Age and the Bronze Age.

The tomb at Lisnadarragh is aligned roughly north-east to south-west, and measures about 4.5 by 2 metres (14.8 by 6.6 ft). The sides of the tomb are defined by 20 orthostats, which decrease in size from south-west to north-east, the largest, at the entrance, being of height 1.8 metres (5 ft 11 in). It is roofless; a roof slab lies near the gallery.

== See also ==
- List of megalithic monuments in Ireland
- Irish megalithic tombs
