= Hartberg megalithic tomb =

- Steinkiste auf dem Hartberg
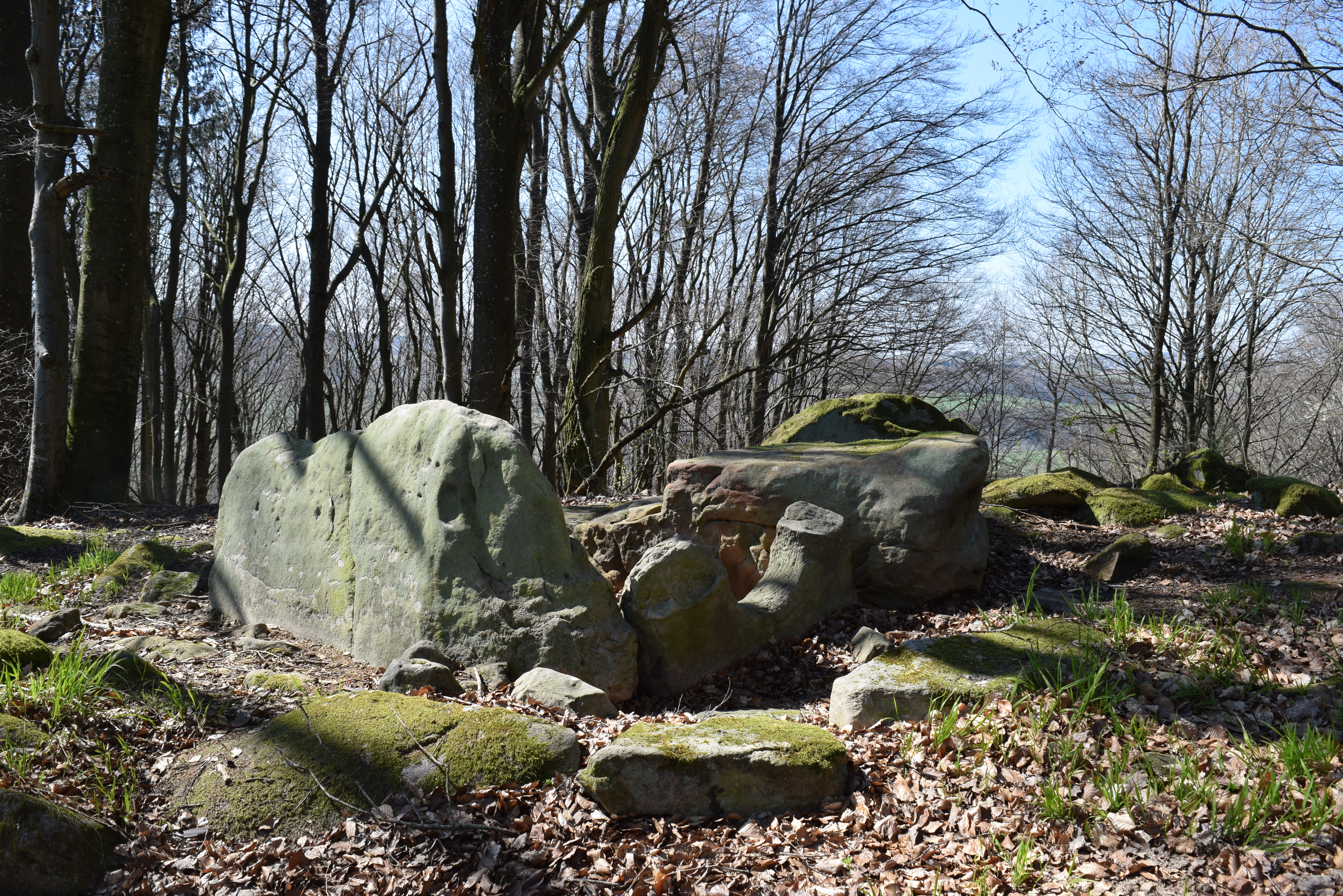
- The tomb in 2020

- Location in Rhineland-Palatinate, Germany
- 49°54′18.3″N 6°23′23.5″E
- Type: Gallery grave
- Periods: Late Neolithic
- Location: Schankweiler, Rhineland-Palatinate, Germany

History
- Built: c. 3000 BC

Site notes
- Material: Sandstone
- Length: c. 2 m (6 ft 7 in)
- Width: c. 1.2 m (3 ft 11 in)

The Hartberg megalithic tomb is an archaeological site of the late Neolithic Age, near Schankweiler and about 10 kilometres (6 mi) south-west of Bitburg, in Rhineland-Palatinate, Germany, near the border with Luxemburg.

== Description ==
The site, on the western slope of the Hartberg north of Schankweiler, dates from around 3000 BC. It is the only Neolithic tomb of this type in Rhineland-Palatiate. It is a gallery grave, with two chambers, formed from sandstone slabs and blocks, the main chamber measuring around 2 by 1.2 metres (6 ft 7 in by 3 ft 11 in). The entrance to the tomb is an incomplete slab with part of a circular opening about 70 centimetres (28 in) in diameter. There is the lower half of a slab separating the main chamber and a poorly preserved antechamber. There were originally roof slabs, and the grave was probably once covered with a mound.

=== Excavation ===
There has been excavation of the site. Bones and pottery sherds were found in the tomb, and flint knives, flint arrowheads and pottery sherds were discovered outside; these suggested a date of about 3000 BC. There was a small beaker in the tomb, with "barbed-wire" decoration, of the early Bronze Age, suggesting that the site was in use, perhaps with interruptions, for around 1,000 years. A long stone stele was found in the tomb, which may have stood above the mound.

Slabs from the tomb were later used in the early Iron Age to build a house nearby. During the Roman period or later there was quarrying from the rocky ground that forms the western wall of the tomb.
