= Clachan =

Type of small settlement in Ireland

A clachan (Irish: clochán [ˈkl̪ˠɔxaːnˠ] or clachan [ˈkl̪ˠaxənˠ]; Scottish Gaelic: clachan [ˈkʰl̪ˠaxan]; Manx: claghan [ˈkʰlaxan]) is a small settlement or hamlet on the island of Ireland, the Isle of Man, and Scotland.

== History ==
Many clachans date to the Middle Ages or earlier. Although some became kirktowns, most were small settlements, lacking a kirk, a fortified house, or any formal building, and were not connected to the outside world by a road, simply a cluster of small thatched single-storey cottages and outbuildings of farmers and/or fishermen, with footpaths running between them, often found on poorer land and related to the rundale or run rig systems of farming. The households needed to be within shouting distance of each other and of their beasts, and buildings were added as needed. Typically, nothing faced a road, as there was no road.

In most of Scotland, from the Hebrides to the Borders, clachans were the usual form of rural settlement until the 18th century. Then, at the time of the Highland Clearances, many landowners began laying out planned villages, with a main street, plots of the same width, and houses in a line, often built to house tenants who had been moved off the land and were intended to weave or make things instead of farming.

According to David Lloyd, the Great Famine in Ireland (1845–49) caused such disruption to the social system that the clachans there virtually disappeared.

In some cases, clachans have evolved into holiday villages, or one or two houses have taken over, turning smaller houses into agricultural outhouses. Remains can be seen in many upland and coastal areas. Some are clustered in a dip in the landscape, to protect from Atlantic winds, but others stretch haphazardly along main roads.

== Etymology ==
The word is composed of two elements, clach/cloch meaning "stone" and the masculine diminutive suffix -an/-án. It originally denoted one of two things:

- a monastic stone-cell (clochán).
- a paved road or causeway which in the earliest period were most commonly found leading to or from a church or cell

This should not be confused with the Scottish Gaelic plural of clach which is clachan "stones", a homonym.

== Examples ==
=== Ireland ===
- Cloghane in County Kerry
- Cloghan, County Offaly
- Cloghan, County Donegal
- Cloghanmore in County Donegal
- Menlo/Mionloch in Galway

In the meaning of "causeway", the most prominent example in Irish is the Giant's Causeway, known in Irish as Clochán an Aifir or Clochán na bhFomhórach.

=== Scotland ===
In Scotland, clachans can be found in Argyll and Bute, Highland Perthshire and in the Highland Council region but also elsewhere, for example:

- Clachan, Cowal, Argyll and Bute
- Clachan, Lismore, Argyll and Bute
- Clachan, Kintyre, Argyll and Bute
- Clachan, Ross and Cromarty, Highland
- Clachan, Skye, Highland
- Clachan, Sutherland, Highland
- Clachan, Raasay on the Isle of Raasay, Highland
- Clachan, South Uist, Outer Hebrides
- Clachan of Campsie
- Clachan of Glendaruel in Argyll
- Clachaneasy in Galloway
- Hessilhead in North Ayrshire
- Bloak in East Ayrshire
- Ladeside in East Ayrshire
- Damnaglaur in the Rinns of Galloway

=== Other ===
- Clachan, Ontario, Canada
