= Richard Lapp =

Irish religious figure

Richard Lapp was Archdeacon of Cork from 1688 until 1690.

Lapp was born in Bandon, County Cork and educated at Trinity College, Dublin. He held incumbencies at Templequinlan and Rathclarin. He was also Prebendary of Templebryan in Ross Cathedral from 1686 to 1687; and Treasurer of Cork from 1687 to 1688.
