= Knockmaree Dolmen =

Prehistoric site in Dublin, Ireland

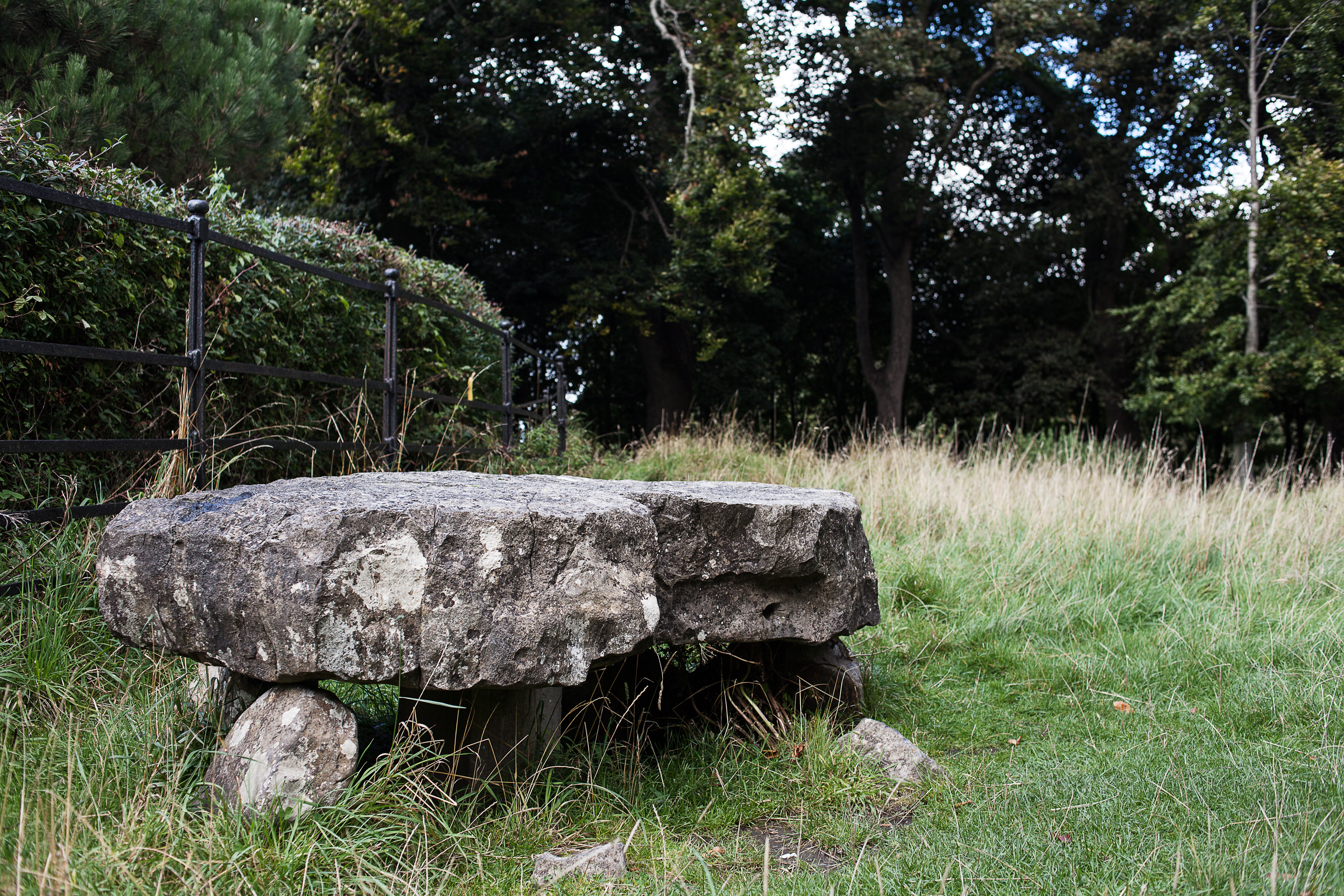

- Location within Ireland
- 53°21′3″N 6°20′26″W
- Periods: Neolithic
- Location: Phoenix Park, near Dublin
- OS grid reference: O 10 34

Knockmaree Dolmen, or Knockmaree Cist, is a prehistoric site of the Neolithic period, in Phoenix Park just north of Chapelizod, near Dublin, Ireland. Other forms of the name are Knockmary or Knockmaroon Dolmen, or Cnoc-Maraidhe.

== Description ==
The tomb, situated on a small ridge, is a cist, a type of burial chamber found in Ireland on the south and east coast. It dates from about 3000 B.C. to 2500 B.C. A capstone, measuring 1.96 metres (6 ft 5 in) by 1.05 metres (3 ft 5 in), is supported by smaller stones. The capstone is water-worn, and is thought to have come from the River Liffey nearby.

It was discovered in 1838, when workmen were employed to remove a tumulus of height 15 feet (4.6 m) and circumference 120 feet (37 m). In the centre of the mound were found the stones now visible; four other cists were found in the outer area.

The remains were examined by the Royal Irish Academy, the Academy's report later being delivered by George Petrie.

In the central burial chamber, measuring 1.20 metres (3 ft 11 in) by 0.60 metres (2 ft 0 in), two male skeletons were found in a crouched position. They were almost complete and aged about 40 and 50 years. Grave goods were found including many small perforated sea-shells (the flat periwinkle, Littorina obtusata), which presumably formed a necklace, and a flint knife. In the outer cists, an urn and food vessels were found, with fragments of burnt bone and ashes.

The tomb is known as a "Linkardstown burial", after a megalithic grave found in the townland of Linkardstown, south-east of Carlow. There is a group of such burials, having mounds of similar size and situated on a hilltop or similar location.

The tomb was repaired in 1973 and in the 1990s, including the addition of a concrete block to support the capstone.

== Damage ==
In the 1970s the tomb was damaged by fire which resulted in cracks in the capstone. These were subsequently fixed with concrete.

In early 2023, the tomb was further damaged with a part of the capstone broken off. Tire tracks around the tomb indicate it may have been struck by machinery. The Office of Public Works stated that the damage had resulted from the failure of the earlier repairs. Since the 1990s, requests have been made to further protect the site with fencing and signage.

== See also ==
- Irish megalithic tombs
- List of megalithic monuments in Ireland
