= Ballyalton Court Cairn =

Gravesite in Northern Ireland

Coordinates: 54.3288°N 5.6463°W

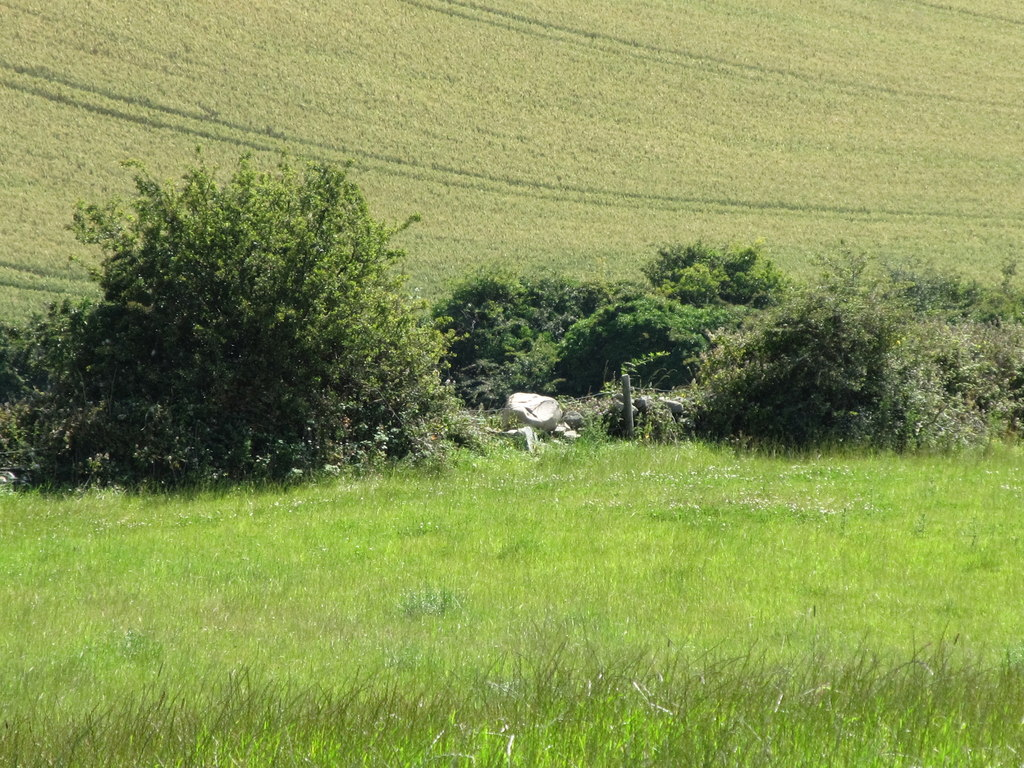
Photo taken in 2011.

Ballyalton Court Cairn is a single court grave situated on a rock outcrop by the roadside 0.5 miles from Ballyalton village, which is 2.25 miles east of Downpatrick, County Down, Northern Ireland, at grid ref 531 448. The tomb contained human bones, flint implements and pottery now known as Ballyalton bowls.
