= Glantane East =

Megalithic complex in County Cork, Ireland

Coordinates: 52.004426°N 9.04485°W

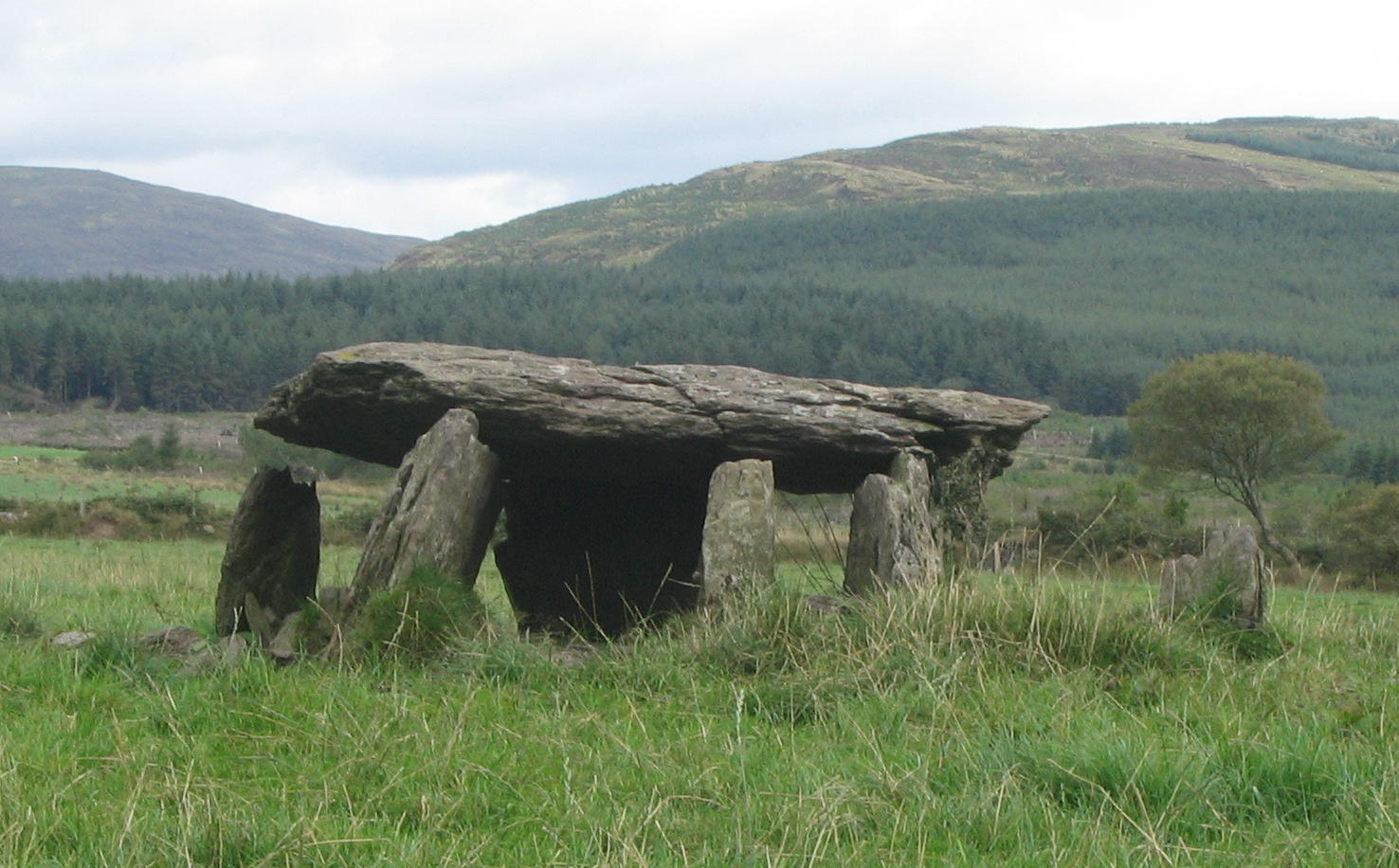
Wedge tomb at Glantane

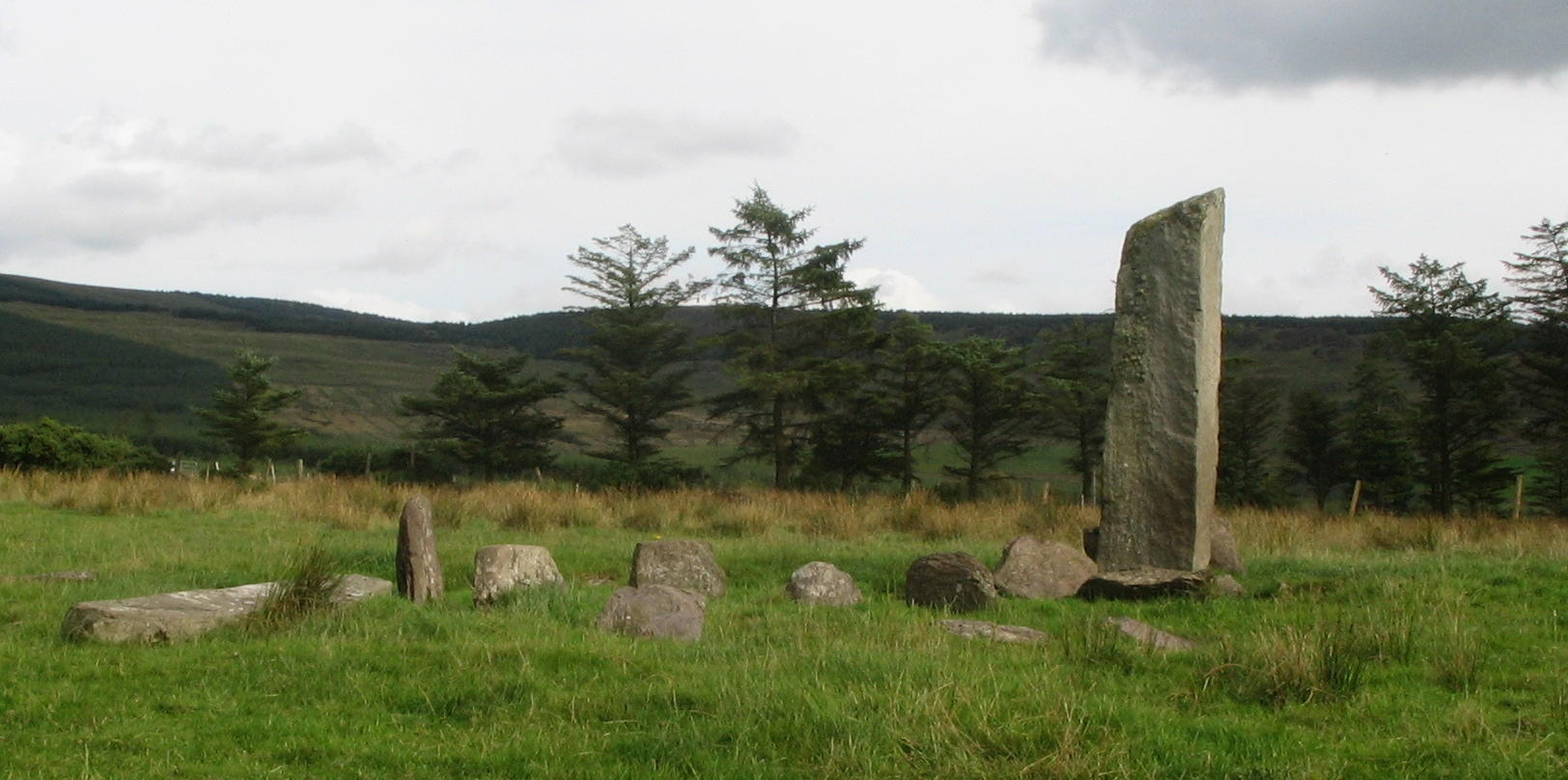
Standing stone at Glantane

Glantane East (An Gleanntán Thoir) is a megalithic complex situated 6.4 kilometres (4.0 mi) from Millstreet, County Cork, Ireland. It is set in the Keel River valley on the north-west upper slopes of Musherabeg mountain, in the townland of Glantane. The complex includes a wedge tomb, two stone circles (one with 11 stones) and a pair of stone alignments.

One of the slabs from the larger stone circle has fallen.

== See also ==
- List of megalithic monuments in Ireland

== Sources ==
- De Valera, Ruaidhri. Survey of the Megalithic Tombs of Ireland: County Clare. Dublin: The Stationery Office, 1961.
