= Templebryan Stone Circle =

Stone circle in County Cork, Ireland

Coordinates: 51.643162°N 8.883359°W

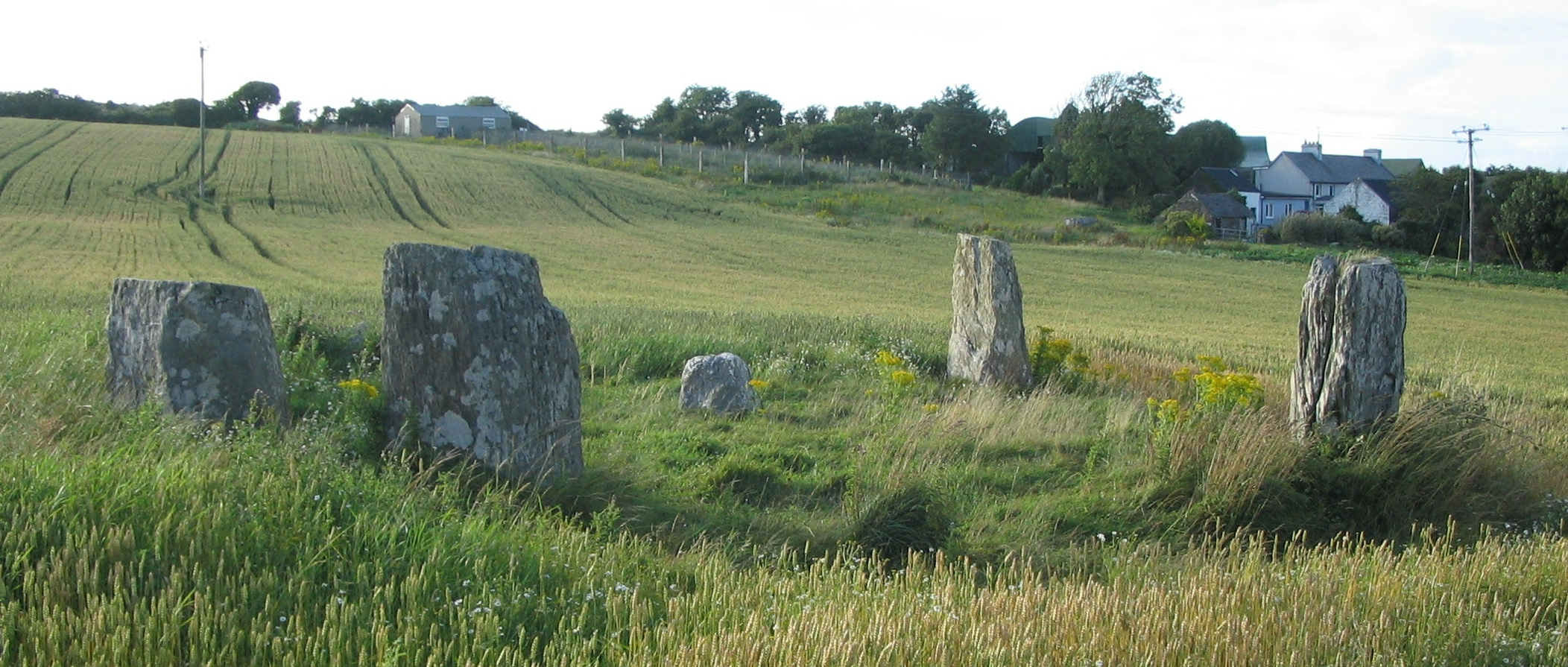
Templebryan. Nine stones were recorded as standing in the eighteenth century. Today only four are still upright

Templebryan Stone Circle (also known as The Druid's Temple) is a stone circle, located 2.5 km (1.6 mi) north of Clonakilty, County Cork, Ireland. Grid ref: W386 438. Close by lies an Early Christian site. Today there are only four upright stones of the original nine. It is probable that many more upright stones were on this site. Nearby are the remains of a small, ruined church beside another upright stone with a bullaun.

== See also ==
- List of megalithic monuments in Cork
