= Cloghanmore =

Megalithic court cairn in Ireland

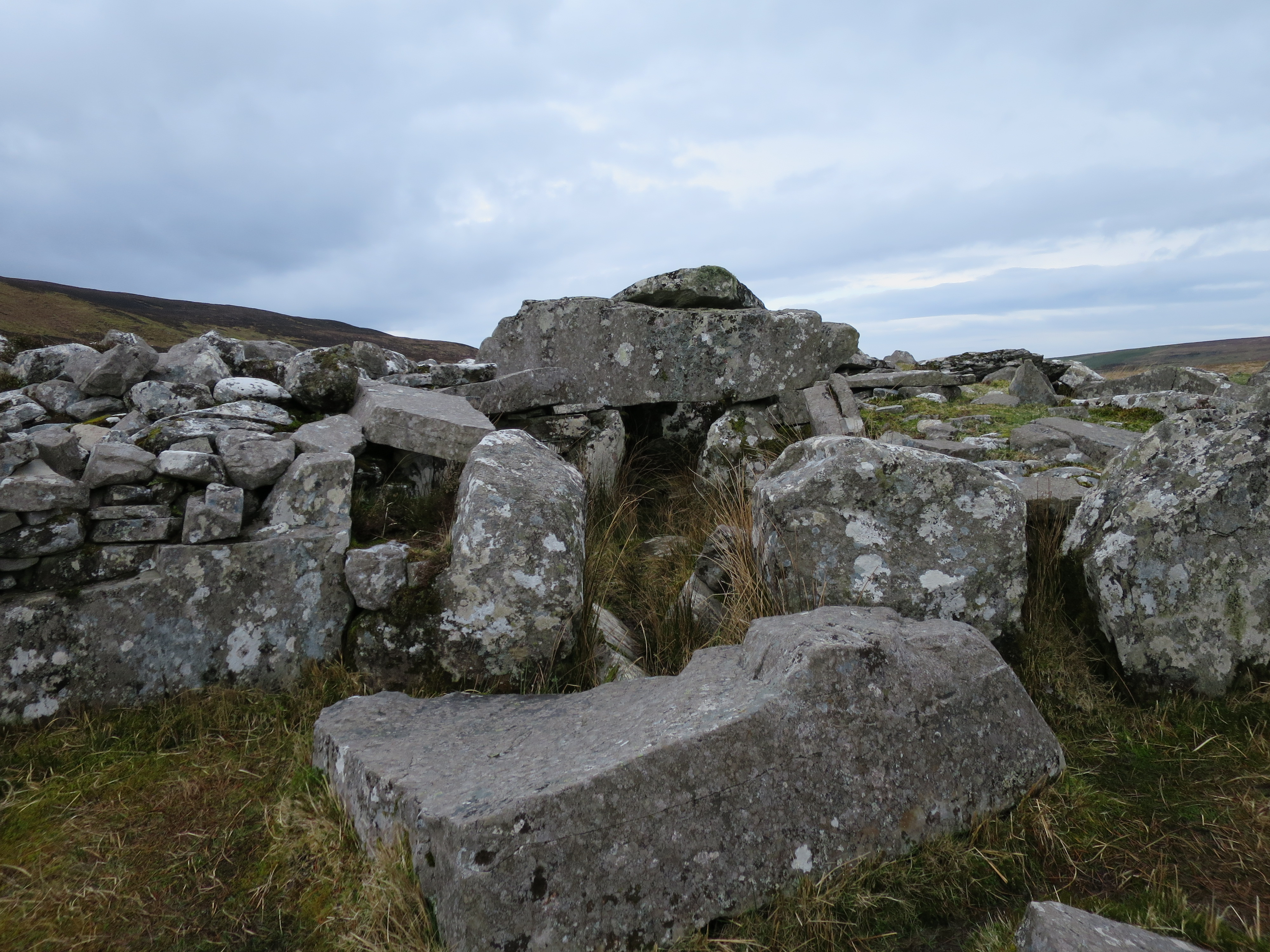
- The tomb in 2016
- Interactive map of Cloghanmore
- 54°41′21″N 8°44′45″W
- Type: Tomb
- Location: Glencolmcille, County Donegal, Ireland

History
- Built: c. 2500 BC

Site notes
- Material: Stone

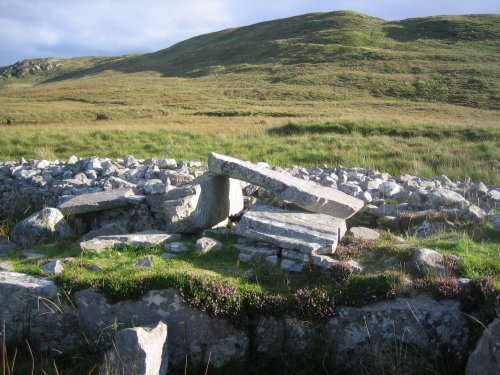
View of western galleries from the north. Note large capstone.

Cloghanmore (translated as "the great stone heap" is a megalithic chamber tomb of the court tomb (or court cairn) type located about 8 km east from Carrick in Malin More, Glencolmcille, in County Donegal, Ireland.

== Features ==
Located near the head of a valley Cloghanmore consists of a double trapezoid shaped tomb that was unearthed from the peat in the 19th century. The tomb is oriented east to west, with the main entrance located on the eastern end. It is a large tomb, with parallel twin galleries to either side of the entrance. There are two western galleries each divided into two chambers by jamb stones with carved ornament. One of the two western galleries is topped with a large capstone. The court space measures approximately 36 X 46 ft with a single chamber on each side. Both chambers have a decorated orthostat on the right side of their entrances. This configuration, with two galleries located side by side across from the entrance and looking into a central full court, is considered unusual.
