= Kilmogue Portal Tomb =

- Leac an Scail; Cill Mhóg (Irish)
- Kilmogue Dolmen; Harristown Dolmen; Cromlech of Kilmogue
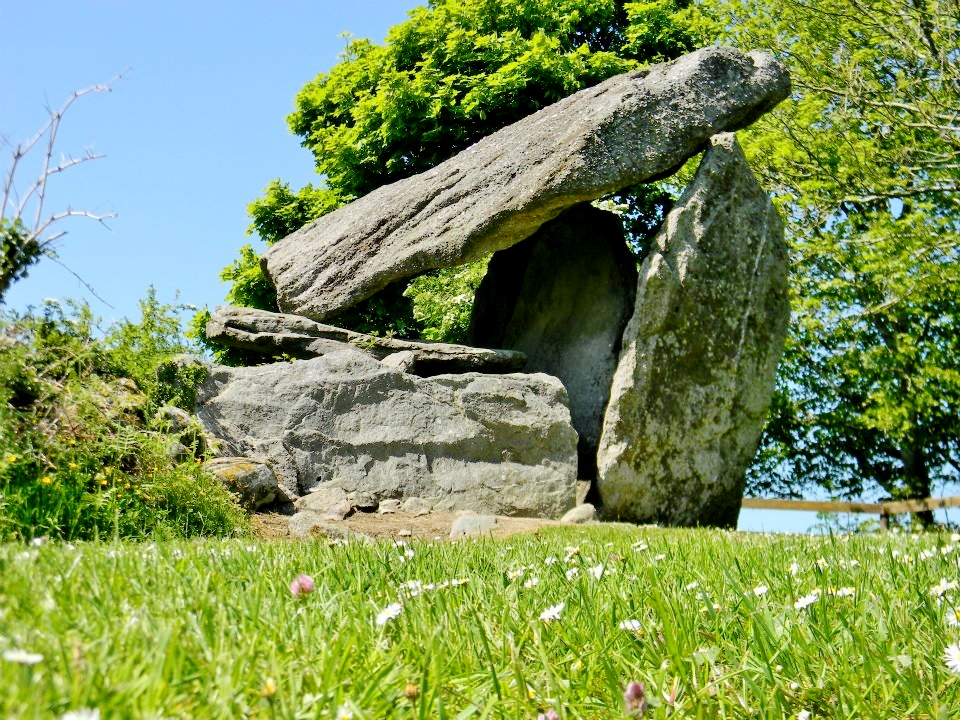
- The dolmen in 2015

- Location in Ireland
- 52.403143°N 7.262261°W
- Type: dolmen
- Location: County Kilkenny, Ireland

History
- Built: c. 3000 BC

Site notes
- Elevation: 165 m (541 ft)
- Height: 4 m (13 ft)
- Area: Nore Valley

National monument of Ireland
- Official name: Kilmogue (Leacán Scoil)
- Reference no.: 324

Kilmogue Portal Tomb, also called Leac an Scail, is a dolmen (portal tomb) and National Monument located in County Kilkenny, Ireland.

== Location ==
Kilmogue Portal Tomb stands on the eastern slopes of Brown Mountain, 7.2 km (4.5 mi) northeast of Mullinavat.

== History ==
Most dolmens were built c. 3000 BC, i.e. in the Neolithic. They may not have been graves; their exact purpose is unknown.

The name "Kilmogue" derives its name from the Irish Cill Mhóg, likely a church founded by or named for St. Mogue.

Another name is Leac an Scail, "the hero's stone." Scal literally means "burst", and scal ghréine (sunburst) is used to refer to the mythological warriors the Fianna. This could also be Leac an Scáil meaning "the stone of the shadow or ghost" or "the phantom's stone".

== Description ==
The dolmen is constructed of granite with quartz veins, using a large capstone resting on two large portal stones and a pillow stone resting on a backstone. The entrance faces northeast, i.e. towards the summer solstice sunrise, and has a door-stone.
