= Passage grave =

Type of megalithic tomb

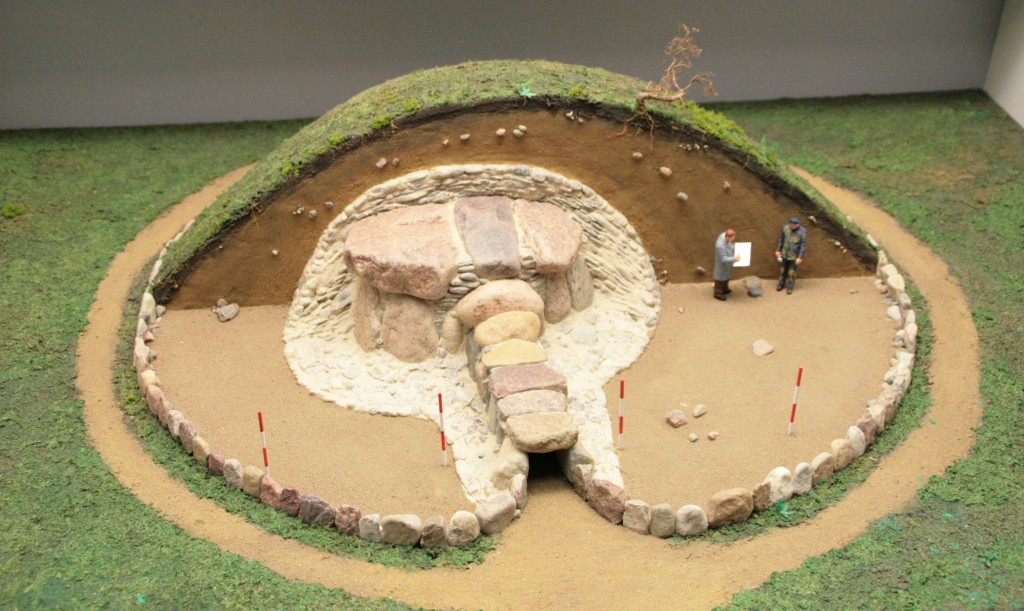
A cutaway view model of a passage tomb

A passage grave or passage tomb consists of one or more burial chambers covered in earth or stone and having a narrow access passage made of large stones. These structures usually date from the Neolithic Age and are found largely in Western Europe. When covered in earth, a passage grave is a type of burial mound which is found in various forms all over the world. When a passage grave is covered in stone, it is a type of cairn.

== Construction and design ==
The building of passage graves was normally carried out with megaliths along with smaller stones. The earliest passage tombs seem to take the form of small dolmens, although not all dolmens are passage graves. The passage itself in a number of notable instances is aligned in such a way that the sun shines through the passage and into the chamber at a significant point in the year, often at sunrise on the winter solstice or at sunset on the equinox. Many later passage tombs were constructed at the tops of hills or mountains, indicating that their builders intended them to be seen from a great distance.

The interior of passage graves varies in number of burials, shape, and other aspects. Those with more than one chamber may have multiple sub-chambers leading off from the main burial chamber. One common interior layout, the cruciform passage grave, is cross-shaped, although prior to the Christian Era and thus having no Christian associations. Some passage tombs are covered with a cairn, especially those Passage tombs of the cairn type often have elaborate corbelled roofs rather than simple slabs. Megalithic art has been identified carved into the stones at some sites. Not all passage "graves" have been found to contain evidence that they were used for burial. One such example is Maeshowe.

== Origins and distribution ==
The passage tomb tradition is believed to have originated in the French region of Brittany. It was introduced to other regions such as Ireland by colonists from Brittany.

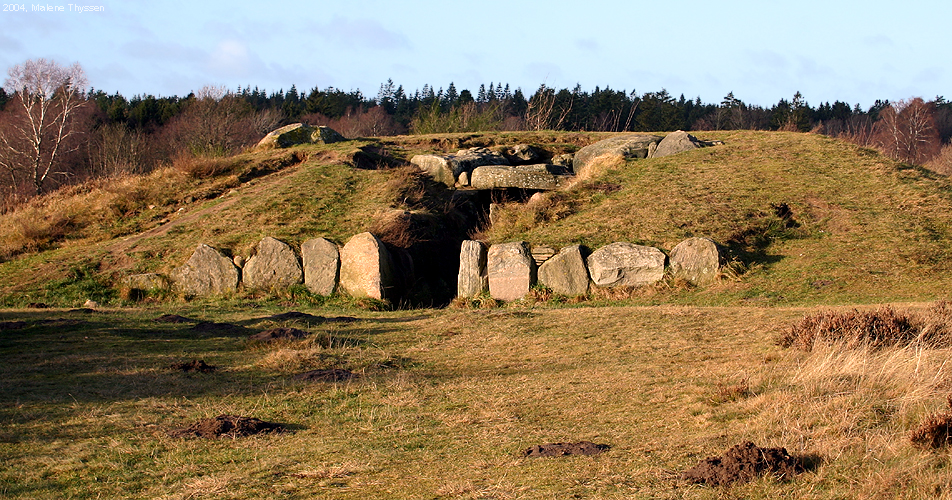
Tustrup-dysserne, the largest passage grave in Eastern Jutland, is an example of Funnelbeaker culture circa 3200 BC.

In a 1961 survey of megalithic tombs in Ireland, Irish scholars Seán Ó Nualláin and Rúaidhrí de Valera describe four categories of megalithic tombs: court cairns, portal dolmens, wedge-shaped gallery graves, and passage tombs. This appears to be one of the first uses of the term. It is likely that the writers borrowed from the Spanish term tumbas de corredor, "corridor tombs", which is used for tombs in Cantabria, Galicia and the Basque Country. Of the megalithic tombs in Ireland, only passage tombs appear to have widespread distribution throughout Europe.

Passage graves are distributed extensively in lands along the Atlantic seaboard of Europe. They are found in Ireland, Britain, Scandinavia, northern Germany and the Drenthe area of the Netherlands. They are also found in Iberia, some parts of the Mediterranean, and along the northern coast of Africa. In Ireland and Britain, passage tombs are often found in large clusters, giving rise to the term passage tomb cemeteries.

== See also ==
- Passage tombs in Ireland
- Entrance grave
- Chambered cairn
- Kofun
