= Irish megalithic tombs =

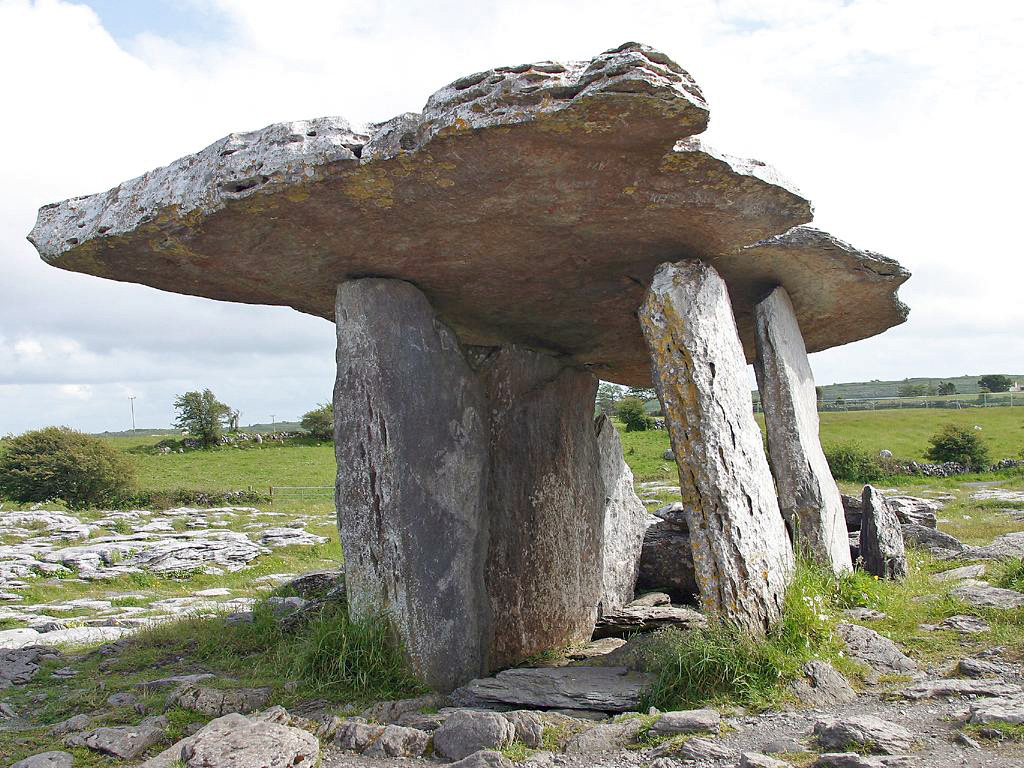
Poulnabrone dolmen is an example of a portal tomb in the west of Ireland

Megalithic monuments in Ireland typically represent one of several types of megalithic tombs: court cairns, passage tombs, portal tombs and wedge tombs. The remains of over 1,000 such megalithic tombs have been recorded around Ireland.

== Types ==
=== Court tombs ===
These tombs have an open east-facing entrance court which leads into a number of rectangular chambers (up to four). The chambers are roofed on the inside by corbelling. Each of these chambers may contain inhumations and cremated remains. Surrounding these chambers is a low dry stone wall with orthostats at the extremities. Sometimes they are called a lobster-claw cairn

=== Passage tombs ===
The passage tomb is a large mound of earth or stone with a narrow passage leading from outside to a central chamber or chambers. Examples of this type include Newgrange, Knowth, and Dowth.

=== Portal tombs ===
Portal tombs (often referred to as dolmens) are mainly located in the northern half of the country. Such tombs have a straight sided chamber often narrowed at the rear. The entrance is marked by tall portal stones. On top lies a huge single cap stone resting on the portal stones on the front and sloping at the rear where it rests on the backstone. In the majority of cases the tomb entrance faces the east towards the sunrise. This is not always the case though as many tombs face different directions. Examples of portal tombs include Kilmogue, County Kilkenny; Poulnabrone in the Burren, County Clare; and Knockeen, County Waterford.

=== Wedge tombs ===
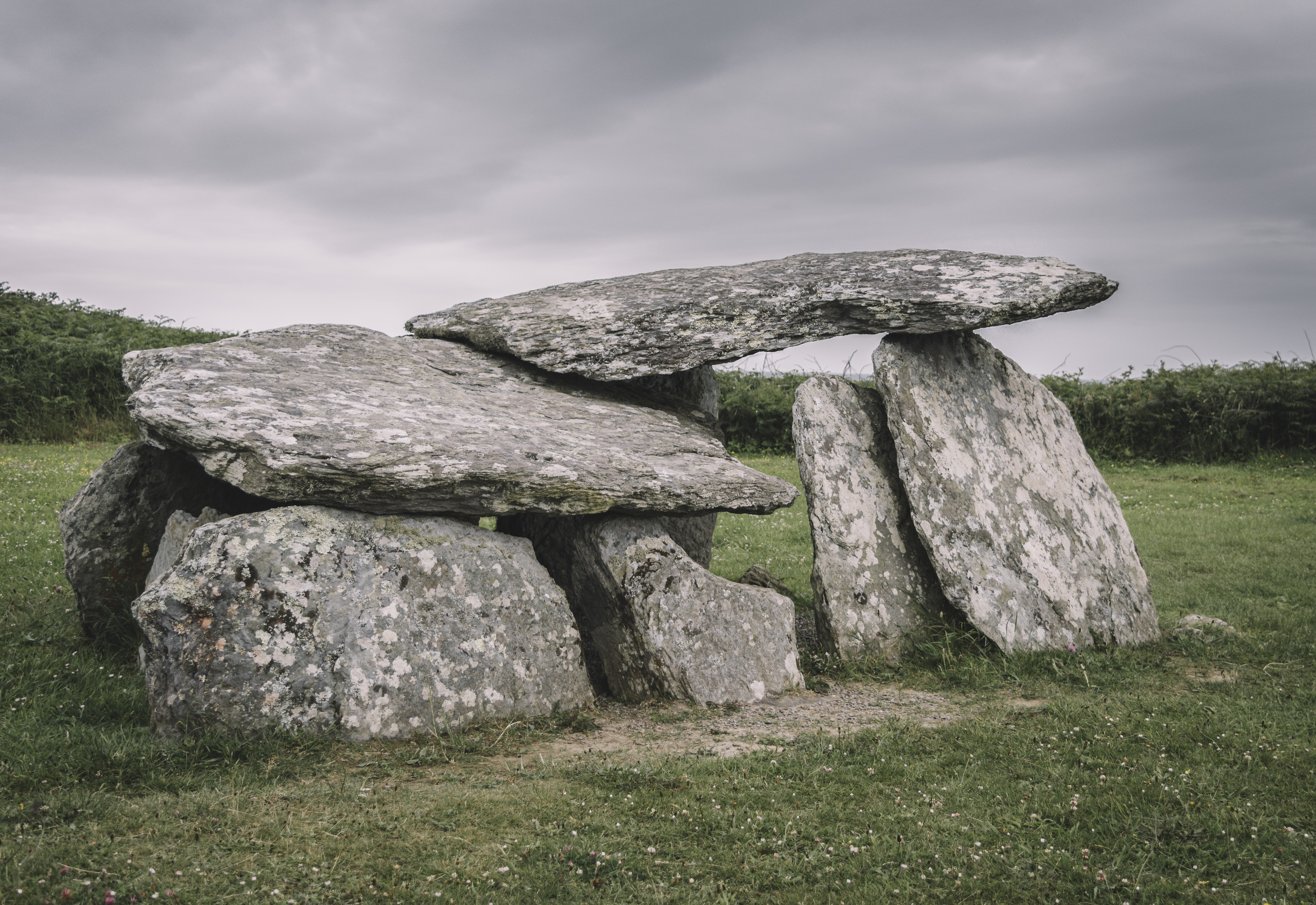
Altar Wedge Tomb near Schull in County Cork

These tombs are generally found in the west and north west of Ireland. Their sloping roof and narrowing walls at one end produce their characteristic wedge shape.

== Distribution by province ==
The number and location of tombs in each province of Ireland are recorded by the Irish National Monument Service (Republic of Ireland) and in the Northern Ireland Sites & Monuments Record (Northern Ireland). The distribution of each type of tomb, by province, can be summarised as:

	Court Tomb	Passage Tomb	Portal Tomb	Wedge Tomb
Leinster	11	83	24	19
Munster	7	9	21	337
Connacht	197	90	44	125
Ulster	185	37	96	88

Many hundreds of other "unclassified" megalithic tombs and sites are also recorded.
