= Court cairn =

Type of chamber tomb found in Ireland and Scotland

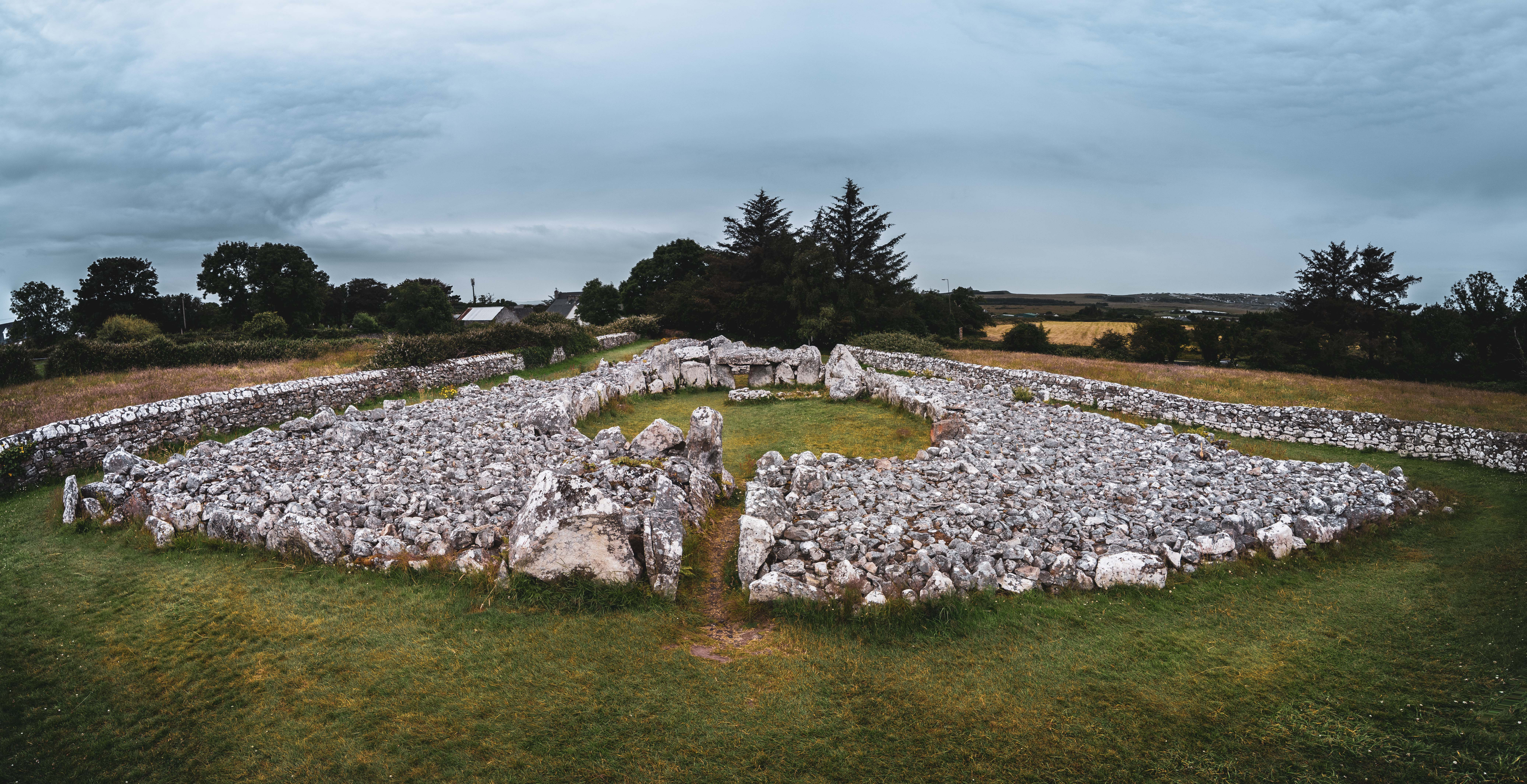
Creevykeel Court Tomb.

The court cairn or court tomb is a megalithic type of chambered cairn or gallery grave. During the period, 3900–3500 BC, more than 390 court cairns were built in Ireland and over 100 in southwest Scotland. The Neolithic (New Stone Age) monuments are identified by an uncovered courtyard connected to one or more roofed and partitioned burial chambers. Many monuments were built in multiple phases in both Ireland and Scotland and later re-used in the Early Bronze Age.

== Construction and design ==
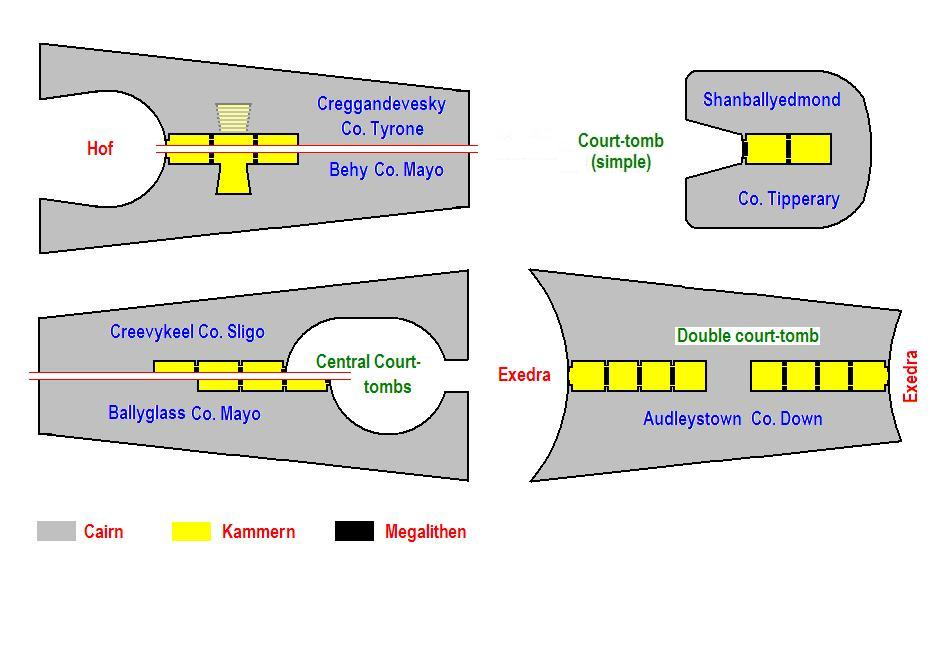
Various forms of court tombs.

Court cairns are characterized as having an uncovered courtyard area connected to one or more covered burial chambers. The boundaries of this open area were typically lined with large standing stones. A narrow, stone-lined entry extended from the main area into one or more roofed burial chambers. Courtyards were generally oval or circular in shape, with U-shaped and semi-circular courtyards being the most common layout. Large standing stones were used to make the walls and roof of burial chambers, normally located at one end of the cairn. Burial chambers are typically divided by jamb stones or jamb-and-sill stones into consecutive burial compartments.

There are variations in the court cairn layout in both Ireland and Scotland. Most examples have a single courtyard connected by one burial tomb or a courtyard connected to two burial tombs, located on opposite ends of the court area. In Ireland, there are also instances of layouts with dual tombs, each with its own courtyard, but both sharing a common burial mound. The court cairn is also found in Western Scotland. The similar layout of tombs found in Ireland and Scotland and the close geographical location of these tombs, separated by the narrow Irish Channel, indicates that these populations moved back and forth on a regular basis between the two countries.

== History ==
The earliest megalithic tombs found in Britain, Scotland and Ireland were constructed in early 4th millennium BC. The first burial monuments in these areas were most likely single chamber dolmens surrounded by large standing stones. A few dolmens can be dated in both Wales and Ireland from 3800 to 3500 BC. During the same period, passage graves were being developed throughout Ireland, southwest Britain, the Hebrides and the Orkney Islands. Court cairns are unique to Ireland and Scotland. Radiocarbon dating indicates that the earliest court cairns were built around 3750 and new monuments continued to be built and existing ones enlarged until 2900 BC.

=== Court cairns in Ireland ===
There are over 390 court cairns recorded in Ireland, with a majority of monuments found in the northern third of the island. Irish court cairns have a few variations in layout. Most examples have a single courtyard connected by one burial tomb chamber or a single courtyard connected to a single burial tomb on each end. In Ireland, there are also instances of layouts with dual tombs, each with their own courtyard, but both share a common burial mound and centre court tombs. Most tombs in Ireland are positioned facing east. Less than 40 tombs have been fully excavated to date, and at the majority of sites, at least one cremated individual has been found. In the Audsleystown dual court tomb in County Down, Ireland, the remains of 34 people were found in the burial chamber.

Court cairns are found north of a line crossing Ireland from the Burren to the Cooley peninsula. Court cairns are scattered densely across this area of Ireland and Northern Ireland. Thirty percent of all Irish neolithic monuments are court cairns. The court cairn at Creevykeel in County Sligo was the first court cairn to be excavated in Ireland by archaeologists from Harvard University in 1935. They determined that the Neolithic era in Ireland began in 3900 BC, more than 100 years before the first appearance of court tombs. They also suggested that court tombs were widely re-used during the Early Bronze Age. Excavations of court tombs yielded deposits of cremated and unburnt human bone, round-bottomed bowls, flat-bottomed pottery vessels, flint, polished axes and stone beads.

=== Court cairns in Scotland ===
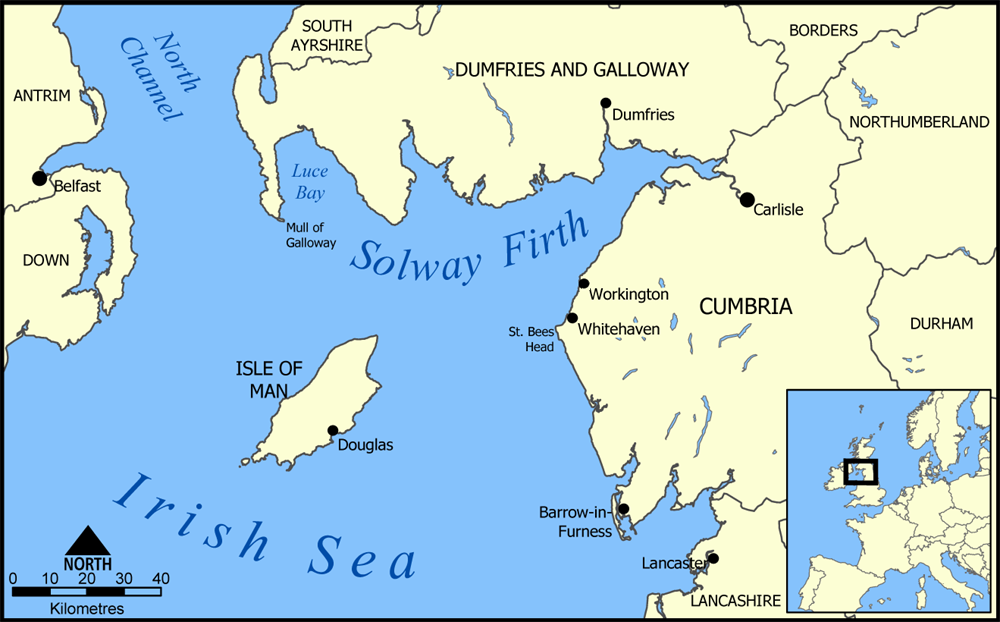
Map of the Solway Firth

Burial tombs in Scotland are known as Clyde cairns or Clyde-Carlingford cairns. Generally considered to be the earliest chambered cairns in Scotland, more than 100 Clyde cairns have been found to date. The "Clyde" name is derived from the first discovery of courtyard type burial monuments in the Firth of Clyde region of southwest Scotland. The ancient monuments are distributed from the Solway Firth area north to the southern Hebrides, in the counties of Argyll and Dumfries and Galloway. A few Clyde Cairns have been recorded in North Uist in the Outer Hebrides.

Clyde cairns found in Scotland are identified by an open courtyard area surrounded with large stone slabs and attached to one or more roofed burial chamber areas. The burial chamber was often placed at one end of a rectangular or trapezoidal cairn, and was usually divided into separate burial compartments. Previous excavations suggest that these chambers were entered by removing the stone roof slabs. In some areas, Clyde cairns have one or more lateral chambers. The majority of these monuments were sited to have views over hills or mountains and over water. Many are situated alongside lochs. These monuments were often built in multiple phases. Only a few of the Clyde cairns have been fully excavated. Burnt human bone has been found in many Clyde burial chambers. Bowl pottery remnants have also been found. The tombs saw re-use of their burial chambers in the Early Bronze Age.

== Gallery ==
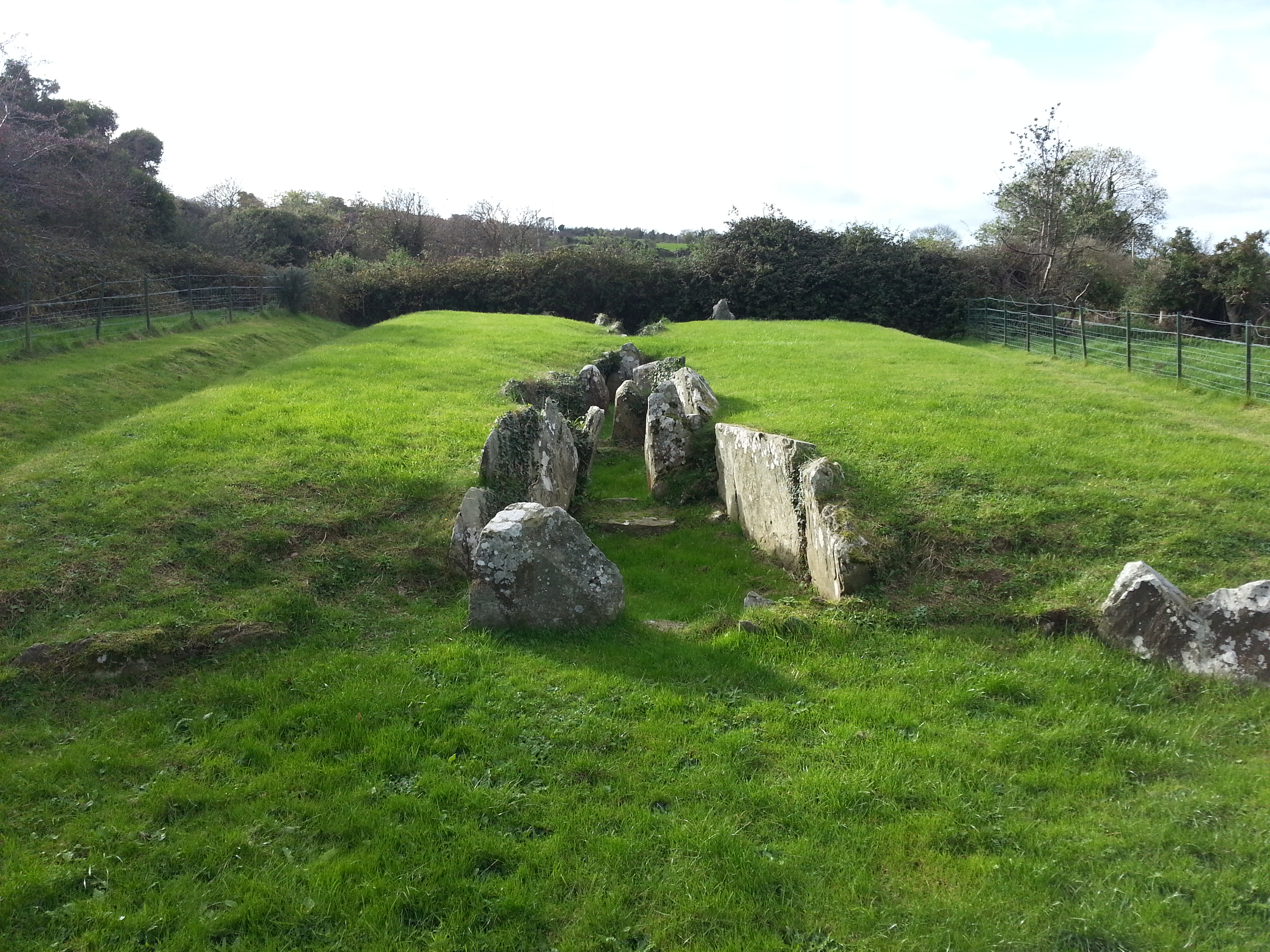
Audsleystown, County Down, Ireland

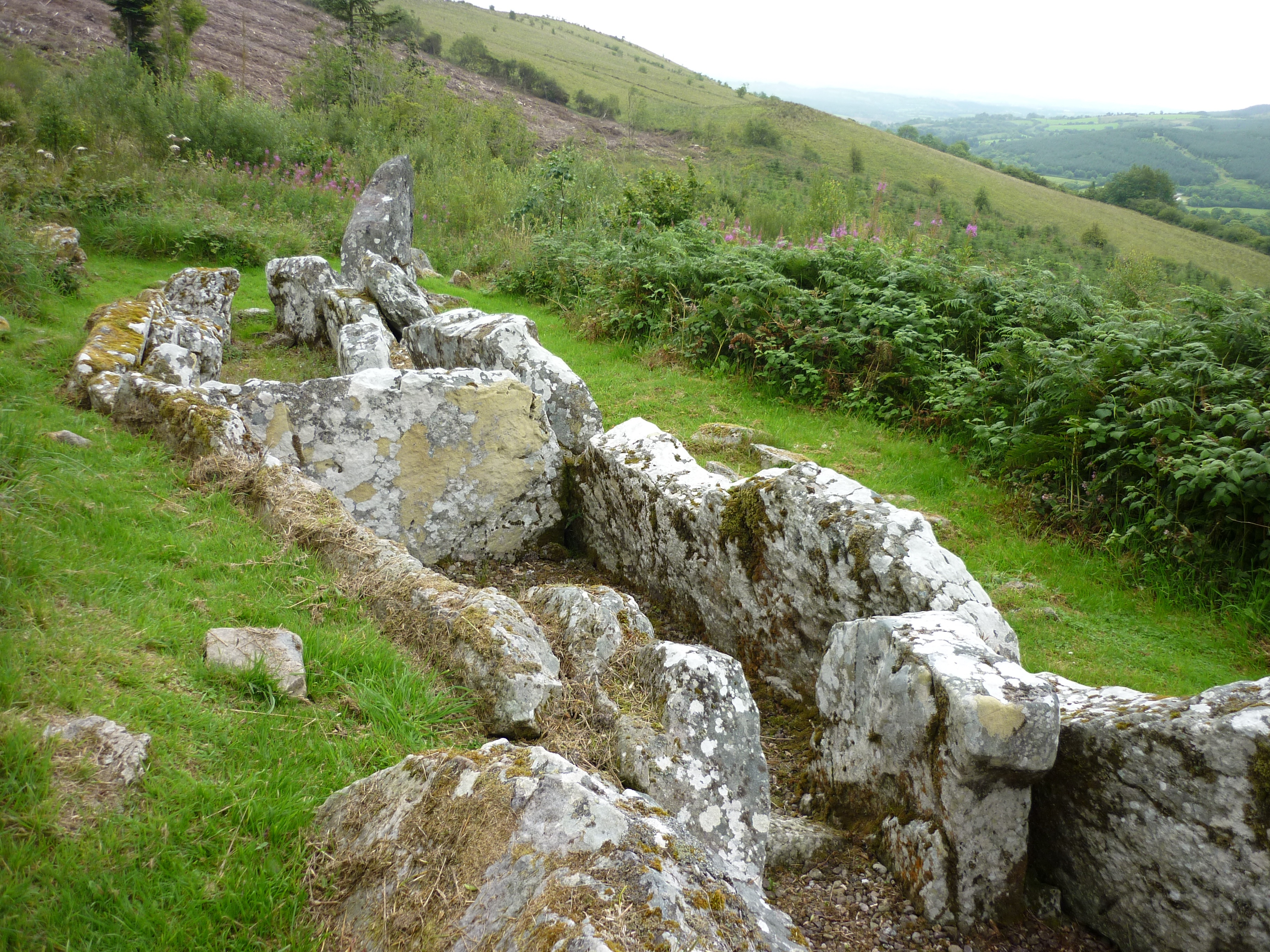
Dual court tomb, Aghanaglack, Northern Ireland.

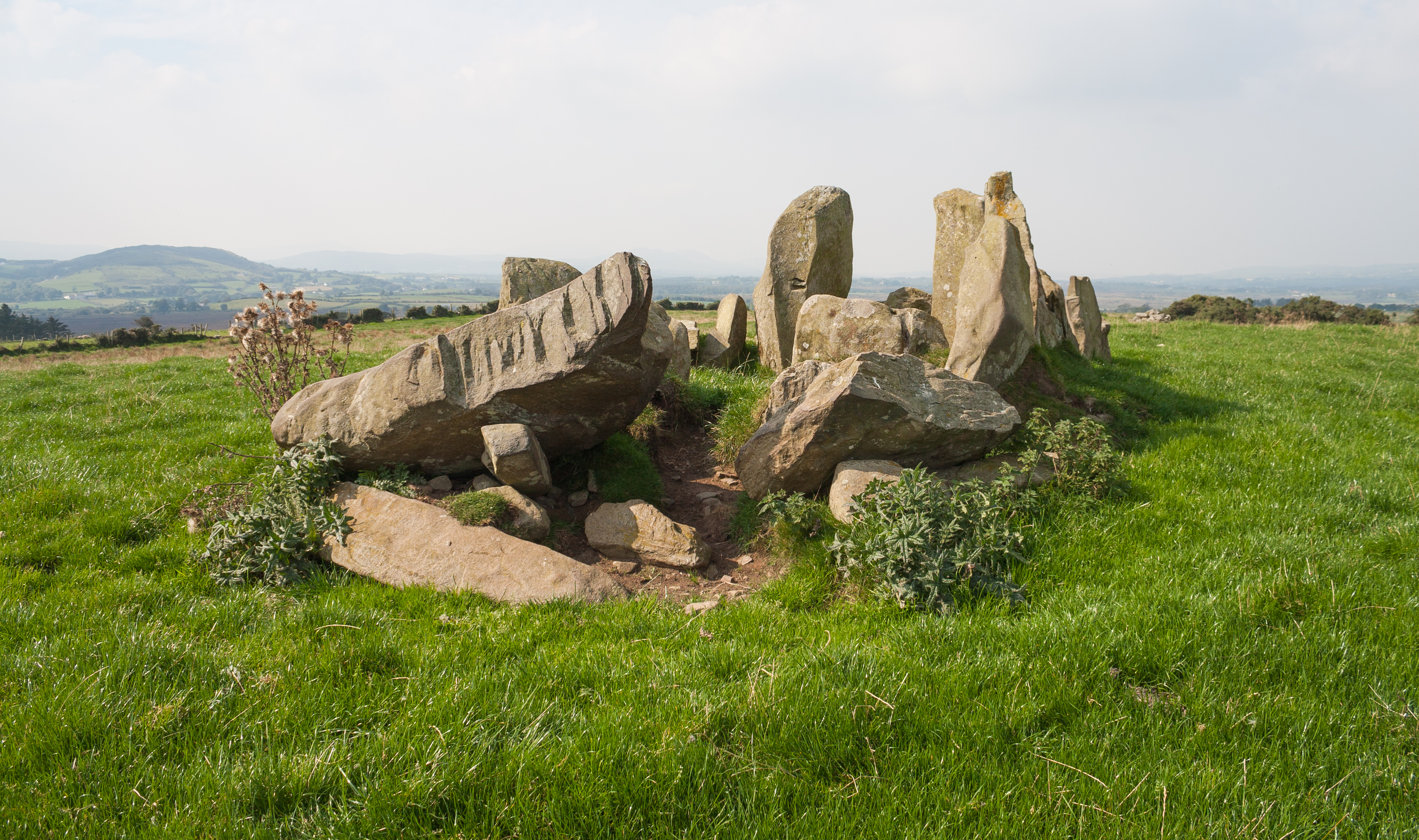
Laraghirril, Ireland

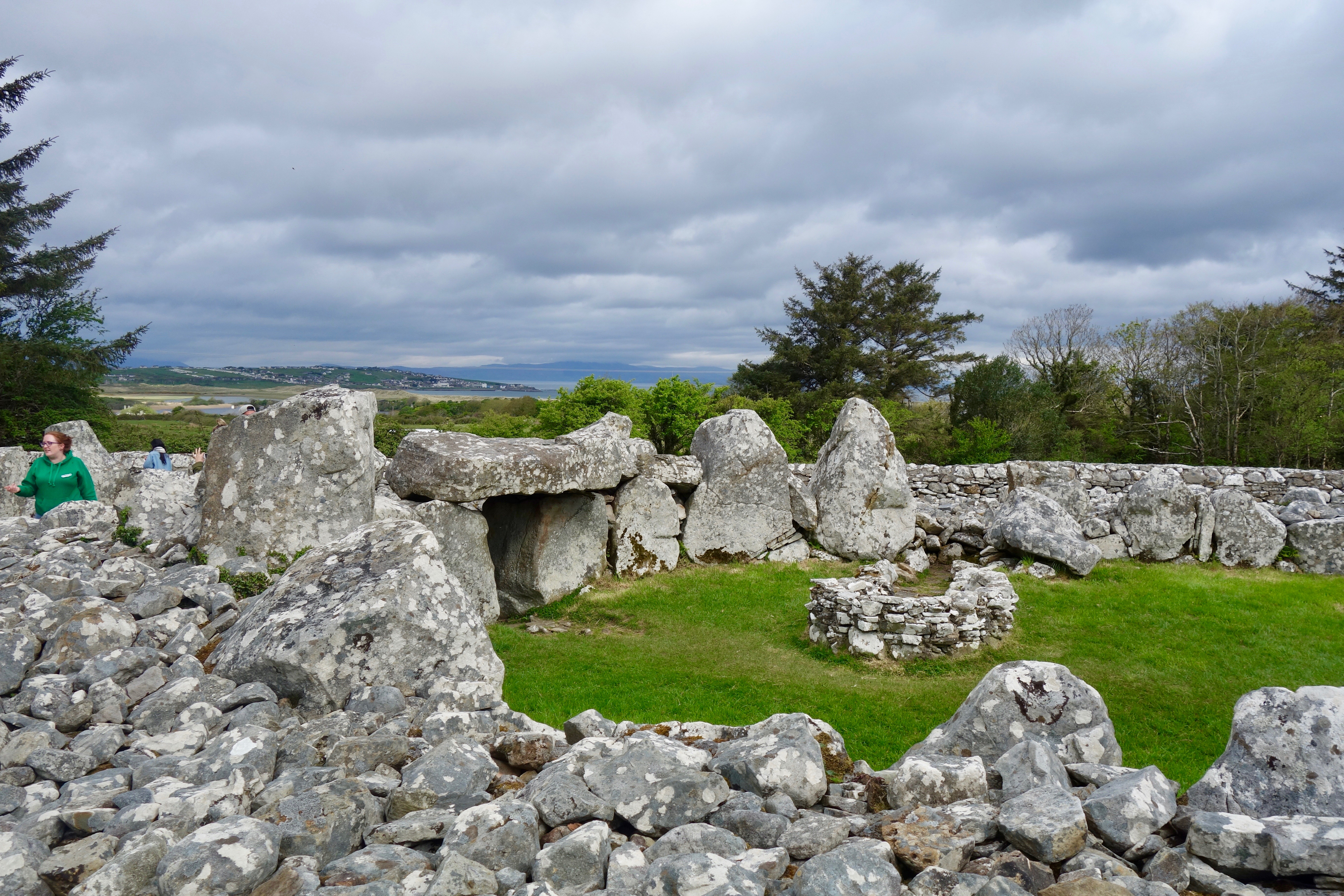
Creevykeel, County Sligo, Ireland

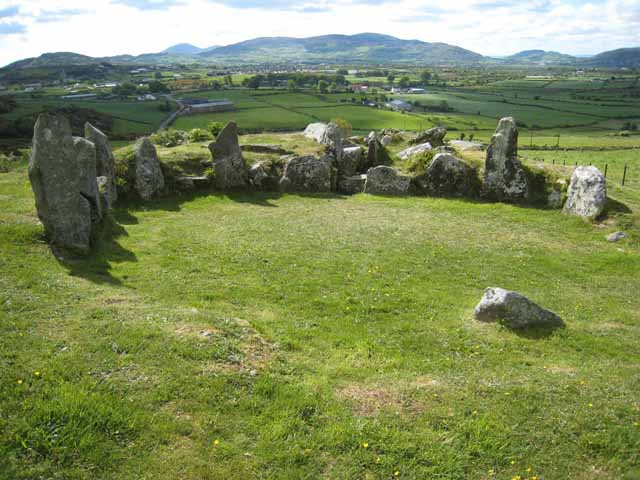
Ballymacdermot, Northern Ireland

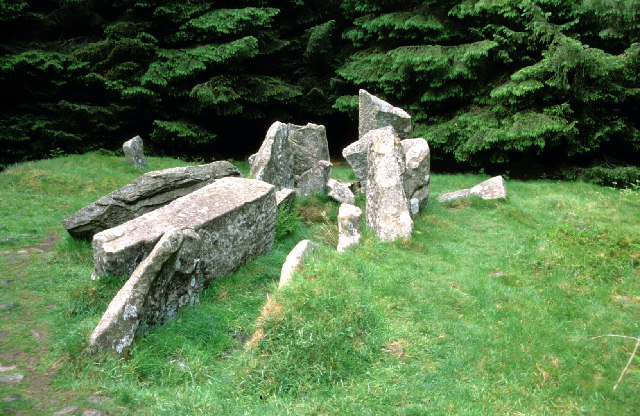
Giant's grave, Arran, Scotland

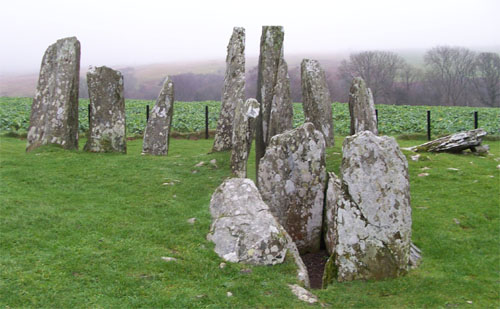
Cairnholy, Dumfries and Galloway, Scotland

== See also ==
- List of megalithic monuments in Ireland
- Prehistoric Ireland
- Prehistoric Scotland
- Passage tombs in Ireland

== Sources ==
- Cummings, Vicki (2016). "Chapter 3: 'Very Real Shared Traditions?' Thinking about Similarity and Difference in the Construction and Use of Clyde Cairns in the Western Scottish Neolithic". In Brophy, Kenneth; MacGregor, Gavin; Ralston, Ian B. (eds.). The Neolithic of Mainland Scotland. Edinburgh University Press. ISBN 978-0748685721.
- Cunliffe, Barry (2001). Facing the Ocean: The Atlantic and its Peoples. Oxford University Press. ISBN 978-0199240197.
- Noble, Gordon (2006). Neolithic Scotland: Timber, Stone, Earth and Fire. Edinburgh University Press. ISBN 978-0748623372.
- O'Kelly, Michael (1989). Early Ireland: An Introduction to Irish Prehistory. Cambridge University Press. ISBN 978-0521334891.
- Shee, Elizabeth (1990). Irish Megalithic Tombs (Shire Archaeology). Shire Publications. ISBN 978-0747800941.
