= Gallery grave =

Form of megalithic tomb

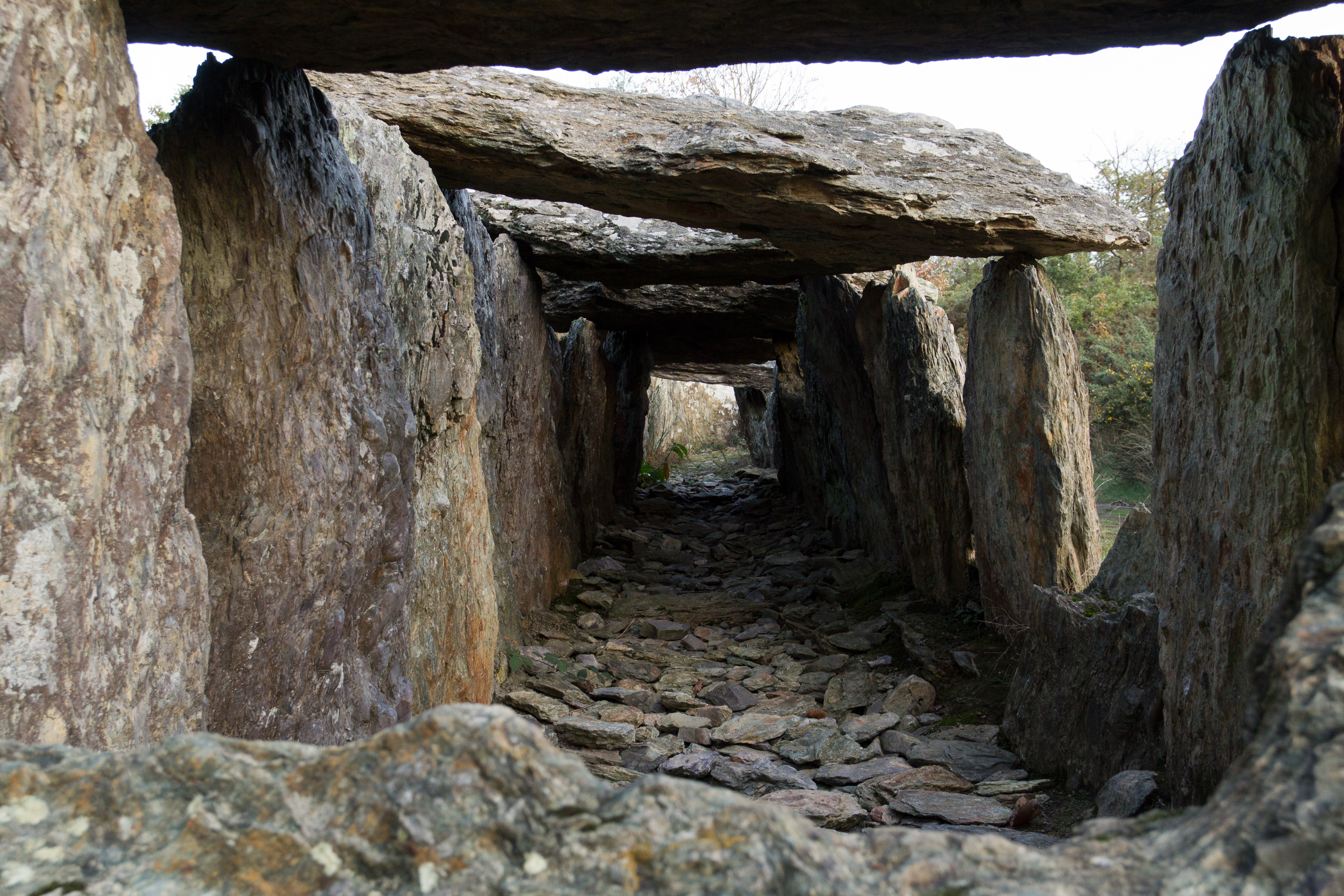
Gallery grave in Tréal, Brittany

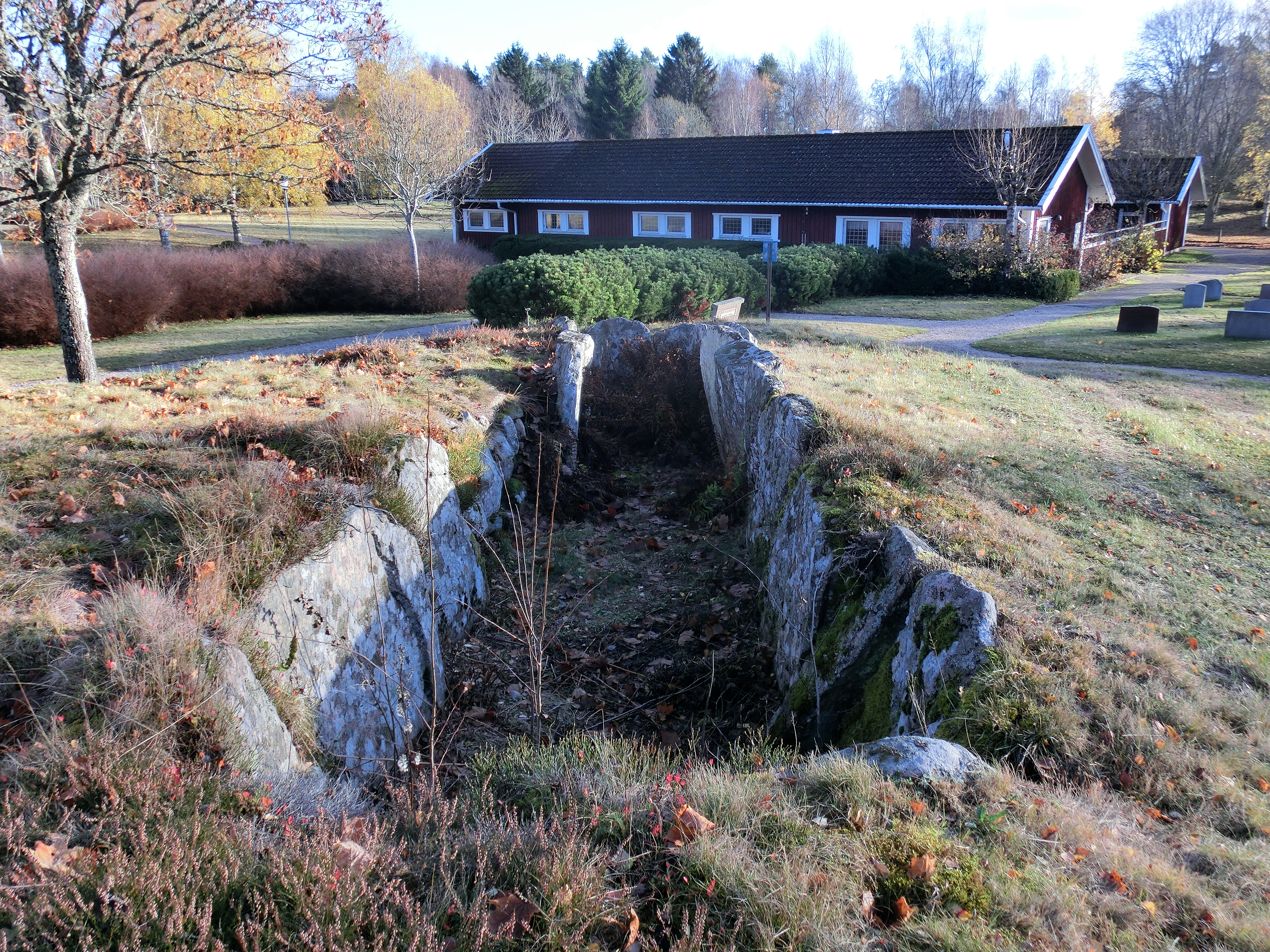
Gallery grave, missing a portion of its tumulus and all its stone caps, in Herrljunga, Sweden.

A gallery grave (French: Allée couverte) is a form of megalithic tomb built primarily during the Neolithic Age in Europe in which the main gallery of the tomb is entered without first passing through an antechamber or hallway. There are at least four major types of gallery grave (complex, transepted, segmented, and wedge-shaped), and they may be covered with an earthen mound (or "tumulus") or rock mound (or "cairn").

== Description ==
La Roche-aux-Fées, a gallery grave in France

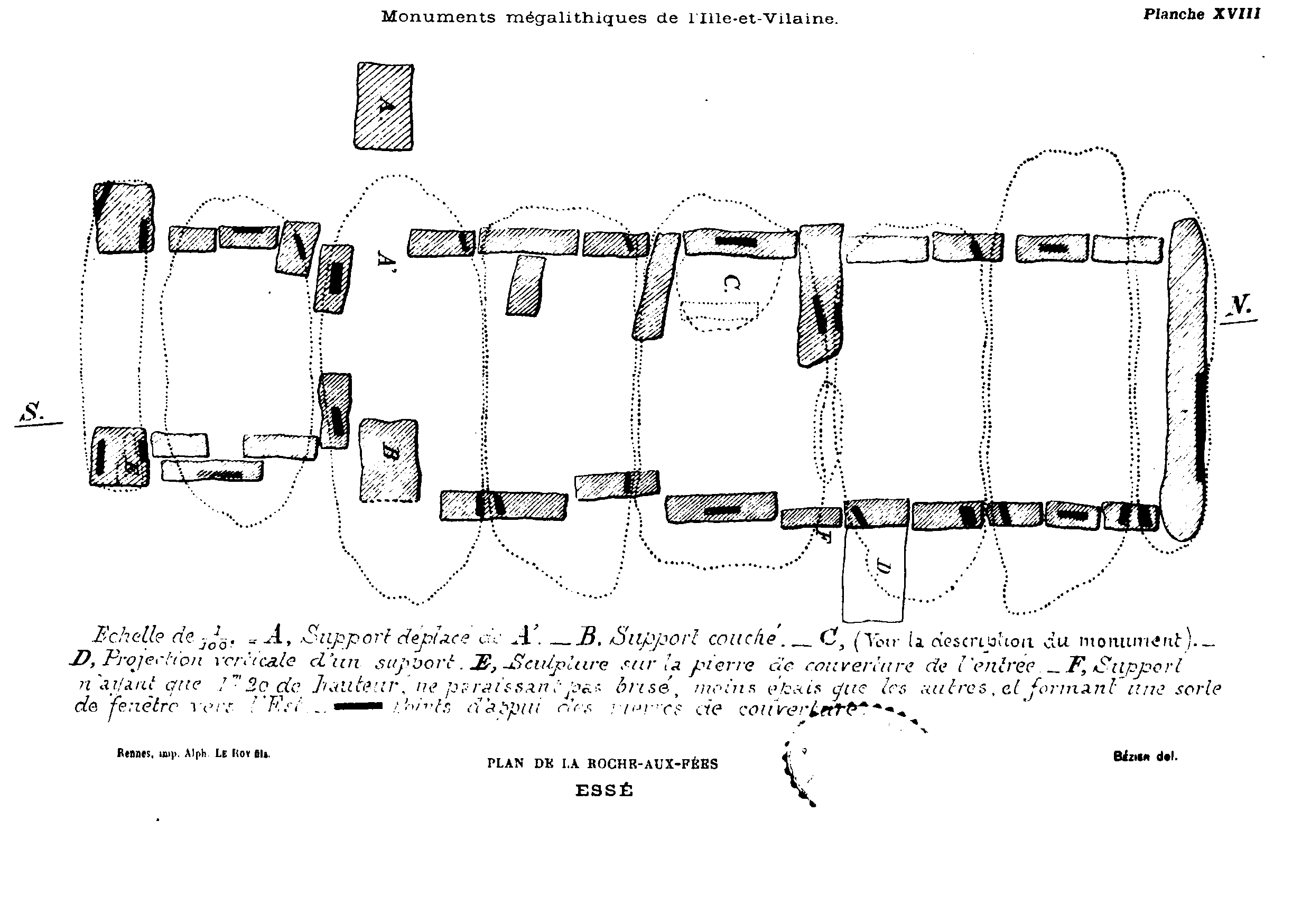
Drawing of the plan of the segmented gallery grave at La Roche-aux-Fées in France. Capstones (forming the ceiling) are represented by dotted lines.

Archeologist T. Douglas Price argues that the gallery grave was a form of community burial site. Those placed in a gallery grave were most likely members of the same family or hamlet, and probably were intended to reinforce the sense of community.

Gallery graves may be straight, or they may form an ell. In some cases, a burial chamber exists at the end of the gallery. The walls of gallery graves were built of orthostats, slab-like stones set upright in the earth. They were roofed with multiple flat stones, although the burial chamber (if one existed) was usually roofed with a single large stone. Multiple burials could occur all at one time, the grave could be reopened several times to accept new burials, or the grave could remain open over an extended period of time to accept multiple burials. Burials in gallery graves were made in the gallery itself, or in small burial chambers opening off the gallery. This is known as a "complex gallery grave". When the adjacent burial chambers are paired, the structure is known as a "transepted gallery grave". Gallery graves may also have their galleries subdivided by interior stone slabs. These are known as "segmented gallery graves". When two parallel galleries lead to a single terminal burial chamber, this is known as a "parallel gallery grave".

Some gallery graves were not rectangular in shape, but rather narrowed toward the rear. These are known as wedge-shaped gallery graves. The ceilings of wedge-shaped gallery graves often sloped toward the rear, and a sill of stone set some distance inside the away from the entrance or one or two slabs set upright in the earth defined a sort of antechamber. The wedge-shaped gallery grave was usually topped by a cairn (covering of stones) rather than an earthen mound (or "tumulus"), although an earthen mound was sometimes used. The cross-sectional shape of the cairn could be round, oval, or D-shaped, and often a kerb (ring of stone) was used to help revet the cairn and keep it in place. Some wedge-shaped gallery graves had curved rear walls, while others were linear. A few had the terminal burial chamber at the rear of the gallery, although this was usually blocked off. Wedge-shaped gallery graves sometimes had a set of outer walls. These could be parallel to the inner walls, or they could be set at an even stronger angle (emphasizing the wedge-like nature of the tomb). Wedge-shaped gallery graves usually faced west, and often had a pair of upright stone slabs linking the inner and outer walls at the entrance.

The tumulus (or "barrow") covering a gallery grave may be ovate or long. The sides of the tumulus may be parallel or not. The tumulus was designed so that the end of the gallery (or the terminal burial chamber, if one existed) was at the center of the tumulus. A tumulus may contain several gallery graves radiating outward from the center. Since the earth atop the gallery grave was only loosely piled up, it often washed away due to erosion. Many gallery graves today lie exposed to the air, when originally they would have lain deep within a tumulus.

=== Gallery vs. passage grave ===
The difference between a complex gallery grave and a passage grave (which also has smaller burial chambers opening off the main passage) is two-fold. First, the gallery grave gallery will be as high and wide as the side burial chambers, while in a passage grave the passage is not as high or wide as the burial chambers. Second, gallery graves are usually topped by a V-shaped tumulus, while passage graves are almost always covered by a round tumulus.

== Types ==
=== Transepted ===
Transepted gallery graves have burial monuments with side rooms extending laterally from a central chamber. They are found at sites in the Loire valley of France, south west Great Britain and in Ireland and it is thought the builders had cultural links with one another.

=== Wedge-shaped ===
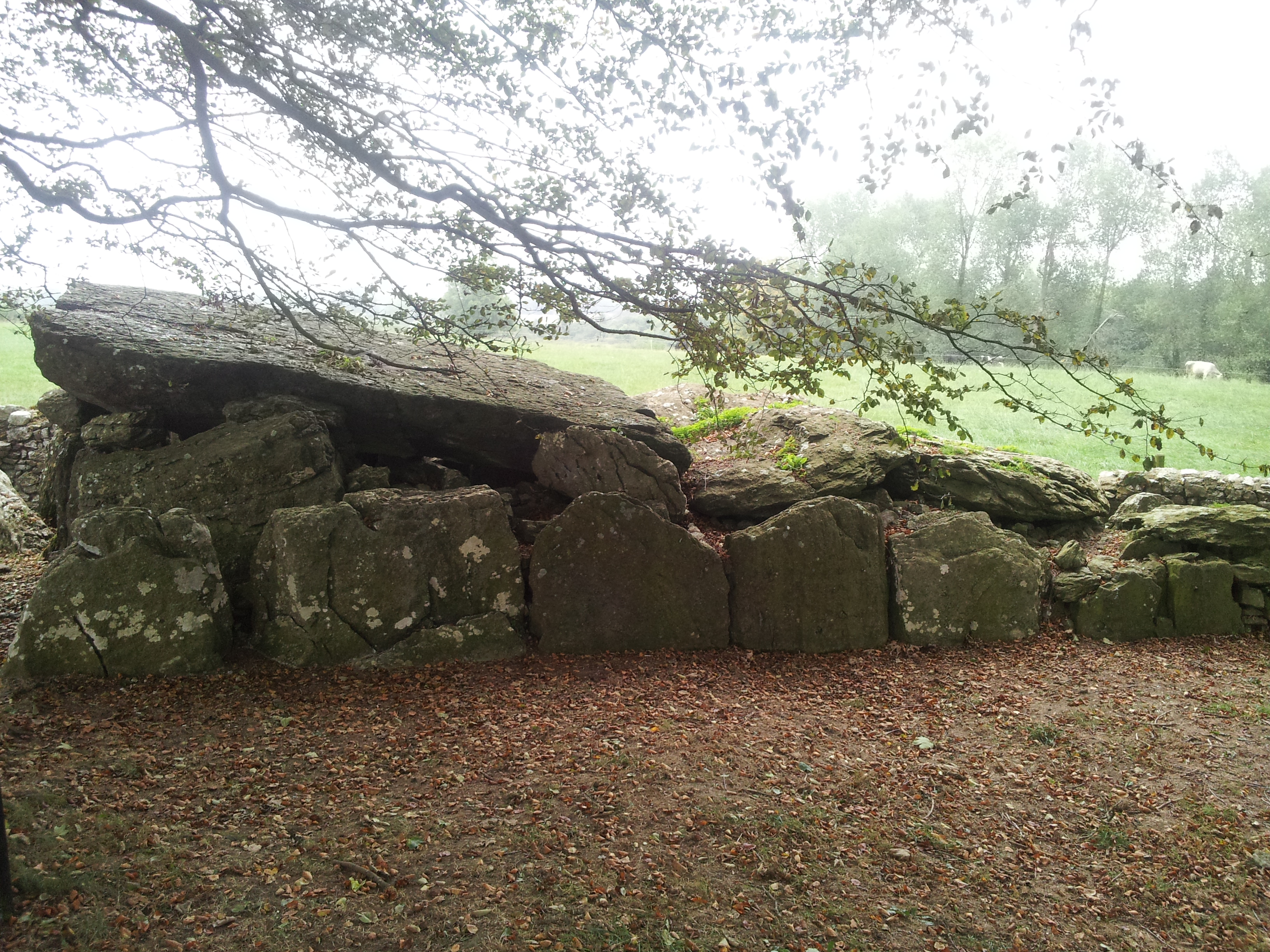
Labbacallee wedge tomb in Ireland

A wedge-shaped gallery grave or wedge tomb is a type of Irish chamber tomb. They are so named because the burial chamber narrows at one end (usually decreasing both in height and width from west to east), producing a wedge shape in elevation. An antechamber is separated from the burial area by a simple jamb or sill, and the doorway generally faces west.

A distinguishing characteristic of wedge tombs is the double-walling of the gallery. They were often covered by cairns, which could be round, oval or D-shaped, often with a kerb to revet it. More are low sized, usually about 1.5 metres high, and are generally found on mountainsides, about three-quarters the way up.

Wedge tombs were built between the Irish late Neolithic and middle Bronze Ages (about 2500 to 2000BC). Today, between 500 and 550 known wedge tombs survive in Ireland, and are found predominantly in the west and north west of the island.

== Dating ==
Along with the dolmen and passage grave, the gallery grave is the most common megalithic tomb in western Europe.

Gallery graves were usually constructed during the Neolithic Age, which began about 10,200 BC and ended in Europe about 3,200 BC. Some, however, were constructed in the Middle and Late Bronze Age, about 2,300 BC to 600 BC. Dating of some gallery graves is difficult, as the tombs may have been constructed in the Late Neolithic or Early Bronze Age, but reopened and used for burials until the Late Bronze Age.

== Examples ==
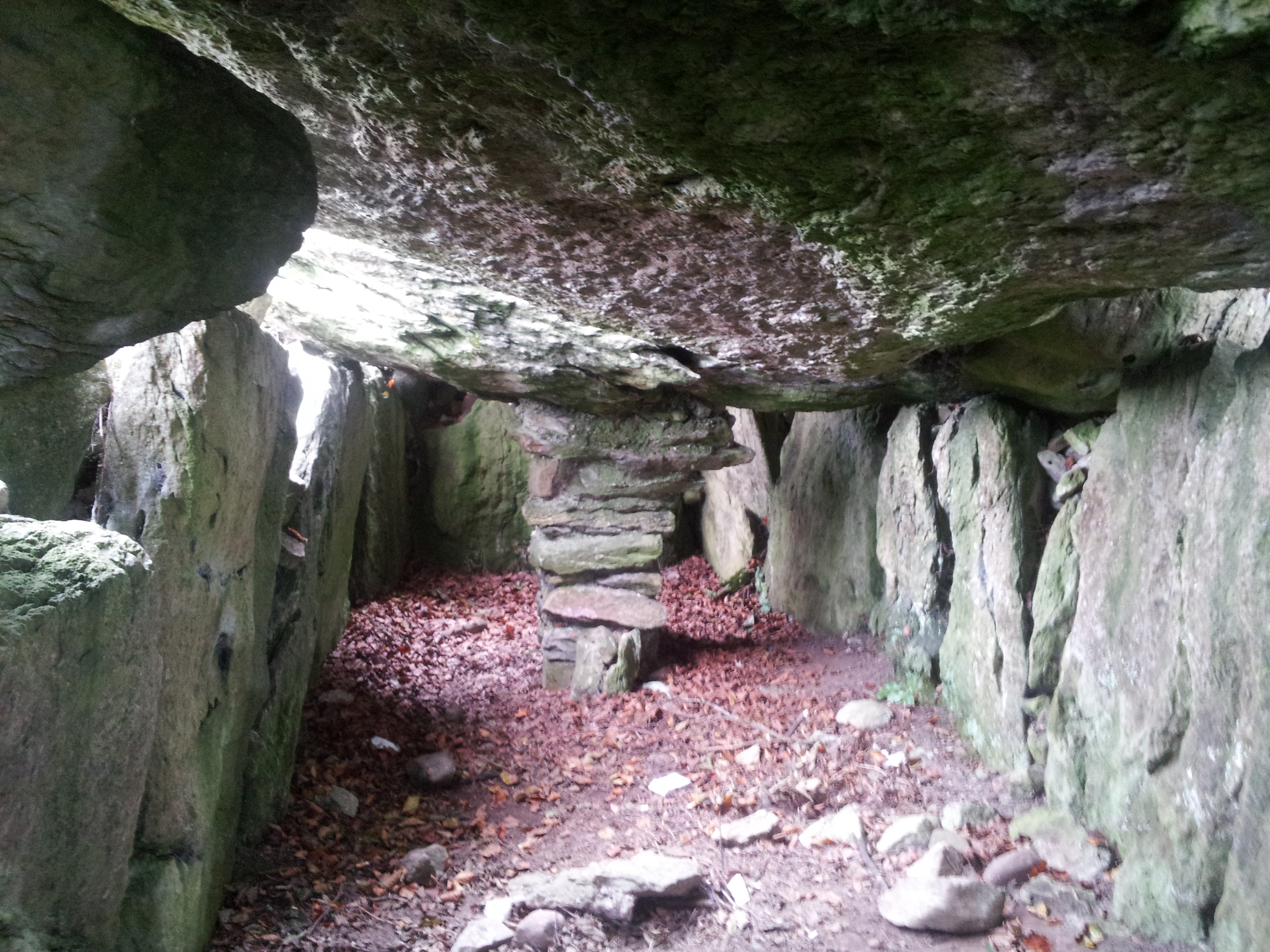
Interior of Labbacallee, a wedge-shaped gallery grave in Ireland.

Ty-Lia gallery grave in Brittany

Run-Aour gallery grave in Brittany

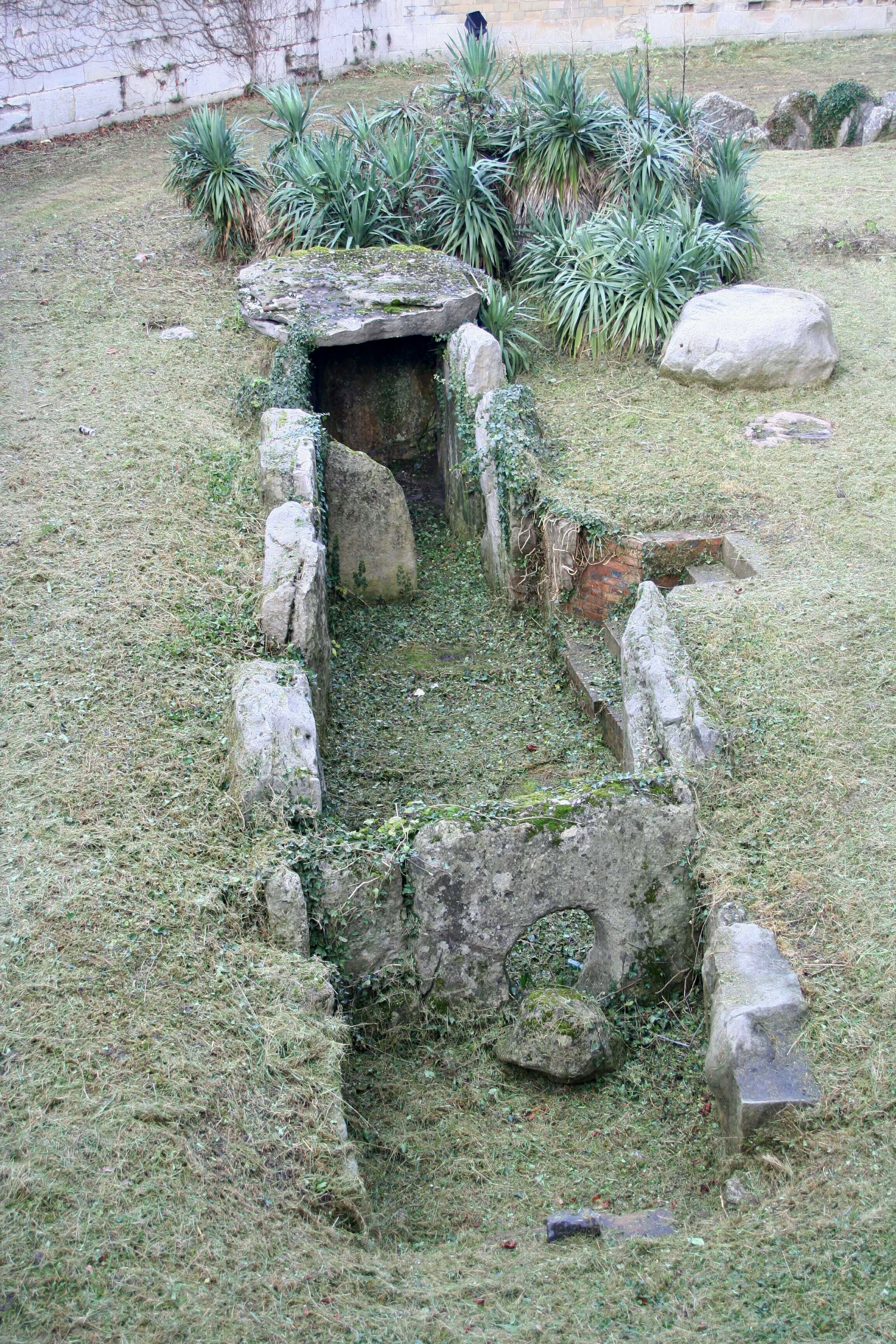
Saint-Germain-en-Laye gallery grave in France

Archeologists Ian Shaw and Robert Jameson argued in 1999 that the best-researched gallery graves are the Severn-Cotswold tombs in Wales and South West England in the United Kingdom. Other important gallery graves include:

- Court cairn, found in western and northern Ireland (Moytirra East Court Tomb) and southwest Scotland
- Giants' grave in Sardinia
- Glantane East wedge-shaped tomb in Ireland
- Naveta grave in Menorca
- Seine-Oise-Marne culture allées couverte in northern France and southern Belgium
- Severn-Cotswold tombs in Wales and South West England in the United Kingdom
- Wartberg culture stone cist group tombs in northern Hesse, southern Lower Saxony, and western Thuringia in Germany

== See also ==
- List of archaeological sites in County Cork
