= List of recumbent stone circles =

Type of stone circle found in Aberdeenshire, Scotland

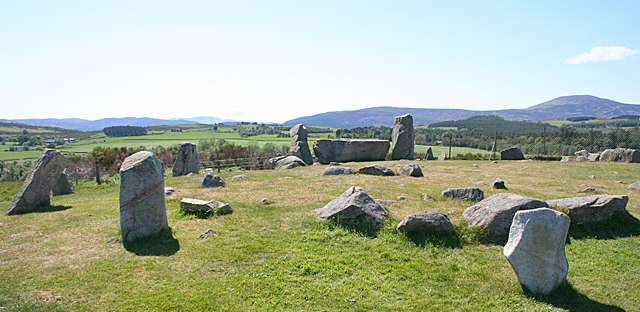
Tomnaverie recumbent stone circle

Recumbent stone circles are found mostly in Aberdeenshire in northeast Scotland. Their most striking characteristic is that in the general direction of south-southwest there is a large stone lying on its side with its length lining up with the perimeter of the circle. Thought to have been from the Bronze Age, their unusual design, and the possibility of being associated with astronomical observations, has attracted several surveys starting at the beginning of the 20th century.

In 2011 the Royal Commission on the Ancient and Historical Monuments of Scotland published an authoritative book on this type of monument and produced an online gazetteer. Since publication, two other recumbent stone circles have been identified by archaeologists.

== Surveys including recumbent stone circles ==
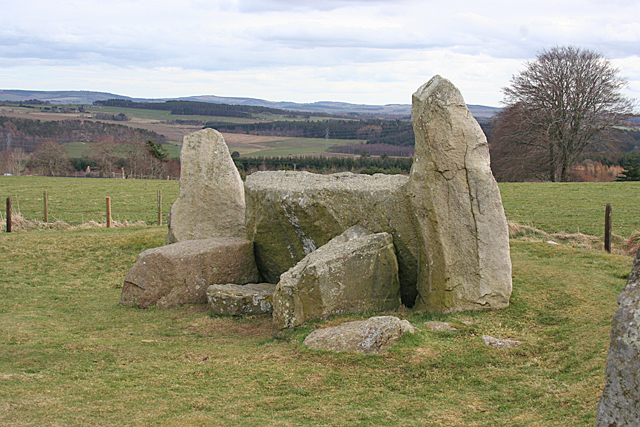
Easter Aquorthies stone circle showing the recumbent stone and two flankers

The particular characteristic of recumbent stone circles is that, as well as being a ring of upright stones (orthostats), they have a large stone lying on its side along the perimeter of the circle towards south to southwest. On both sides are particularly tall orthostats. The recumbent stone and flankers, as they are called, together form the recumbent setting. Around the ring the orthostats get progressively lower in height and more closely spaced until they reach the opposite side from the setting. These stone circles contain a low central ring cairn surrounded by comparatively small kerb stones.

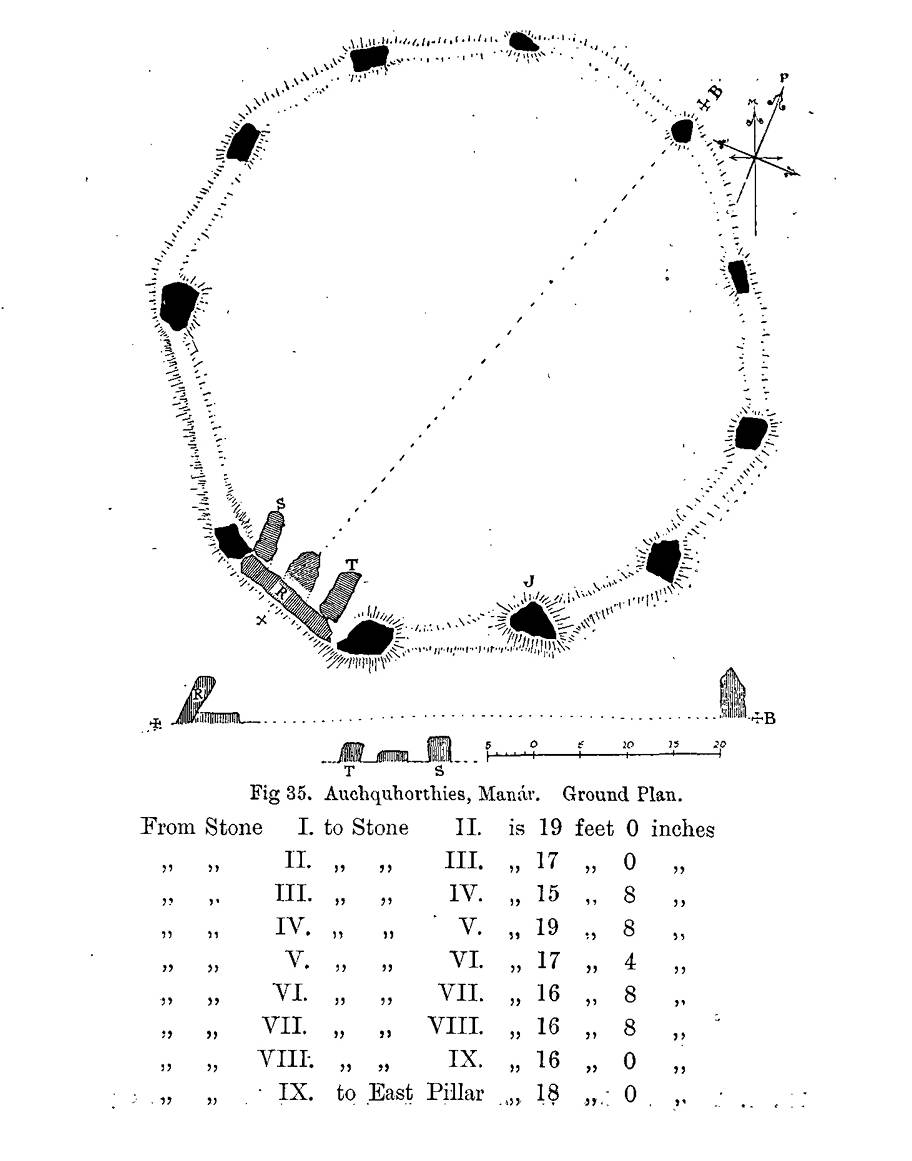
Coles' plan of Easter Aquhorthies stone circle, 1900

Thought to have been built in the Bronze Age, over the millennia many of these circles have become ruinous, being particularly vulnerable in the 18th and 19th centuries due to agricultural improvement, so many stones have fallen or been taken away and, indeed, only about half of the circles show any signs of a cairn without archaeological excavation.

As early as 1527 Hector Boece was writing about the stone circles in Scottorum Historia. Until the mid 19th century these circles, when they were noticed at all, were spoken of as being "Druidical Temples" or similar epithets and it was Frederick Coles who was the first person to carry out a systematic survey which he published in an annual series of papers from 1900 to 1907 in the Proceedings of the Society of Antiquaries of Scotland. (Note: Coles' papers involving recumbent stone circles are listed below. See Frederick Coles for his whole series of PSAS papers including his 1910 summary table.) Although Coles was careful and cautious in his identifications, he sometimes made misidentifications of circles in a ruinous condition. Somewhat similar stone circles were later found in the far southwest of Ireland where they were originally called recumbent stone circles until significant differences led to them becoming called "Cork–Kerry stone circles" and later axial stone circles.

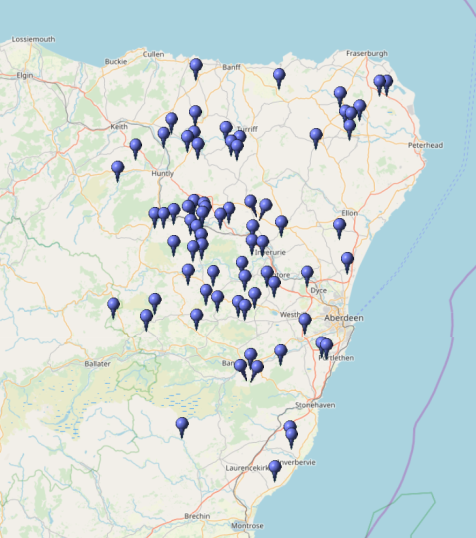
OpenStreetMap display of recumbent circles (all but two in Aberdeenshire)

As part of their wider interest in northern European stone circles, the northeast Scotland circles attracted Alexander Thom, Aubrey Burl and Clive Ruggles who catalogued them as part of their investigations into whether the recumbent setting could in some way be shown to have an astronomical significance. (Note: In particular Ruggles (1984), Ruggles & Burl (1985), Burl (1995) and Burl (2000).) Those identified as recumbent stone circles all were found in the traditional counties of Aberdeenshire (historic county) and Kincardineshire (with a very few just over the borders into Angus, and Banffshire). In current terms except for two they are all in the Aberdeenshire council area. In 2011 the Royal Commission on the Ancient and Historical Monuments of Scotland (RCAHMS) published an authoritative book, Welfare (2011), on recumbent stone circles specifically. The RCAHMS also issued an online gazetteer giving details of each monument that listed 71 as confirmed being recumbent and another 85 as not belonging in this category.

== List of circles categorised as recumbent by RCAHMS ==
List of circles categorised as recumbent
No. (Note: Numbers are those of Welfare (2011a).)	Name, parish (Note: From Welfare (2011a). All are in the current Aberdeenshire council area except the two otherwise noted.)	Condition Stones: S+F/T (Note: Condition: condition from Burl (2000, Gazetteer). Burl classifies the sites as follows 1 (good) = Good, worth visiting; 2 (OK) = Good but restored; 3 (ruin) = Ruined but recognisable; 4 (gone) = Destroyed or unrecognisable; 5 (unc.) = Uncertain. S+F/T: Number of stones Standing + number Fallen or mere stumps / Total number originally. Details from Welfare (2011a, Appendix 3) for standing and fallen and Welfare (2011a, Individual site entry in gazetteer) for original total.)	Code (Note: Code for status of recumbent setting. W/w refers to west flanker, R/r to recumbent and E/e to east flanker. Upper case means standing, lower case means fallen, — means missing. Details from Welfare (2011a, Gazetteer entry for each circle) unless otherwise noted.)	Diameter (metre) (Note: Diameters from Welfare (2011a) except where otherwise noted. Maximum and minimum given when oval.)	Axis (Note: Azimuth of the axis from centre of circle and over centre of recumbent stone from Ruggles (1984, Table 2). South is 180°, southwest is 225°.)	Burl refs. (Note: Reference numbers are those of Burl (1995) and later edition and Burl (2000). In both books the entries are divided by traditional county (Ab=Aberdeenshire, An=Angus, Ba=Banffshire, Ki=Kincardineshire).)	Canmore map/ ID (Note: Following the launch of the trove.scot website in February 2025, Historic Environment Scotland announced that the Canmore site would be retired in June 2025 with its records transferred to the new website. The Canmore ID is retained in the records as the National Record of the Historic Environment (NRHE) ID) Grid ref (Note: Canmore site reference and OS grid reference from Welfare (2011a), grid references truncated from 8 to 6 figures.)	Lat/ Long (Note: Converted from 8-figure OS grid reference.)
1	Aikey Brae, Old Deer	ruin 5+5/11	wRE	16.5x15	185.5°	Ab90; Ab1	NJ94NE 4; 20571 NJ958470	57.51398°N 2.07041°W
2	Aquhorthies, Banchory-Devenick	good 15+0/18	WR_	25x23.5	174°	Ki165; Ki2 (Note: Burl calls Aquhorthies "Auchquhorthies".)	NO99NW 1; 37186 NO901963	57.05801°N 2.16351°W
3	Ardlair, Kennethmont	ruin 5+3/9	WRE	11	159°	Ab91; Ab2	NJ52NE 4; 17641 NJ552279	57.33978°N 2.74472°W
4	Ardtannes Cottages, Inverurie	gone 0+0/?	___	-			NJ72SE 34; 18906 NJ757204	57.27369°N 2.40327°W
5	Auchlee, Banchory-Devenick	ruin 25+5/13	_R_	20		Ki1	NO89NE 4; 37069 NO890968	57.06284°N 2.18233°W
6	Auchmachar, Old Deer	gone 3+2/9	wrE	15		Ab4	NJ95SW 11; 20746 NJ948502	57.54226°N 2.08784°W
7	Auchmaliddie, New Deer	gone 0+2/?	wr_	-		Ab5	NJ84SE 1; 19879 NJ881448	57.49363°N 2.19932°W
8	Balnacraig, Lumphanan	gone 3+2/13or14	_R_	29	224°	Ab8	NJ60SW 5; 18024 NJ603035	57.12099°N 2.65676°W
9	Balquhain, Chapel of Garioch	ruin 6+4/14	WR_	21	190°	Ab94; Ab9	NJ72SW 2; 18989 NJ735240	57.30653°N 2.44147°W
10	Bankhead, Clatt	gone 0+1/10+	___	23		Ab27	NJ52NW 25; 17663 NJ529269	57.33092°N 2.78341°W
11	Bellman's Wood, Marnoch	gone 0+2/?	___	6.9		Ba1	NJ65SW 4; 18427 NJ604504	57.54208°N 2.66215°W
12	Berrybrae, Lonmay	ruin 5+0/10	WRE	13x10.7	231°	Ab95; Ab10	NK05NW 2; 21099 NK027571	57.60444°N 1.95563°W
13	Binghill, Peterculter	gone 3+5/10+	wRe	11.3	187°	Ab11	NJ80SE 16; 19377 NJ855023	57.11206°N 2.24069°W
14	Blue Cairn of Ladieswell, Logie Coldstone	ruin 3+5/10	_R_	23	207°	Ab12	NJ40NW 4; 17000 NJ411063	57.14407°N 2.97446°W
15	Braehead, Leslie	gone 1+0/?	_R_	-		Ab14	NJ52NE 6; 17643 NJ592255	57.31877°N 2.67805°W
16	Cairn Riv, (Note: Cairn Riv also called Carlin stone.) Inverkeithny	gone 2+0/?	_R_	30+?		Ab20	NJ64NE 4; 18323 NJ674465	57.50833°N 2.54504°W
17	Cairnton, Forgue	gone 2+0/?	WR_	-		Ab22	NJ54SE 1; 17855 NJ585446	57.49036°N 2.6924°W
18	Candle Hill, Insch	ruin 1+7/9or10	wre	15.5	163.5°	Ab23	NJ52NE 10; 17615 NJ599299	57.35844°N 2.66798°W
19	Castle Fraser, Cluny	good 7+3/10	WRE	20.5	203°	Ab97; Ab25	NJ71SW 3; 18719 NJ715125	57.20266°N 2.47333°W
20	The Cloch, Benholm	unc. 1+0/?	_R_	-		Ki6	NO76NE 1; 36304 NO781679	56.80247°N 2.35987°W
21	Clune Wood, Durris	ruin 7+2/9	WRE	17.5x16.7	183°	Ki18 (Note: Burl calls Clune Wood "Raes o’Clune".)	NO79SE 2; 36696 NO794949	57.04517°N 2.34013°W
22	Colmeallie, Edzell (Note: Colmeallie, Edzell is in the traditional county and council area of Angus)	gone 7+6/14	_rE	17	202.5°	An7	NO57NE 3; 35145 NO565781	56.8924°N 2.71479°W
23	Corrie Cairn, Tullynessle and Forbes	unc. 2+0/?	_R_	18.9?		Ab30	NJ52SE 13; 17683 NJ552205	57.27312°N 2.74421°W
24	Corrstone Wood, Auchindoir and Kearn	gone 1+6/17+	Wre	28		Ab31	NJ52NW 2; 17657 NJ510271	57.33188°N 2.81532°W
25	Corrydown, Auchterless	ruin 1+6/?	wR_	23	186°	Ab32	NJ74SW 11; 19197 NJ706444	57.48942°N 2.49071°W
26	Cothiemuir Wood, Keig	ruin 7+1/13-	WRE	20	200°	Ab98; Ab34	NJ61NW 1; 18055 NJ617198	57.26725°N 2.63648°W
27	Druidstone, Premnay	ruin 5+6/?	w_e	14.5	199°	Ab42	NJ62SW 4; 18213 NJ615221	57.2887°N 2.63984°W
28	Dunnideer, Insch	gone 3+0/?	WRE	-		Ab44	NJ62NW 4; 18161 NJ608284	57.34478°N 2.65194°W
29	Easter Aquhorthies, Inverurie (Note: Coles calls Easter Aquhorthies "Auchquhorthies, Manar.")	good 12+0/12	WRE	20x18.5	195.5°	Ab102; Ab46	NJ72SW 12; 18981 NJ732207	57.27696°N 2.44559°W
30	Eslie the Greater, Banchory-Ternan	ruin 9+0/12	WRE	24	176°	Ki169; Ki11	NO79SW 2; 36714 NO717915	57.01458°N 2.46748°W
31	Frendraught, Forgue	gone 1+7/?	_R_	22x20		Ab50	NJ64SW 6; 18370 NJ610428	57.47423°N 2.65041°W
32	Gaval, Old Deer	gone 1+0/?	___	-		Ab53	NJ95SE 3; 20734 NJ980515	57.5536°N 2.03422°W
33	The Gray Stone of Clochforbie, King Edward	gone 0+1/?	_r_	-		Ab28	NJ75NE 1; 19227 NJ796586	57.61719°N 2.34178°W
34	Hatton of Ardoyne, Oyne	good 5+4/13+	_RE	27x25	219.5°	Ab59	NJ62NE 7; 18125 NJ659267	57.3301°N 2.56665°W
35	Hill of Fiddes, Foveran	gone 2+0/10	WR_	14		Ab61	NJ92SW 1; 20401 NJ935243	57.30941°N 2.10952°W
36	Hill of Milleath, Cairnie	gone 0+0/? (Note: In 1905 Coles found the circle had been completely destroyed in about 1875.)	___	23.7		Ab54 (Note: Burl calls Milleath "Gingomyres")	NJ44SE 9; 17326 NJ467429	57.47359°N 2.88884°W
37	Inschfield, Insch	gone 1+2/?	_rE	23.5		Ab67	NJ62NW 6; 18167 NJ623293	57.35299°N 2.62766°W
38	Kirkton of Bourtie, Bourtie	ruin 5+0/10or11	_RE	22		Ab105; Ab68	NJ8ZSW 2; 19708 NJ800248	57.31405°N 2.33216°W
39	Loanend, Premnay	gone 2+0/?	_R_	25		Ab70	NJ62SW 1; 18190 NJ604242	57.30676°N 2.65741°W
40	Loanhead of Daviot, Daviot	good 11+0/11	WRE	21	200°	Ab106; Ab71	NJ72NW 1; 18789 NJ747288	57.34945°N 2.42088°W
41	Loudon Wood, Old Deer	ruin 4+3/10or11	WRe	19.6x17.5	194°	Ab108; Ab74	NJ94NE 1; 20538 NJ960497	57.53769°N 2.06695°W
42	Mains of Hatton, Auchterless	ruin 2+7/12+	_R_	23x21	165°	Ab75	NJ64SE 6; 18357 NJ699425	57.47212°N 2.50299°W
43	Midmar Kirk, Midmar	OK 8+0/11	WRE	17	231°	Ab109; Ab78	NJ60NE 3; 18001 NJ699064	57.14831°N 2.49842°W
44	Millplough, Arbuthnott	gone 1+0/?	_R_	20-		Ki15	NO87NW 6; 36819 NO819754	56.87001°N 2.29835°W
45	Montgoldrum, The Camp, Arbuthnott	gone 3+2/?	_r_	23	179°	Ki5 (Note: Burl calls Montgoldrum "The Camp".)	NO87NW 5; 36818 NO816772	56.88581°N 2.30258°W
46	Nether Dumeath, Glass	gone 2+4/12	___	11		Ab85	NJ43NW 7; 17280 NJ425378	57.42744°N 2.95866°W
47	Netherton of Logie, Crimond	ruin 11+17/15?	WRE	17	185°	Ab86	NK05NW 3; 21100 NK043572	57.60497°N 1.92902°W
48	New Craig, Daviot	gone 4+1/?	WRE	22+		Ab87	NJ72NW 3; 18811 NJ745296	57.35671°N 2.42462°W
49	The Nine Stanes, Garrol, Banchory-Ternan	ruin 9+1/11	Wre	18.5x15.5	157.5°	Ki171; Ki13 (Note: Burl calls Nine Stanes "Garrol Wood".)	NO79SW 8; 36748 NO723912	57.01129°N 2.45723°W
50	North Strone, Alford	good 5+13/18	wrE	18.5	180°	Ab110; Ab88	NJ51SE 2; 17588 NJ584138	57.21388°N 2.6897°W
51	Old Keig, Keig	ruin 4+4/?	WRE	27	212.5°	Ab111; Ab89	NJ51NE 2; 17530 NJ596193	57.26339°N 2.67057°W
52	Old Kirk of Tough, Cluny	ruin 2+0/11?	___	25?		Ab6	NJ60NW 1; 18006 NJ625092	57.17282°N 2.62179°W
53	Old Rayne, Rayne	ruin 1+7/10+	___	26.5?	195°	Ab112; Ab90	NJ62NE 1; 18081 NJ679279	57.34121°N 2.53359°W
54	Pitglassie, Auchterless	ruin 1+1/12-	_R_	18		Ab91	NJ64SE 8; 18359 NJ686434	57.48048°N 2.52495°W
55	Potterton, Belhelvie	gone 1+2/?	wRe	-		Ab92	NJ91NE 7; 20294 NJ952163	57.23793°N 2.07965°W
56	The Ringing Stone, Cairnie	gone 1+5/?	_R_	18.3	188.5°	Ab92; Ab3 (Note: Burl calls Ringing Stone "Arnhill".)	NJ54NW 12; 17827 NJ531454	57.49683°N 2.78312°W
57	Rothiemay, Rothiemay (Note: Rothiemay is in the council area of Moray.)	ruin 5+0/12or14	_R_	28	216.5°	Ba134; Ba13	NJ54NE 6; 20294 NJ550487	57.5264°N 2.7517°W
58	St Brandan's Stanes, Boyndie	gone 2+3/?	W_E	-		Ba14	NJ66SW 1; 18495 NJ607610	57.63767°N 2.65903°W
59	South Fornet, Skene	ruin 2+6/?	W_E	26.8		Ab100	NJ71SE 1; 18687 NJ782109	57.18902°N 2.36081°W
60	South Ley Lodge, Kintore	gone 3+0/?	WRE	16.5? or 29.6?		Ab101	NJ71SE 3; 18705 NJ766132	57.20942°N 2.38783°W
61	Stonehead, Insch	ruin 3+0/?	WRE	19x16?		Ab103	NJ62NW 5; 18166 NJ601286	57.34696°N 2.66461°W
62	Strichen House, Strichen (Note: Strichen House has been wholly reconstructed.)	OK 9+1/10	WRE	15.4x12.8	161°	Ab116; Ab105	NJ95SW 2; 20754 NJ936544	57.58024°N 2.10749°W
63	Sunhoney, Midmar	good 11+1/12	WrE	25	231°	Ab117; Ab106	NJ70NW 55; 18543 NJ715057	57.14132°N 2.47106°W
64	Tillyfourie, Monymusk	ruin 4+9/13	WRe	20	203°	Ab120 (Note: Burl calls Tillyfourie "Whitehill".)	NJ61SW 3; 18074 NJ643135	57.21087°N 2.59247°W
65	Tilquhillie, Banchory-Ternan	gone 1+1/?	___	-		Ki19	NO79SW 10; 36704 NO725940	57.03627°N 2.45473°W
66	Tomnagorn, Midmar	ruin 7+5/12	WRE	21	202.5°	Ab118; Ab108	NJ60NE 1; 17999 NJ651077	57.15928°N 2.57792°W
67	Tomnaverie, Coull	OK (Note: Status was "ruin" and stones 5+5/13 before 1999 reconstruction of Bradley (2005).) 11+0/13	wre (Note: According to Ruggles (1984, Table 1). WRE after 1999 reconstruction.)	17	235.5°	Ab119; Ab109	NJ40SE 1; 17006 NJ486034	57.11947°N 2.84962°W
68	Tyrebagger, Dyce	good 10+1/11	WRE	18.5	178.5°	Ab101; Ab45 (Note: Burl calls Tyrebagger "Dyce".)	NJ40SE 11; 19513 NJ859132	57.20944°N 2.23421°W
69	Wantonwells, Insch	gone 1+1/?	_Re	-		Ab115	NJ62NW 2; 18139 NJ618272	57.33454°N 2.63499°W
70	Wester Echt, Echt	ruin 3+0/?	W__	23		Ab118	NJ70NW 2; 18534 NJ738083	57.16516°N 2.43399°W
71	Yonder Bognie, Forgue	ruin 6+3/12-	WRe	22x18	182.5°	Ab122; Ab122	NJ64NW 15; 18335 NJ600457	57.50037°N 2.66807°W

== Recently classified recumbent stone circles ==
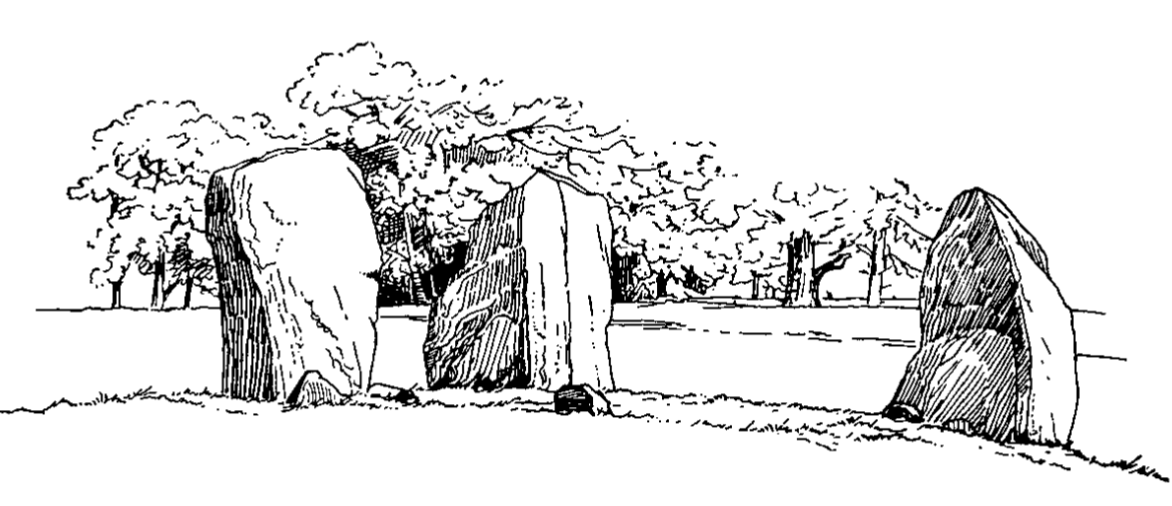
Coles' sketch of Nether Coullie, 1901

In 2013 a site at Hillhead was excavated and found to be a recumbent stone circle. The site had been noticed in 1998 but was thought to have been the location of the remains of a roundhouse. The excavation uncovered the sockets for two flankers and a depression in the ground where the recumbent probably lay. Nether Coullie stone circle was listed in the 2011 RCAHS gazetteer as not being a recumbent stone circle but following careful inspection of archive records and another site inspection it was reclassified in 2015. Other stone circles investigated recently, but which have found to be modern, include Mill of Birkenbower and Holmhead.

No.	Name, parish	Condition Stones: S+F/T	Code	Diameter (metre)	Axis	Burl refs.	Canmore map/ ID Grid ref	Lat/ Long
-	Hillhead, Tarland	gone 0+1/? (Note: Only one fallen orthostat exists.)	___	26	237°	-	NJ50NW 61; 138717 NJ507071	57.15248°N 2.81618°W
Ap1, 65 (Note: Included in Welfare (2011a) in Appendix 1, number 65, as not meeting the requirements of an RSC.)	Nether Coullie, Monymusk	gone 0+1/? (Note: Only one fallen orthostat exists.)	___	24		Ab84	NJ71NW 11; 18657 NJ709156	57.23056°N 2.482317°W

== See also ==
- List of axial multiple-stone circles
- List of axial five-stone circles
