= Aikey Brae stone circle =

Recumbent stone circle in Aberdeenshire, Scotland

Aikey Brae
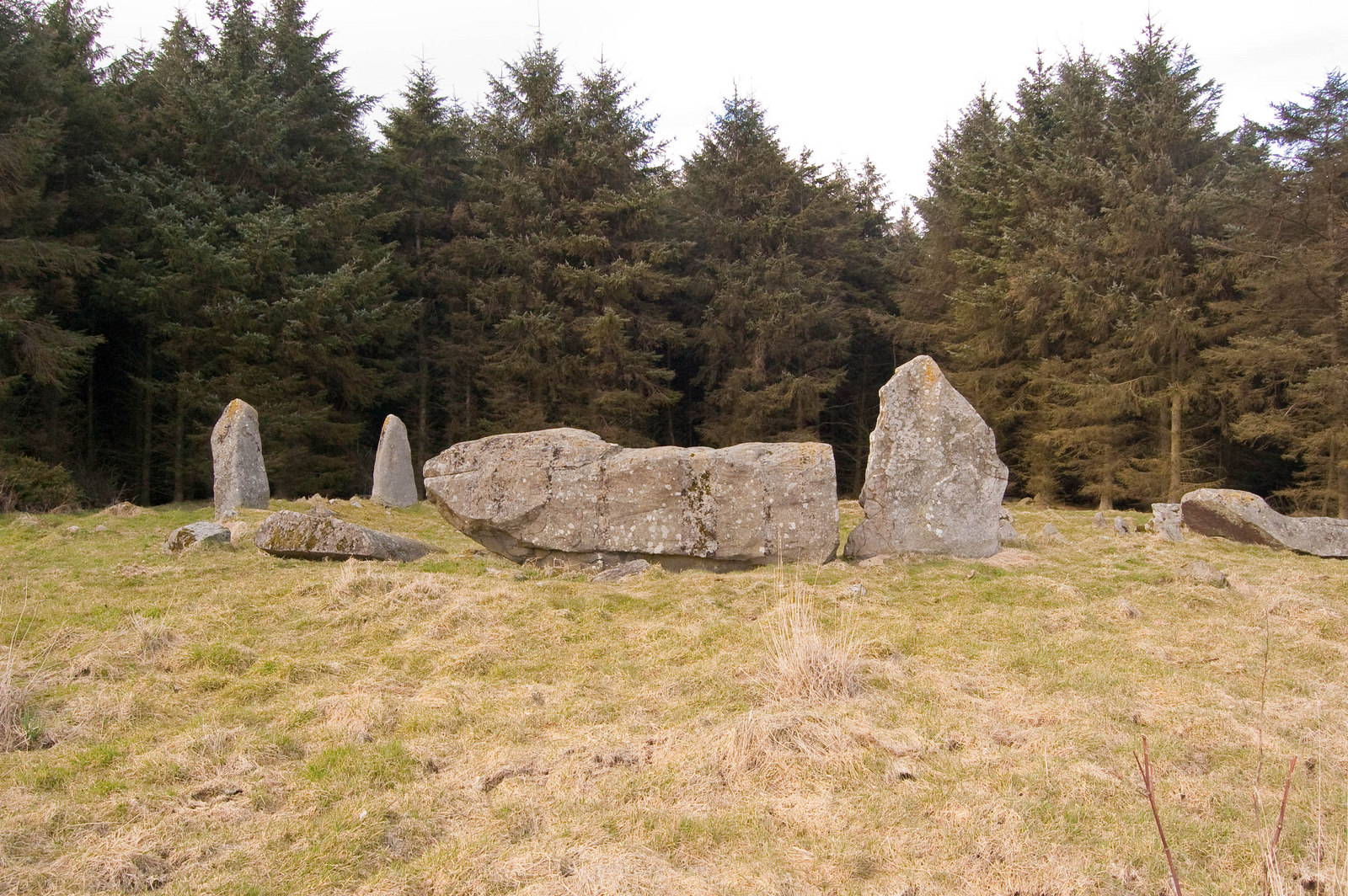
- View of circle with recumbent in centre
- Interactive map of Aikey Brae
- 57.5140°N 2.0704°W
- Type: Recumbent stone circle
- Location: near Old Deer
- Region: Aberdeenshire

Site notes
- Public access: Yes

Scheduled monument
- Official name: Parkhouse Hill stone circle (Aikey Brae)
- Type: Prehistoric ritual and funerary: stone circle or ring
- Designated: 17 August 1925
- Reference no.: SM2

Aikey Brae is a recumbent stone circle on Parkhouse Hill near Old Deer in Aberdeenshire, Scotland. The recumbent stone is about 21.5 tonnes and there are five stones still erected in total. The site has been excavated most recently by Chris Ball and Richard Bradley. It is a scheduled monument.

== Recumbent stone circles ==
A recumbent stone circle is a type of stone circle constructed in the early Bronze Age. The identifying feature is that the largest stone (the recumbent) is always laid horizontally, with its long axis generally aligned with the perimeter of the ring between the south and southwest. A flanker stone stands each side of the recumbent and these are typically the tallest stones in the circle, with the smallest being situated on the northeastern aspect. The rest of the circle is usually composed of between six and ten orthostats graded by size. The builders tended to select a site which was on a level spur of a hill with excellent views to other landmarks. Over seventy of these circles are found in lowland Aberdeenshire in northeast Scotland – the most similar monuments are the axial stone circles of southwest Ireland. Recumbent stone circles generally enclosed a low ring cairn, though over the millennia these have often disappeared. They may have been a development from the Clava cairns found in Inverness-shire and axial stone circles may have followed the design. Whilst cremated remains have been found at some sites, the precise function of these circles is not known.

== Description ==
The stone circle has five stones still standing (including the recumbent) and five that are fallen. It is located on the summit of Parkhouse Hill, near to Old Deer and is also known as Parkhouse Hill stone circle. The recumbent stone is one of the largest in Aberdeenshire, weighing about 21.5 tonnes. The circle is between 15 and 16.5 metres wide and surrounded by a ring bank. The trees adjacent to the site were felled in October and November 2019.

== History ==
Aikey Brae became a scheduled monument in 1925. In the 1980s, Clive Ruggles and Aubrey Burl both assessed the site in terms of archaeo-astronomy. Excavations were carried out by Chris Ball and Richard Bradley in 2001. They found the kerbstones in the ring bank were alternately red and white. Anomalous radiocarbon dating suggested the circle was from the Late Bronze Age. Artefacts found included 43 items of worked stone, quartz flakes and flint scrapers. Ball and Bradley found that Aikey Brae resembled other Buchan circles and was not slowly built over time like Tomnaverie stone circle.

== See also ==
- List of recumbent stone circles
