= Dunnideer stone circle =

Stone circle in Aberdeenshire, Scotland

Dunnideer
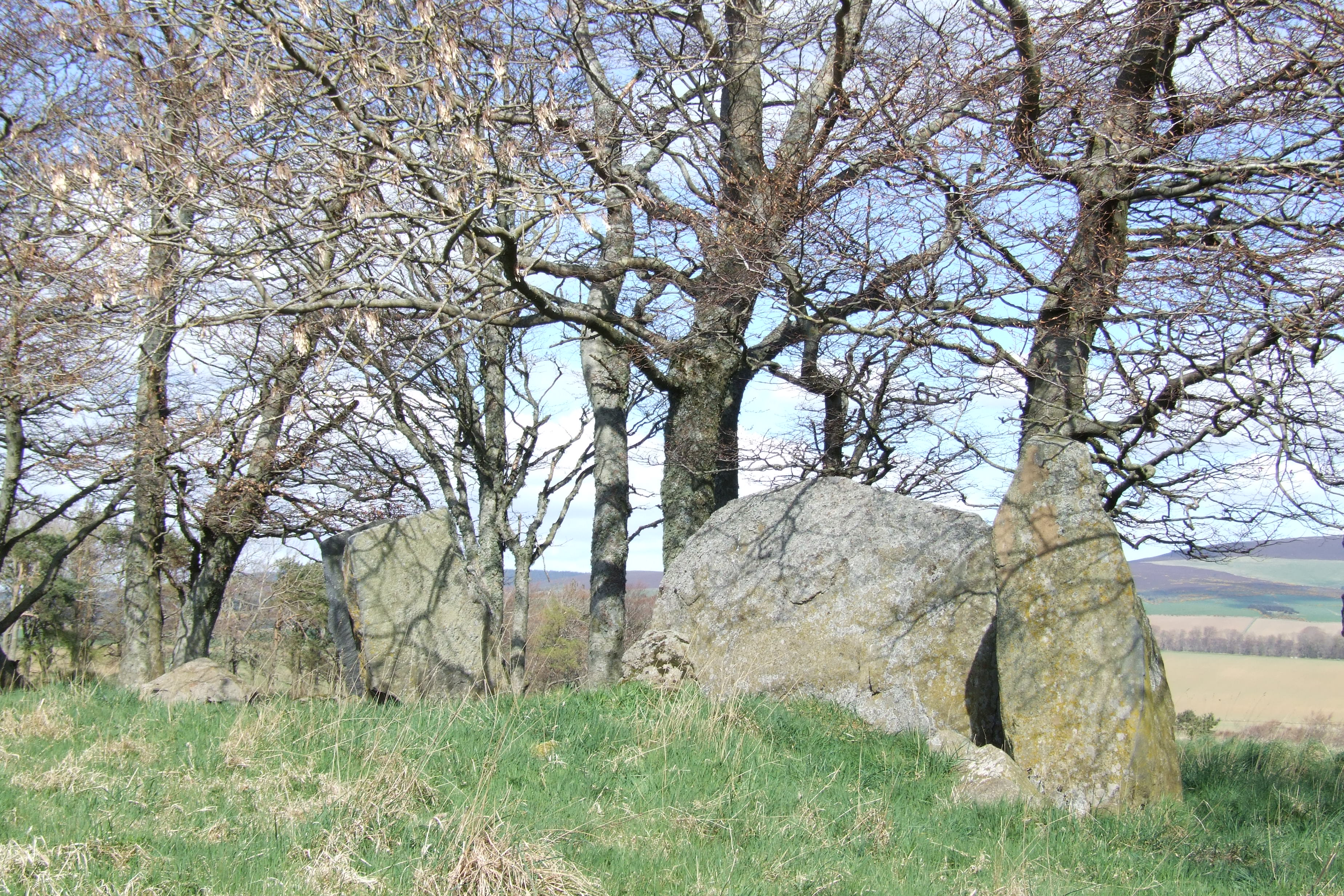
- Dunnideer in 2007

- Location within Aberdeenshire
- Interactive map of Dunnideer
- 57.344921°N 2.651913°W
- Type: Recumbent stone circle
- Periods: Neolithic
- Location: Scotland
- Region: Aberdeenshire
- OS grid reference: NJ609285

Site notes
- Public access: Yes

Scheduled monument
- Official name: Dunnideer stone circle
- Type: Prehistoric ritual and funerary: stone circle or ring
- Designated: 9 October 1925
- Reference no.: SM21

Dunnideer stone circle is a mostly destroyed recumbent stone circle located near Insch in Aberdeenshire, Scotland. The three remaining stones lie close to the ruins of Dunnideer Castle. It is a scheduled monument.

== Recumbent stone circles ==
A recumbent stone circle is a type of stone circle constructed in the early Bronze Age. The identifying feature is that the largest stone (the recumbent) is always laid horizontally, with its long axis generally aligned with the perimeter of the ring between the south and southwest. A flanker stone stands each side of the recumbent and these are typically the tallest stones in the circle, with the smallest being situated on the northeastern aspect. The rest of the circle is usually composed of between six and ten orthostats graded by size. The builders tended to select a site which was on a level spur of a hill with excellent views to other landmarks. Over seventy of these circles are found in lowland Aberdeenshire in northeast Scotland – the most similar monuments are the axial stone circles of southwest Ireland. Recumbent stone circles generally enclosed a low ring cairn, though over the millennia these have often disappeared. They may have been a development from the Clava cairns found nearby in Inverness-shire and axial stone circles may have followed the design. Whilst cremated remains have been found at some sites, the precise function of these circles is not known.

== History ==
The Dunnideer stone circle is thought to have been created in the Neolithic age. Several stones are known to have been removed in the 19th century. In John Lesley's Historie of Scotland (1578) he wrote of the circle "Is thair lykwyse a wondirful gret croune of stanes, quhilke rings agane, na vthirwyse than with ane eccho in brasse or coppir". (Note: As translated from Latin to Scots by Dalrymple in 1888. The idea for the quote and the full title of the book is as given by Welfare. In English "Is there likewise a wonderful great crown of stones, once more a circular fort, not otherwise than with an echo in brass or copper".) It was described as a "druidical circle" but by the 1820s, when it was sketched by James Skene, it had only three or possibly four orthostats. By 1867, the Ordnance Survey reported that there were only three stones. In a paper published in 1902, Frederick Coles confirmed there were three stones and remarked that they were "much disfigured by an accumulation of weeds and rubbish". He also noted that there were several other stone circles and standing stones close by. In a paper published in 1985, Aubrey Burl and Clive Ruggles posited an alternative theory that there were only ever three stones.

The stones are of gabbro and those still standing are the recumbent and its two flankers. The recumbent stands erected and is 2.80 metres (9.19 ft) long, 1.95 metres (6.40 ft) tall and 0.50 metres (1.640 ft) wide. The two flanker stones have been re-erected: the eastern one stands 2.25 metres (7.38 ft) tall, 1.00 metre (3.28 ft) broad and 0.85 metres (2.789 ft) wide; the western one is 2.00 metres (6.56 ft) long, 1.00 metre (3.28 ft) tall and 0.52 metres (1.706 ft) wide. The latter has split along its length.

The circle became a scheduled monument in 1925.

== See also ==
- List of recumbent stone circles
