= Tyrebagger stone circle =

Stone circle in Aberdeen, Scotland

Tyrebagger
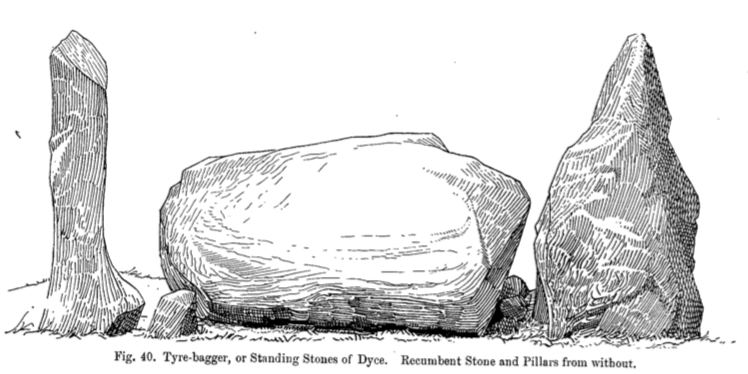
- 1900 sketch

- Location within Aberdeen City council area
- Interactive map of Tyrebagger
- 57.209503°N 2.2342244°W
- Type: Recumbent stone circle
- Location: Scotland
- Region: Aberdeen
- OS grid reference: NJ859132

Site notes
- Public access: Yes

Scheduled monument
- Official name: Standingstones
- Type: Prehistoric ritual and funerary: stone circle or ring
- Designated: 17 August 1925
- Reference no.: SM22

Tyrebagger stone circle is a complete recumbent stone circle at Dyce, near Aberdeen, Scotland. It was used as a cattle pound in the past and now stands close to the Aberdeen Western Peripheral Route. It has been a scheduled monument since 1925.

== Recumbent stone circles ==
A recumbent stone circle is a type of stone circle constructed in the early Bronze Age. The identifying feature is that the largest stone (the recumbent) is always laid horizontally, with its long axis generally aligned with the perimeter of the ring between the south and southwest. A flanker stone stands each side of the recumbent and these are typically the tallest stones in the circle, with the smallest being situated on the northeastern aspect. The rest of the circle is usually composed of between six and ten orthostats graded by size. The builders tended to select a site which was on a level spur of a hill with excellent views to other landmarks. Over seventy of these circles are found in lowland Aberdeenshire in northeast Scotland – the most similar monuments are the axial stone circles of southwest Ireland. Recumbent stone circles generally enclosed a low ring cairn, though over the millennia these have often disappeared. They may have been a development from the Clava cairns found nearby in Inverness-shire and axial stone circles may have followed the design. Whilst cremated remains have been found at some sites, the precise function of these circles is not known.

== Description ==
Tyrebagger stone circle stands on a hill above the Standingstones farm at Dyce near to Aberdeen. It is one of the few examples of a complete recumbent stone circle and measures about 18.5 metres in diameter. It is composed of eleven stones: the 24 ton recumbent stone is grey granite and the orthostats are red granite. Aubrey Burl believed the stones came from a nearby quarry. The site became a scheduled monument in 1925.

== History ==
In the past, the stone circle was converted for use as a cattle pound by digging out the interior and filling in the areas between the orthostats with loose stones. In 1896 there were twelve stones and two nearby two cairns, and one of the cairns was demolished in that year.

Frederick Coles stated in a paper published in 1900 that the circle, which he called the standing stones of Dyce, had twelve stones. When the Ordnance Survey visited the circle 1865-6, the surveyors recorded ten stones. Another visit from a surveyor in 1961 reported one stone had cracked into two pieces. This was re-erected in 1999. The Aberdeen Western Peripheral Route was constructed nearby in the 2010s.

== See also ==
- List of recumbent stone circles
