= Blue cairn circle =

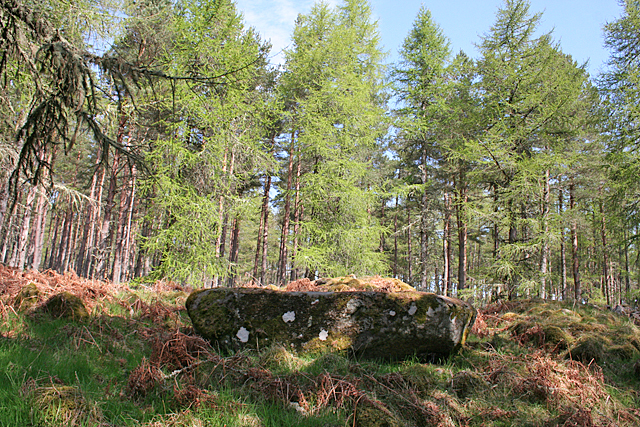
- The Blue Cairn of Ladieswell in May 2016.
- Interactive map of Blue cairn circle
- 57.143796°N 2.974964°W
- Location: Aberdeenshire, Scotland

Site notes
- Architectural style: British pre-Roman Architecture

Scheduled monument
- Official name: Blue Cairn
- Type: Prehistoric ritual and funerary: long cairn
- Designated: 3 March 1964
- Reference no.: SM2387

Blue cairn circle, also known as the Blue Cairn of Ladieswell, is a 21 metres (69 ft) diameter recumbent stone circle in Aberdeenshire, Scotland. In the center is a large stone cairn with several pits in it.

== Recumbent stone circles ==
A recumbent stone circle is a type of stone circle constructed in the early Bronze Age. The identifying feature is that the largest stone (the recumbent) is always laid horizontally, with its long axis generally aligned with the perimeter of the ring between the south and southwest. A flanker stone stands each side of the recumbent and these are typically the tallest stones in the circle, with the smallest being situated on the northeastern aspect. The rest of the circle is usually composed of between six and ten orthostats graded by size. The builders tended to select a site which was on a level spur of a hill with excellent views to other landmarks. Over seventy of these circles are found in lowland Aberdeenshire in northeast Scotland – the most similar monuments are the axial stone circles of southwest Ireland. Recumbent stone circles generally enclosed a low ring cairn, though over the millennia these have often disappeared. They may have been a development from the Clava cairns found nearby in Inverness-shire and axial stone circles may have followed the design. Whilst cremated remains have been found at some sites, the precise function of these circles is not known.

== Description ==
Historic Environment Scotland archaeologists describe this recumbent stone circle as "mutilated". It is located in woodland near Logie Coldstone in Aberdeenshire. The circle is distinguished by having a large cairn inside it and the recumbent is 3.60 metres long and 0.90 metres tall. It was painted by William Cormack in 1942.

== See also ==
- List of recumbent stone circles
