= Recumbent =

Recumbent may refer to:

- Recumbence, the act or state of lying down or leaning
- Recumbent bicycle, a bicycle, tricycle or quadricycle which places the rider in a reclined or supine position
- Recumbent effigy, a tomb sculpture of the deceased
- Recumbent stone circles, a variation on the more familiar standard stone circles found throughout the UK
