= Cecil Coles =

Scottish composer

Cecil Frederick Gottlieb Coles (7 October 1888 – 26 April 1918) was a Scottish composer who was killed on active service in World War I.

== Life and career ==
Coles was born in Tongland, near Kirkcudbright, to Frederick Coles and Margaret Coles (née Blacklock), and was educated at George Watson's School, Edinburgh. In 1907 he went to the London College of Music on a scholarship. He later studied at the University of Edinburgh and Stuttgart Conservatory. On completion of his studies, he became assistant conductor to the Stuttgart Royal Opera and was organist of St. Katherine's, an English church in the city. In 1912, he married Phoebe Relton at St Saviour's Church, Brockley Rise, London, and took his wife back to Germany; the couple returned to the UK the following year.

When World War I broke out, he joined the Queen Victoria's Rifles and became their bandmaster. While on active service, he sent manuscripts home to his friend Gustav Holst. He was killed by German sniper fire on the Western Front, while helping recover casualties. He was buried at Crouy. Holst dedicated his composition, Ode to Death Op. 38, to Coles.

Coles' work was "rediscovered" in a 2001 recording. His music was used as the opening and closing title music for a 2003 Channel 4 documentary series entitled The First World War. The piece of music was Cortège, arranged by Orlando Gough. Cortège is one of the two surviving movements of a suite composed by Coles called Behind the Lines. Cortege also appears on Artists Rifles, an audiobook CD issued in 2004 featuring war poetry read by Siegfried Sassoon, Edmund Blunden, Robert Graves, David Jones, Edgell Rickword and Lawrence Binyon, as well as music by Edward Elgar, George Butterworth, Ralph Vaughan Williams, Maurice Ravel, Gustav Holst, Ivor Gurney, Ernest Moeran and Arthur Bliss.

A recording of piano music by Cecil Coles, including the two movement sonata from 1908, was released in 2021, played by James Willshire.

== Works ==
=== Orchestral ===
- From the Scottish Highlands (suite) (1906–1907)
- Fra Giacomo (dramatic scena for baritone and orchestra, to a poem by Robert Williams Buchanan) (1914)
- Scherzo in A minor
- Overture: The Comedy of Errors
- Sorrowful Dance
- Behind the Lines

=== Piano ===
- Five Little Variations on an Original Theme (1908)
- Sonata in C minor (c 1908)
- Variations on an Original Theme (1908)
- Rondo in A minor (1909)
- Five Sketches (pub. 1910)
- Intermezzo (1911)
- Trianon Gavotte
- Triste et Gai
- Valse in D

=== Songs ===
- Four Verlaine Songs
