= Strichen stone circle =

Stone circle in Aberdeenshire, Scotland

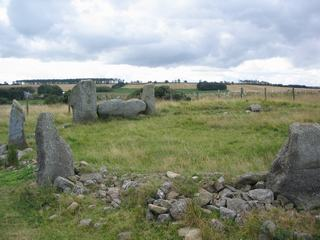
- Strichen in 2006

- Location within Aberdeenshire
- 57.5804°N 2.1074°W
- Type: Recumbent stone circle
- Periods: Neolithic
- Location: Scotland
- Region: Aberdeenshire

Site notes
- Excavation dates: 1979–1982
- Archaeologists: Aubrey Burl, Philip Abramson, Iain Hampsher-Monk
- Public access: Yes

Strichen stone circle is a Megalithic recumbent stone circle located near Strichen, Aberdeenshire in the north east of Scotland. It has been destroyed twice and in the early 1980s was excavated and reconstructed.

== General description ==
Strichen stone circle stands on a hill close to the ruins of Strichen House, near the village of Strichen in Aberdeenshire. In its present state, it contains seven orthostats plus the recumbent stone and its two flankers. The recumbent is around 2.6 metres (8.5 ft) long and 1.05 metres (3.4 ft) tall and is orientated on the south-south-east side of the circle.

== Investigations and relocations ==
The circle was visited in 1758 by James Boswell with his father. Boswell then returned with Samuel Johnson in 1773, because the lexicographer was interested in seeing a "Druid's Temple". There were four stones standing and Johnson was more impressed by the local woods. The ring was completely destroyed around 1830 by a tenant farmer, who was then compelled to rebuild it by the owner of the land (and Strichen House) Thomas Alexander Fraser. The circle was rebuilt, but in the wrong place, within a ring bank where an Iron Age timber building had stood. It was then formed into a folly with six standing stones.

Alexander Thom produced a plan of the circle with its six stones in 1956; the ring had become a tea garden used by tuberculosis sufferers recovering at Strichen House (which subsequently closed down in 1958). In the 1960s, the circle was destroyed for a second time when the trees surrounding it were felled. After the local council launched an appeal to rebuild it, a major excavation and renovation was organised. Between 1979 and 1982, excavations led by Aubrey Burl, Philip Abramson and Iain Hampsher-Monk took place. Items found included hammer stones, rubbing stones and beaker fragments. It was determined that whilst the recumbent stood in the right place, the rest of the circle was in the wrong position. The restoration of the circle has been questioned by Adam Welfare, who writes that the smallest orthostat is standing on the north-north-west side of the ring, not the north-north-east side as is typical. The volunteer labourers found that the most efficient way to move the orthostats was to slide them on logs with dry straw underneath. By 2003, one of the stones re-erected in 1982 had fallen over.

== See also ==
- List of recumbent stone circles
