= Inschfield stone circle =

Recumbent stone circle in Aberdeenshire, Scotland

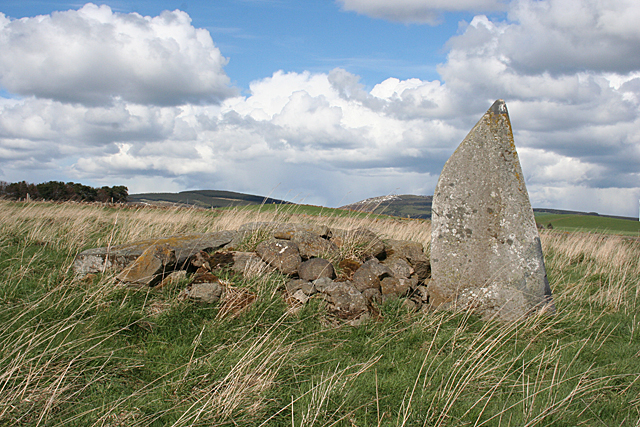
- Stone circle 2015
- Interactive map of Inschfield stone circle
- 57.353120°N 2.6277447°W
- Type: Recumbent stone circle
- Periods: Neolithic
- Location: Aberdeenshire, Scotland

History
- Built: c. 4000-2500 BC

Site notes
- Material: Stone
- Diameter: 27.4 m (90 ft)

Scheduled monument
- Official name: Inschfield stone circle
- Type: Prehistoric ritual and funerary: stone circle or ring
- Designated: 17 August 1925
- Reference no.: SM25

Inschfield stone circle is a ruined recumbent stone circle situated near Insch, Aberdeenshire. Only three of the stones, including the broken recumbent stone, remain. The diameter of the original stone circle had a diameter of approximately 27.4 m (90 ft).

The remains of the stone circle are a designated scheduled monument.

== See also ==
- Scheduled monuments in Aberdeenshire
