= Old Deer =

Coordinates: 57°31′9″N 2°2′12″W

Old Deer: Scottish Gaelic: Dèir; Scots: Auld Deer
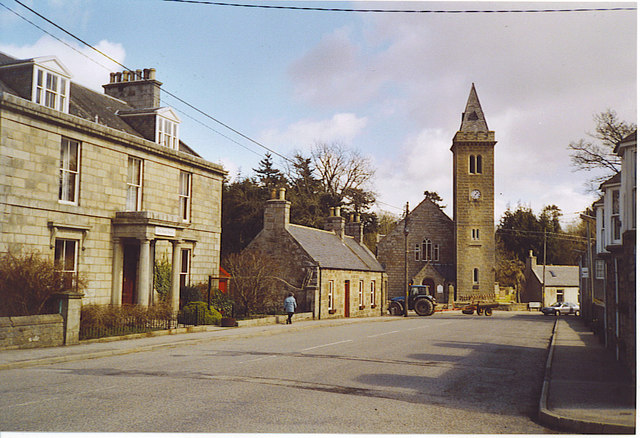
- Abbey Street in Old Deer, with the parish church in view

- Location within Aberdeenshire
- Population: 152 (2011)
- OS grid reference: NJ976477
- Council area: Aberdeenshire
- Lieutenancy area: Aberdeenshire
- Country: Scotland
- Sovereign state: United Kingdom
- Post town: PETERHEAD
- Postcode district: AB42
- Police: Scotland
- Fire: Scottish
- Ambulance: Scottish
- UK Parliament: Gordon and Buchan
- Scottish Parliament: Aberdeenshire East

Old Deer (Scots: Auld Deer, Scottish Gaelic: Dèir) is a parish and village in the district of Buchan, Aberdeenshire, Scotland. The population in 2011 was 152. The village lies on the A950, beside the Deer or South Ugie Water, 10.1 miles (16.3 km) west of Peterhead and 2 miles (3 km) from Mintlaw. Industries include distilling, brewing, and the manufacture of woollens, and there are quarries of granite and limestone.

The village of New Deer (formerly called Auchreddie) lies about 7 miles (11 km) west of the older village; to the north of New Deer is the ruined Fedderate Castle.

== Etymology ==
The name Deer is likely to be of Pictish origin. The name involves the element *deru meaning "oak" (cf. Gaelic dair or darach; cf. Welsh derw; compare Dairsie).

== History ==
The parish records spell the name in various other ways such as Deare, Diere and Dier.

Columba and his nephew Drostan founded a monastery here in 719, of which no trace remains. The Book of Deer is a most interesting relic of the monks, which was discovered in 1857 in the Cambridge University library by Henry Bradshaw. It was probably stolen during the Wars of Scottish Independence by English troops. It is a small manuscript of the Gospels in the Vulgate, fragments of the liturgy of the Celtic church, and notes, in the Gaelic script of the 12th century, referring to the charters of the ancient monastery, including a summary of that granted by David I of Scotland. These are among the oldest examples of Scottish Gaelic. The manuscript is also adorned with Gaelic designs. It had belonged to the monks of Deer and been in the possession of the University Library since 1715. It was edited by John Stuart for the Spalding Club, by whom it was published in 1869 under the title The Book of Deer (Leabhar Dhèir in Gaelic).

In 1218 William Comyn, earl of Buchan, founded the Abbey of St Mary of Deer, now in ruins, 3/4 mile (1.2 km) farther up the river than the monastery and on the opposite bank. Although it was erected for Cistercians from the priory of Kinloss, near Forres, the property of the Columban monastery was removed to it. The founder (died 1233) and he and his countess were buried in the church. The parish is rich in antiquities, but the most noted of them is the Stone of Deer, a sculptured block of syenite, which stood near the abbey; it was destroyed in 1854.

Deer Parish Church dates to 1788. Its tower, with pyramid spire, was designed by George Reid. Internal fittings were by Alexander Marshall Mackenzie. Ruins of its predecessor survive in the grounds.

Across Abbey Street is St Drostan's Episcopal Church, dating to 1851. Its roof has a bellcote at its western end.

== Aikey Brae stone circle ==
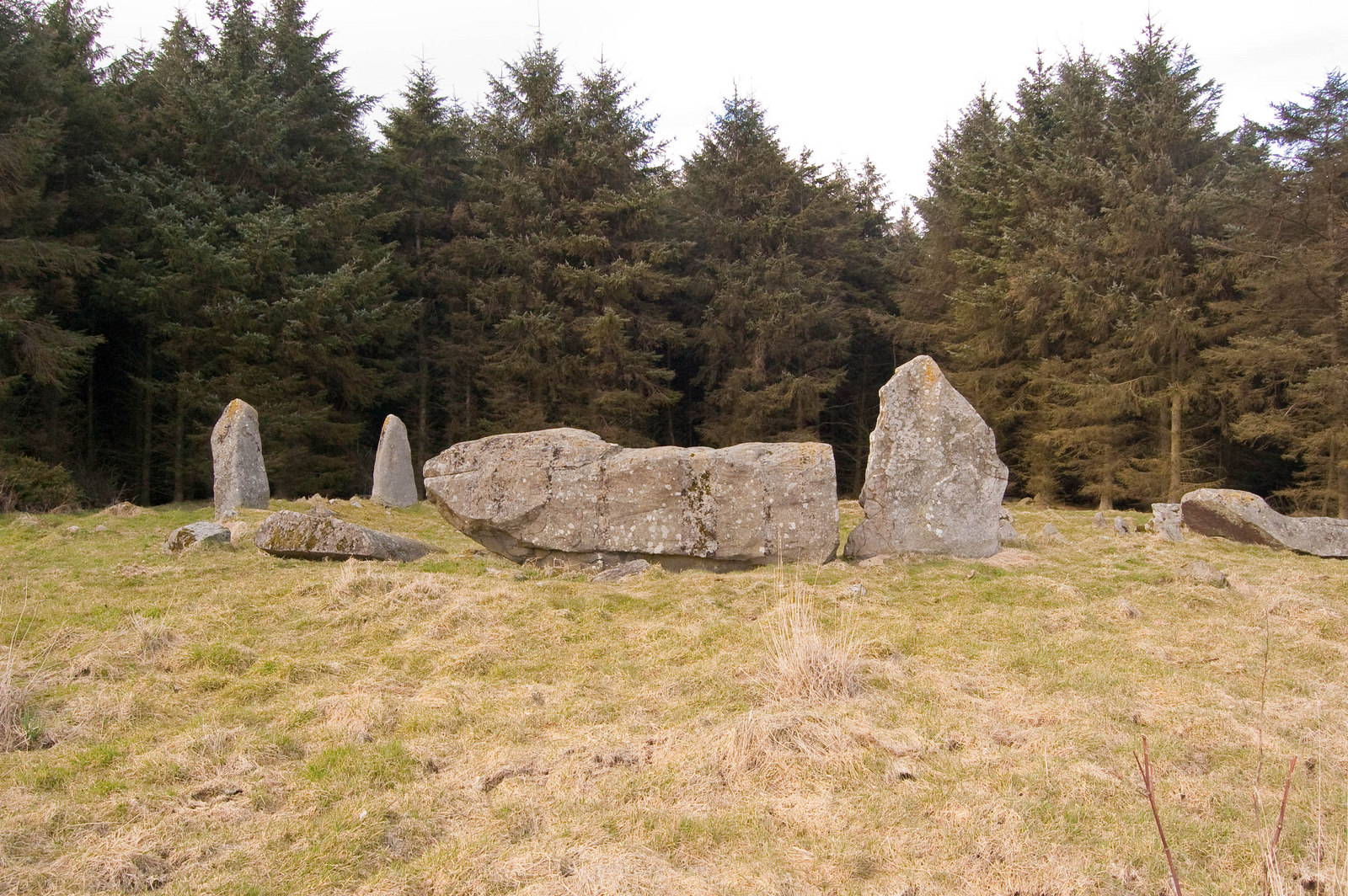
Aikey Brae stone circle

Aikey Brae stone circle lies between Maud and Old Deer on the summit of Parkhouse Hill. It is a recumbent stone circle and was most recently excavated by Chris Ball and Richard Bradley in 2001. It is a scheduled monument.

== Notable people ==
- David B. Henderson, one of only two foreign-born Speakers of the United States House of Representatives.

== See also ==
- Abbot of Deer
- Deer Abbey

== Bibliography ==
- This article incorporates text from a publication now in the public domain: Chisholm, Hugh, ed. (1911). "Old Deer". Encyclopædia Britannica. Vol. 20 (11th ed.). Cambridge University Press. p. 69.
- McKean, Charles (1990), Banff & Buchan, Royal Incorporation of Architects in Scotland, ISBN 978-1-85158-231-0
