= Tomnaverie stone circle =

Recumbent stone circle in Aberdeenshire

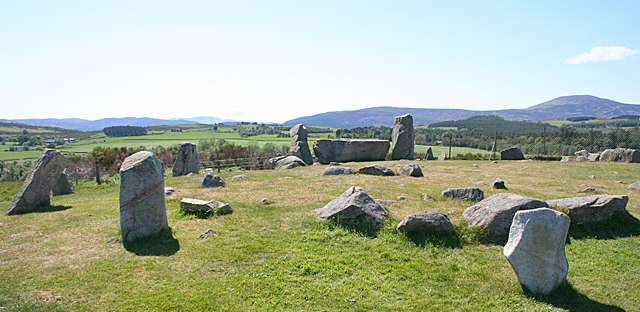
- Tomnaverie stone circle and its recumbent setting, 2011
- Interactive map of Tomnaverie stone circle
- 57.119411°N 2.8495541°W
- Type: Recumbent stone circle
- Periods: Bronze Age
- Location: Scotland, United Kingdom

History
- Built: c. 2500 BC

Site notes
- Management: Historic Environment Scotland
- Public access: Yes
- Website: Historic

Scheduled monument
- Official name: Tomnaverie Stone Circle
- Type: Prehistoric ritual and funerary: cairn
- Designated: 31 May 1927
- Reference no.: SM90303

The Tomnaverie stone circle is a recumbent stone circle set on the top of a small hill in lowland northeast Scotland. Construction started around 2500 BC, in the Bronze Age, to produce a monument of thirteen granite stones including a massive 6.5-ton recumbent stone lying on its side along the southwest of the circle's perimeter. Within the 17-metre (56 ft) circle are kerb stones encircling a low 15-metre (49 ft) ring cairn but the cairn itself no longer exists.

By 1930 Tomnaverie had fallen into a very dilapidated state, in good measure because it had been encroached on by a neighbouring quarry. Only four stones were still standing and many of the others were missing. In that year the monument was put into state guardianship but this merely stopped the destruction and made for no improvements. In 1999 an archaeological excavation commenced investigating how the circle had been constructed. Also, so far as possible, the monument would be returned closer to its original condition. This was very successful and the stone circle is now only missing two standing stones.

The excavation showed the cairn seems to have been constructed so as to prepare the way for the circle to be added in a pre-arranged alignment – this has since been demonstrated for other recumbent circles. It had previously been expected the cairn would have been built after the circle. This new discovery has made it doubtful that astronomical observations could have been made from within the circle or that the circle had been intended to have any precise orientation.

== Recumbent stone circles ==
A recumbent stone circle is a type of stone circle constructed in the early Bronze Age. The identifying feature is that the largest stone (the recumbent) is always laid horizontally, with its long axis generally aligned with the perimeter of the ring between the south and southwest. A flanker stone stands each side of the recumbent and these are typically the tallest stones in the circle, with the smallest being situated on the northeastern aspect. The rest of the circle is usually composed of between six and ten orthostats graded by size. The builders tended to select a site which was on a level spur of a hill with excellent views to other landmarks.

Over seventy of these circles are found in lowland Aberdeenshire in northeast Scotland – the most similar monuments are the axial stone circles of southwest Ireland. Recumbent stone circles generally enclosed a low ring cairn, though over the millennia these have often disappeared. They may have been a development from the Clava cairns found nearby in Inverness-shire and axial stone circles may have followed the design. Whilst cremated remains have been found at some sites, the precise function of these circles is not known.

== General description of Tomnaverie ==
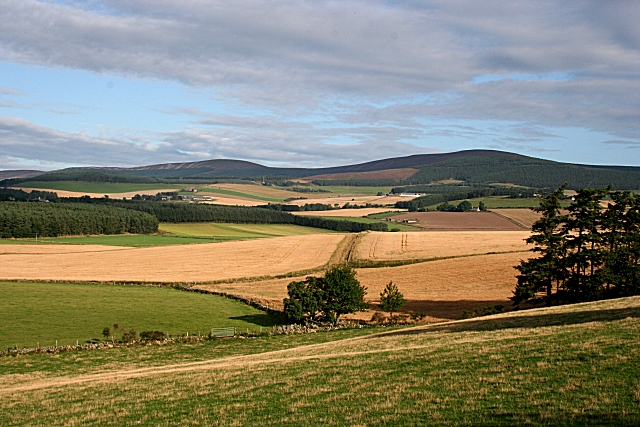
Howe of Cromar

This recumbent stone circle is situated at the top of a small hill about 1 kilometre (0.6 mi) south of Tarland in Aberdeenshire. There is a visitors' car park from where it is a short uphill walk to the monument. The 178-metre (584 ft) hill is of granite, barely covered by thin soil. The area, called the Howe of Cromar, (Note: In Scots, howe is a broad valley.) is surrounded by hills and mountains, most notably Lochnagar about 30 kilometres (19 mi) to the southwest, and Morven and Clachnaben. The circle is 17 metres (56 ft) across with the recumbent stone and its adjacent flankers looking southwest. The recumbent is a granite block 3.2 by 1 by 1.15 metres (10.5 ft × 3.3 ft × 3.8 ft) (length x thickness x height) and weighing 6.5 metric tons (7.2 short tons). The granite is intruded with quartz so as a whole this massive stone has a lighter colour than its attendant stones. It has two cup marks, one on its top and the other on its outer face. Depending on how it is measured, the orientation of the recumbent stone, looking out of the circle, is 236°–240° (southwest by west). (Note: According to Coles in 1905, when the recumbent had already been tipped over, the alignment was at 245°.)

Regarding the flankers, the eastern one is 1.8 metres (5 ft 11 in) high and weighs 2.5 metric tons (2.8 short tons) and the western is 1.9 metres (6 ft 3 in) high and weighs 3.5 metric tons (3.9 short tons). Apart from the recumbent and flankers, originally there were ten other stones but two of these, both to the northwest, are now missing. A stone to the southeast is light grey in colour whereas the others, and the flankers, are pale red. (Note: This grey stone was found in the quarry and was replaced following the excavation – it was a very good fit to the excavated socket.) The ring reduces in height from the flankers to those at the opposite side of the ring and the spaces between the stones also become reduced. The shortest stone is at the north-northeast, not quite opposite the recumbent, but it appears as if its top has been broken off.

The circle is located on a constructed platform of stones up to 24 metres (79 ft) across and 0.6 metres (2 ft 0 in) high. On top of this there is a 15-metre (49 ft) polygonal cairn surrounded by a granite kerb of slabs and blocks. In the southwest, rather than continuing as a rough circle, the kerb turns outwards so as to meet the sides of the recumbent setting. (Note: Two of the kerb stones are cup-marked – one on its top and the other stone with two cup marks on its outer face.)

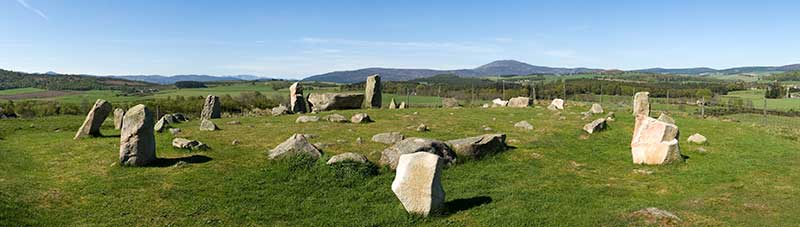

== 19th- and 20th-century developments ==
In 1792 the First Statistical Account of Scotland reported:

About a mile and a half west of the manor is to be seen the remains of a Druidical temple. The place is called Tamnaverie which signifies the Hill of Worship; but there is nothing to be seen but a few large stones, some of them standing upright, others fallen down, without any appearance of figures or inscription.

— Sir John Sinclair, 1st Baronet, 1792 (Note: The stone circle was named after the hill it crowned. The spelling has changed from Tamnaverie, to Tom-naverie, to Tomnaverie over the years.)

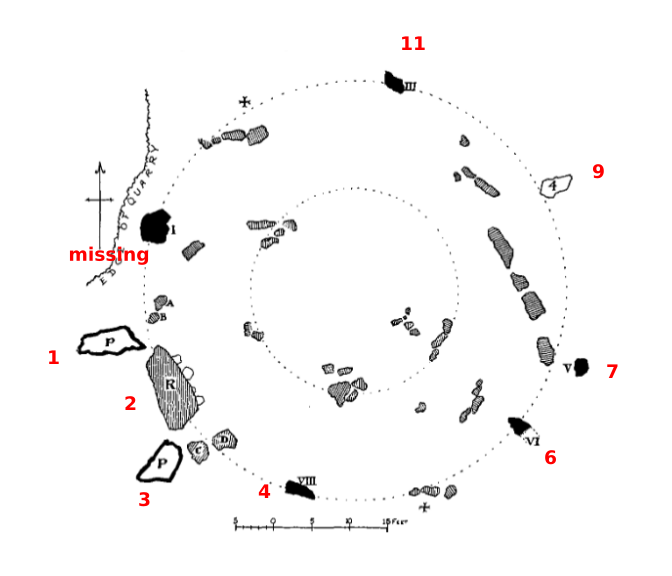
Coles' plan drawn in 1905, Bradley's 2005 numbers in red

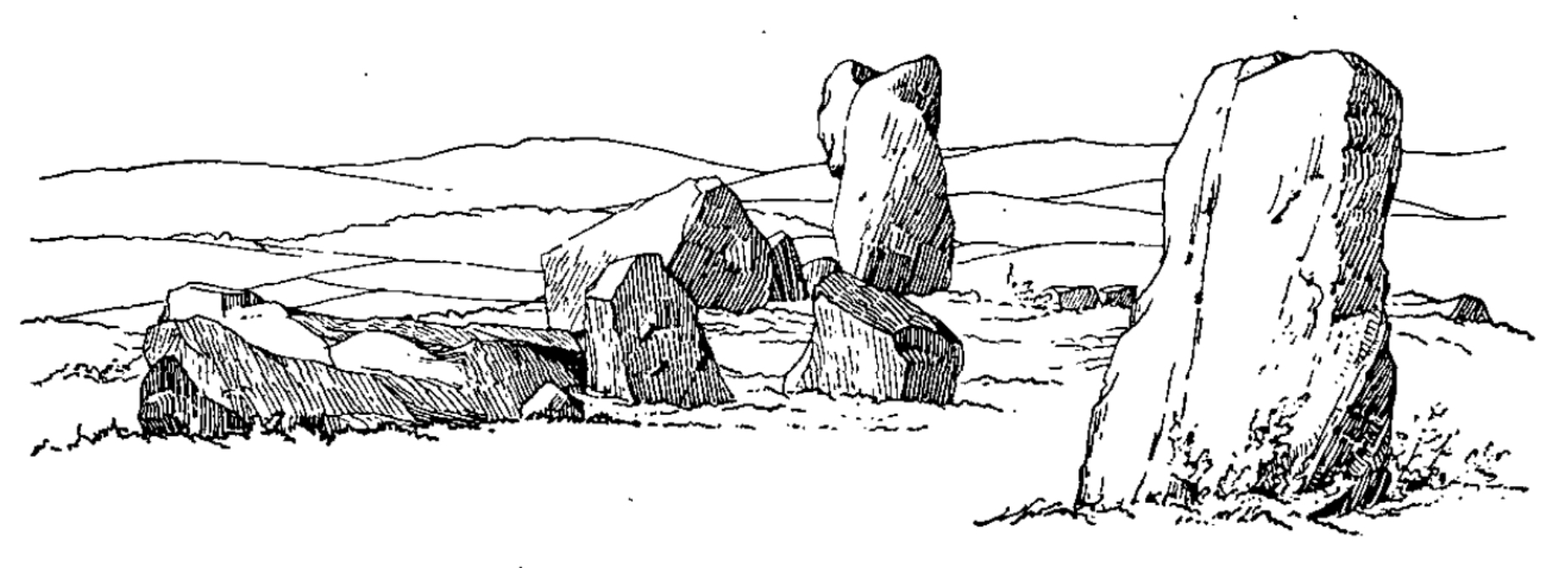
Sketch by Coles, 1905, showing eastern flanker on the ground (left), recumbent (centre), stone I (now missing) and stone VIII (right foreground)

In 1852, John Stuart wrote of "two circles of large erect stones", which puzzled Frederick Coles in 1905 who was not sure whether this meant two separate circles or one monument of two concentric rings. Coles discovered the circle smothered in broom shrubbery and with a quarry encroaching to within a metre (3 feet) of one of the standing stones. Despite the difficulties he surveyed the monument and found the recumbent stone to be aligned at 245°, much further round to the west that he had found with other circles. (Note: Coles noted the heights of the upright stones: I (now missing) 5'7", III 3'3", V 3'1", VI (leaning) 2'11", VIII 4'8".) There were merely indications of two concentric rings of stones. (Note: As it turned out, the third innermost ring Coles suspected was not thought to be such by the 2000 excavation.) He was alarmed about the condition of the circle and feared it would collapse even further. By 1916 one of the orthostats had fallen into the quarry and had then disappeared, and the archaeologist James Ritchie feared for the remaining stones.

In 1926 when there were only four stones still standing Alexander Keiller succeeded in getting the quarrying stopped after what he wrote was the "hectic riot which I created in the quarry last summer" with the landowner Lord Aberdeen. Keillor also got the monument made a scheduled monument in 1927 and taken into official state guardianship in 1930. State care meant little more than erecting a fence and keeping the grass cut. With Aubrey Burl in 1995 writing "Tomnaverie, ... a once fine recumbent stone circle, is a wreck ... its stones are now a jumble", Tomnaverie was chosen as the site for a major archaeological excavation in 1999 and 2000 led by Richard Bradley. Not only was the site to be closely investigated but also, so far as possible, it would subsequently be restored to something more like its original condition with its stones re-erected in their original sockets.

== Condition before excavation in 1999 ==
Apart from general deterioration over the millennia, the quarrying operations had led directly to serious damage. The face of the quarry wall was right next to the west of the circle, extending from northwest to southwest, so the workers in the quarry had possibly tipped the recumbent over onto its inside face and into the circle to avoid the risk of it falling into the quarry. Both flankers had been pulled vertically from their sockets and had fallen over outwards from the circle. The western one had then slipped down into the quarry. There were still traces of the ring cairn but at the centre of it nothing was evident.

== Archaeological excavation ==
Diagram showing status of circle between 1999 and 2000

The excavation took place over the 1999 and 2000 seasons, not so much to carry out a complete excavation, but with the purpose of establishing the chronological history of the structure. It started with an accurate and detailed photogrammetric survey. The remit also included advising on how the stone circle could eventually be displayed for the public.

With the turf and surface soil removed it became clear that the interior of the circle was much better preserved than had been expected. The excavation showed that the hilltop had first been used for pyres and eventually this created a mound of burnt residues, including cremated human bones. This mound had later been surrounded with rubble and boulders to form a polygonal cairn and the rubble had been extended further outward to make a roughly level platform over the summit of the hill.

In the area of the central cairn the stones Coles thought were an inner kerb turned out to be merely incidental rocks cleared from the fields. The cairn was indeed in the shape of a hollow ring with a central court left clear of stones but no inner kerb had been needed because the slope to the top of the hill held the boulders in place. An outer kerb was uncovered which had originally been continuous although only 19 stones still remained in place. Seven radial lines of boulders (Note: Or possibly up to thirteen radial lines.) were found lying like spokes dividing the cairn into segments. Where the ground was sloping steeply down to the southwest, terraces of turf and soil had been created, supported by boulders, to allow the cairn, faced on its perimeter with the kerb, to extend outwards in this direction in preparation for positioning the recumbent setting.

At the northeast of the circle six fragments of Beaker pottery were found beneath the outer platform by the base of the kerb (Note: The type of Beaker pottery can only be dated to 2300–1700 BC.) and radiocarbon dating of charcoal from under the cairn beneath the original position of the recumbent indicated around 2500–2450 BC, early Bronze Age. Also, fragments of late Bronze Age plain pottery and worked stones, including six flint blades, were unearthed. Few traces were found of people living in the immediate area of the circle – few artefacts were found – although by the Bronze Age the Howe of Cromar area had been partially cleared for cultivation. Field-walking by the archaeologists discovered as many as 29 cup-marked rocks in the general vicinity.

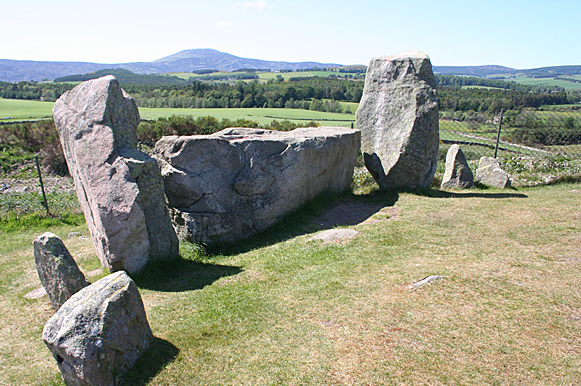
Recumbent and flankers, 2011

Once the ring cairn had been built the circle was constructed on top of the pre-prepared platform in a way that showed the cairn and platform had been deliberately designed to accommodate the stone circle. Moreover, the radial lines laid down before the uprights apparently tended to point to the places where the orthostats were later sited. The recumbent had been laid in a shallow hollow, supported with chock stones, and the orthostats had been lowered into sockets dug into the platform. Probably at the same time, the kerb of the cairn was reconfigured to turn outwards over the extended cairn to connect with the flankers and some large kerb stones were removed – those that had run beside the recumbent inside the circle. The orthostats seem to have been positioned in pairs to face each other at right angles to the axis through the recumbent. After the construction of the platform, cairn and stone circle, little seems to have happened until around 1000 BC from when there is again evidence of cremated bone fragments. In the 16th or 17th century AD a pit was dug in the middle of the cairn and the excavation found cremated bone here also.

== Reconstruction ==
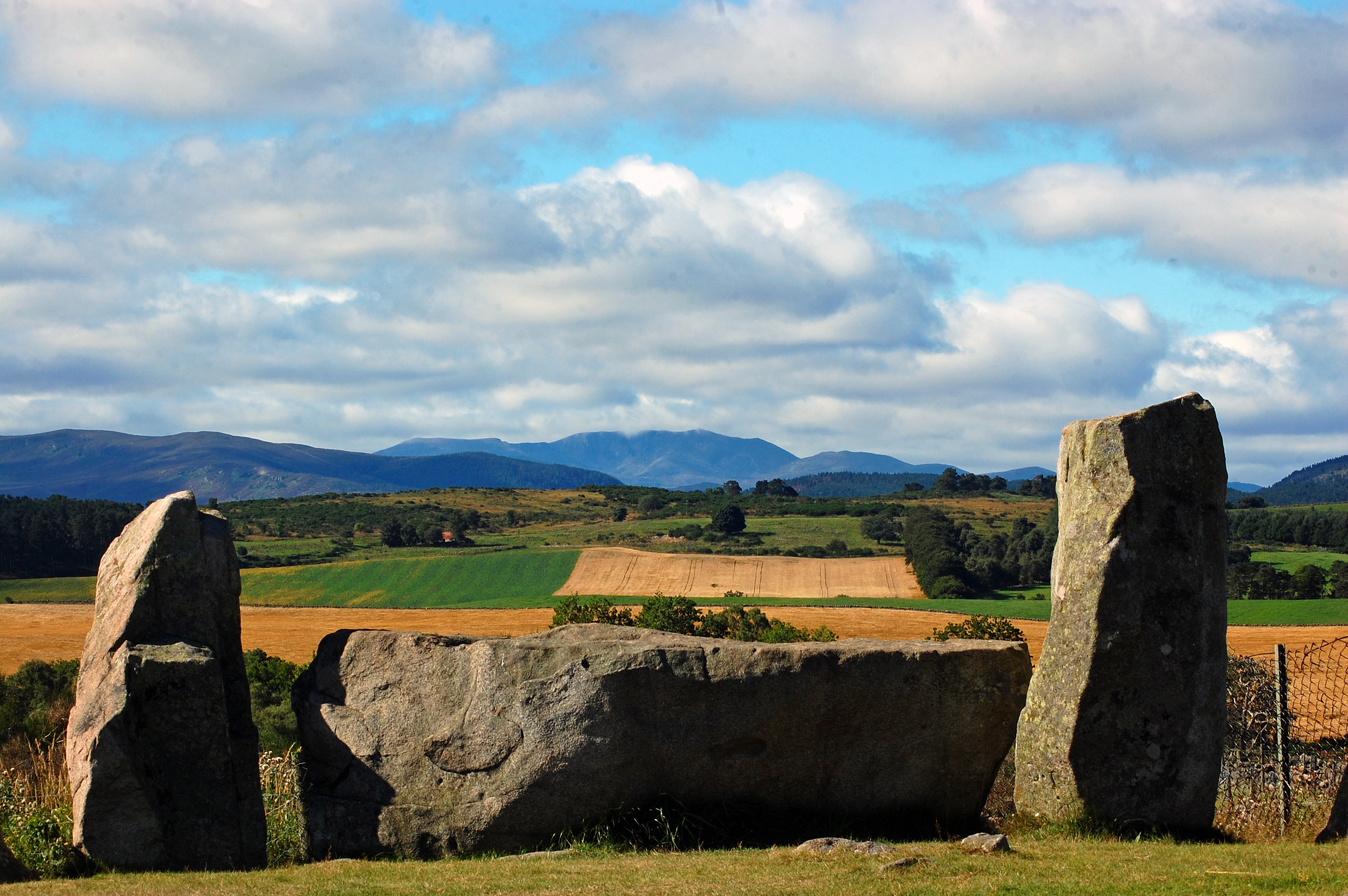
View over the repositioned recumbent stone to Lochnagar

The sockets of four of the missing uprights were found by the excavation – at the southeast (5), (Note: the numbers are those allocated by Bradley (2005) and are included in the diagram above.) east-northeast (8), north-northwest (12), and under a fallen slab at the northeast (9). Orthostat 8 was found buried beside its socket and orthostat 5 was found in the quarry itself. This stone had fallen before 1870 and was missing in 1904 and yet it was found unbroken in 1999. These three stones, and the two flankers, were lifted by crane and lowered into their sockets which fitted well. The stone at the west (13) could not be found. (Note: The missing number 13 is probably the stone Coles had found (and numbered I) and which was photographed in situ in 1910 but was missing by 1911 when the archaeologist was told it had been taken to form part of a wall of a house in Tarland.) The recumbent was turned and lifted back into place by crane. In its original position the recumbent was again precisely level.

In 2003 part of the quarry was back-filled (Note: Infilling was still in progress in 2015.) and the area was landscaped. When viewed from across the circle the recumbent, now restored to its original position, confirms Burl and Ruggles’ observation that the alignment points to the mountain Lochnagar. It is also the position where the full moon sets at midsummer at a time of minor lunar standstill though by 2013 Bradley was doubting the significance of this.

== Archaeological conclusions ==
The excavation showed that the circle was of the early Bronze Age in date – around 2500 BC. This had previously been thought likely but not certain. What was not expected was that the stone circle was built after the cairn. Moreover the circle's eventual construction had been preconceived in the building of the cairn. In recent years there have been theories that people could have assembled within the circle to make astronomical observations and celebrations – this now seems most unlikely. Two more excavations were carried out subsequently on other stone circles and a similar order of construction was found. There remains some doubt whether the stages of construction took place over a "relatively short duration" or whether they took "many generations". It does not seem the monument was primarily for burials.

An archaeoastronomical theory has been that the alignment of these circles was for viewing astronomical events from within the circle. Because it had previously been thought the central cairns had been built after, maybe long after, the circle there would have been a space inside for people to congregate. Following Bradley's discovery that in this case, and others, the cairn predated the circle, it is now according to Ruggles "difficult, if not impossible, to observe the moon in the way we have described". (Note: Welfare (2011, p. 206) quoting Ruggles (1999, p. 239, note 67)) There remains the idea that the alignment with Lochnagar on the far horizon was intentional but Henty remarks that the recumbent gets in the way of a view of the mountain from the opposite side of the circle.
