= Tarland =

Village in Aberdeenshire, Scotland

Coordinates: 57.129°N 2.859°W

Tarland: Scottish Gaelic: Turlann
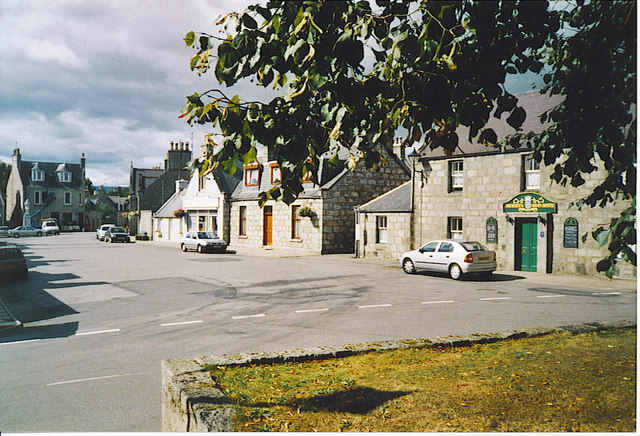

- Location within Aberdeenshire
- Population: 690 (2020)
- OS grid reference: NJ4799
- Council area: Aberdeenshire
- Country: Scotland
- Sovereign state: United Kingdom
- Postcode district: AB34
- Dialling code: 01339
- Police: Scotland
- Fire: Scottish
- Ambulance: Scottish

Tarland (Gaelic: Turlann) is a village in Aberdeenshire, Scotland 5 miles (8 km) northwest of Aboyne, and 30 miles (50 km) west of Aberdeen.

== Prehistory and archaeology ==
Tarland is home to the Culsh Earth House, an Iron Age below-ground dwelling otherwise known as a souterrain.

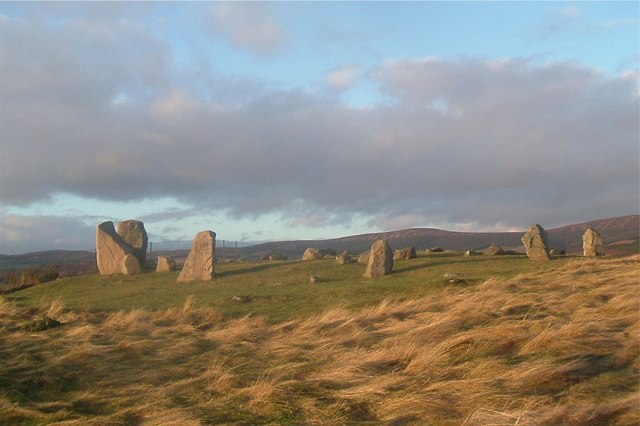
Tomnaverie stone circle

Just south of Tarland is the Tomnaverie stone circle, a 4,000-year-old recumbent stone circle. The site is a property in care of Historic Scotland.

Melgum Lodge near Tarland was originally built as a hunting lodge for the physician to Queen Victoria, who frequently stayed in the vicinity at Balmoral Castle.

== Notable people ==
- Admiral of the Fleet Sir Rhoderick Robert McGrigor retired to Tarland
- Alexander Starritt, author of the novel The Beast
- Alexander Boyd Stewart CBE FRSE (1904–1981), agriculturalist and soil scientist.
- Philippa Tattersall, British Army officer and the first woman to complete the All Arms Commando Course in May 2002.
