= Frederick Coles =

Archaeologist of stone circles in Scotland

Frederick Coles FSA Scot
- Born: Frederick Rhenius Coles; 1854; Bellary, East India
- Died: 1929 (aged 74–75)
- Occupations: Archaeologist, artist
- Years active: 1873–1910
- Spouses: Mary (unknown maiden name); Margaret Neilson Blacklock
- Children: Helen, Cecil, Muriel, Herbert, John

Frederick Coles FSA Scot (1854–1929) (Note: Welfare alternatively states born 1853. FSA Scot.) was an archaeologist, artist, naturalist and musician. For many years he worked as Assistant Keeper at the National Museum of Antiquities of Scotland in Edinburgh from where he was funded to make a series of annual field archaeology expeditions to survey and draw stone circles in Scotland.

== Life ==
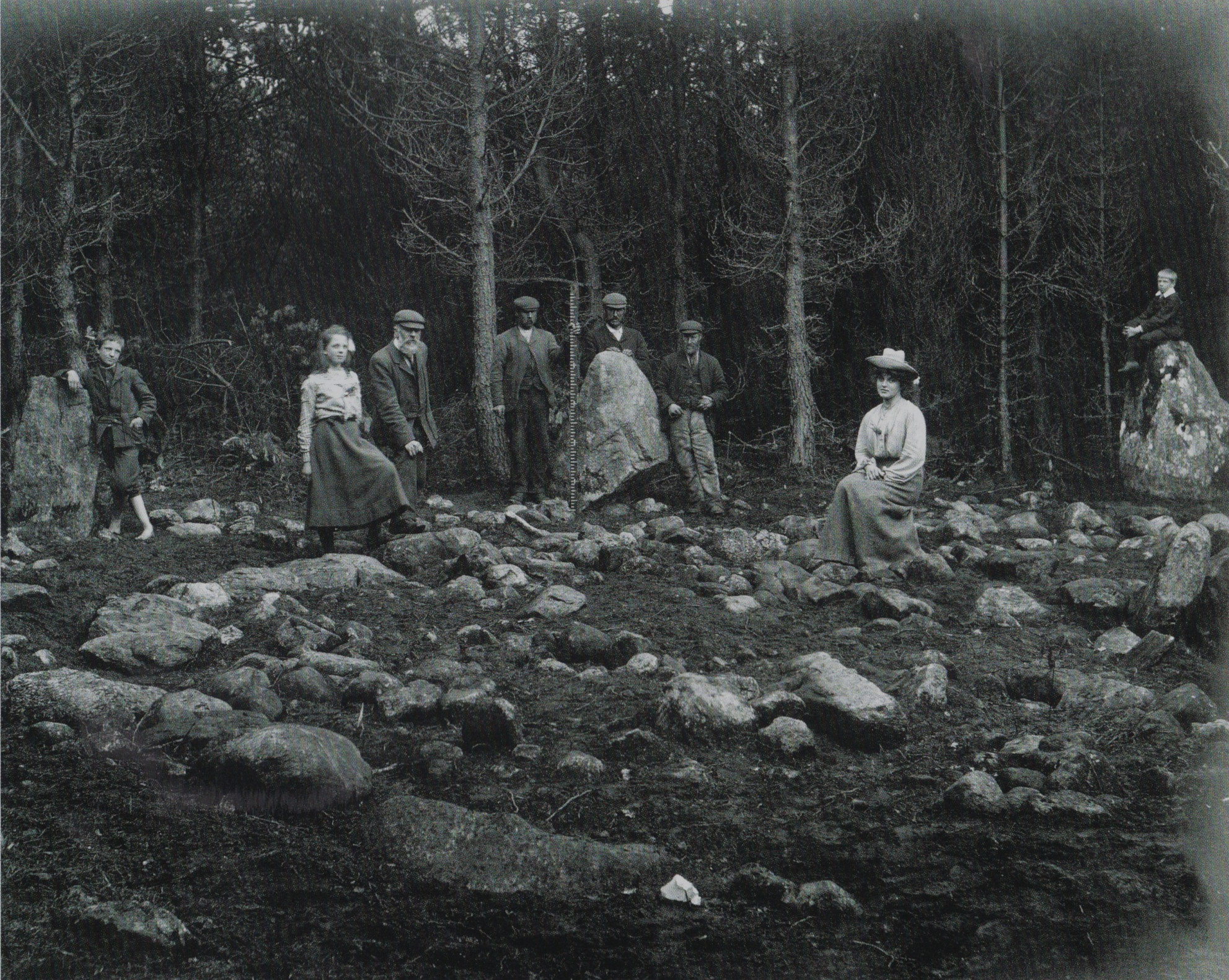
Coles and four of his children (1904) (Note: The photograph was taken by James Ritchie (Snr) (1850–1925) at Nine Stanes stone circle, near Banchory on 17 September 1904. From left to right: Cecil (aged 16), Muriel (15), Frederick (with beard), Helen (20, seated), John (12, extreme right). Three workmen in centre. Coles' son Herbert (13) is not present.)

Frederick Rhenius Coles was born in 1854 in Bellary, East India where his parents were missionaries. He was educated in Britain from the age of six being looked after by his extended family. At one time he attended Edinburgh Academy. In 1881 he was married to Mary and living in Tongland near Kirkcudbright. After his first wife died he married Margaret Neilson Blacklock (sister of the artist) of Kirkcudbright and they had two daughters and three sons. Coles died in 1929.

== Painting ==
He embarked on a career as an artist but little of his work has survived in public collections. In Kirkcudbright he was a landscape and marine painter, working between 1873 and 1889, an associate of Edward Hornel, Thomas Bromley Blacklock and the Kirkcudbright Artists' Colony. He exhibited at the Royal Scottish Academy in the period 1873 to 1879. He conducted for the Kirkcudbright Musical Association and his interest in music may have influenced his son Cecil F.G Coles to become a musician. He took an active part in the Kirkudbright Field Naturalists' Club and the Kirkubbright Fine Arts Association.

== Archaeology ==
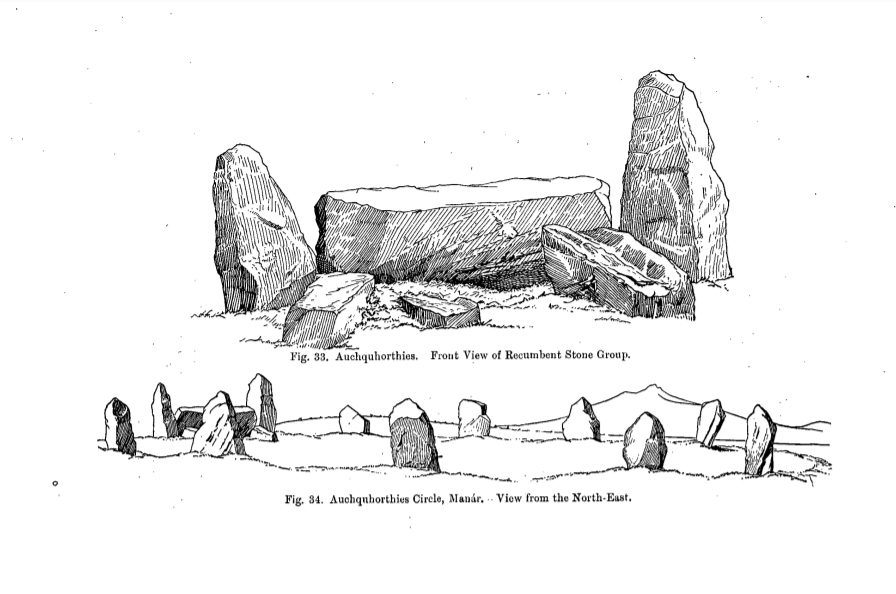
Example of Coles' drawings: Easter Aquorthies stone circle, 1900

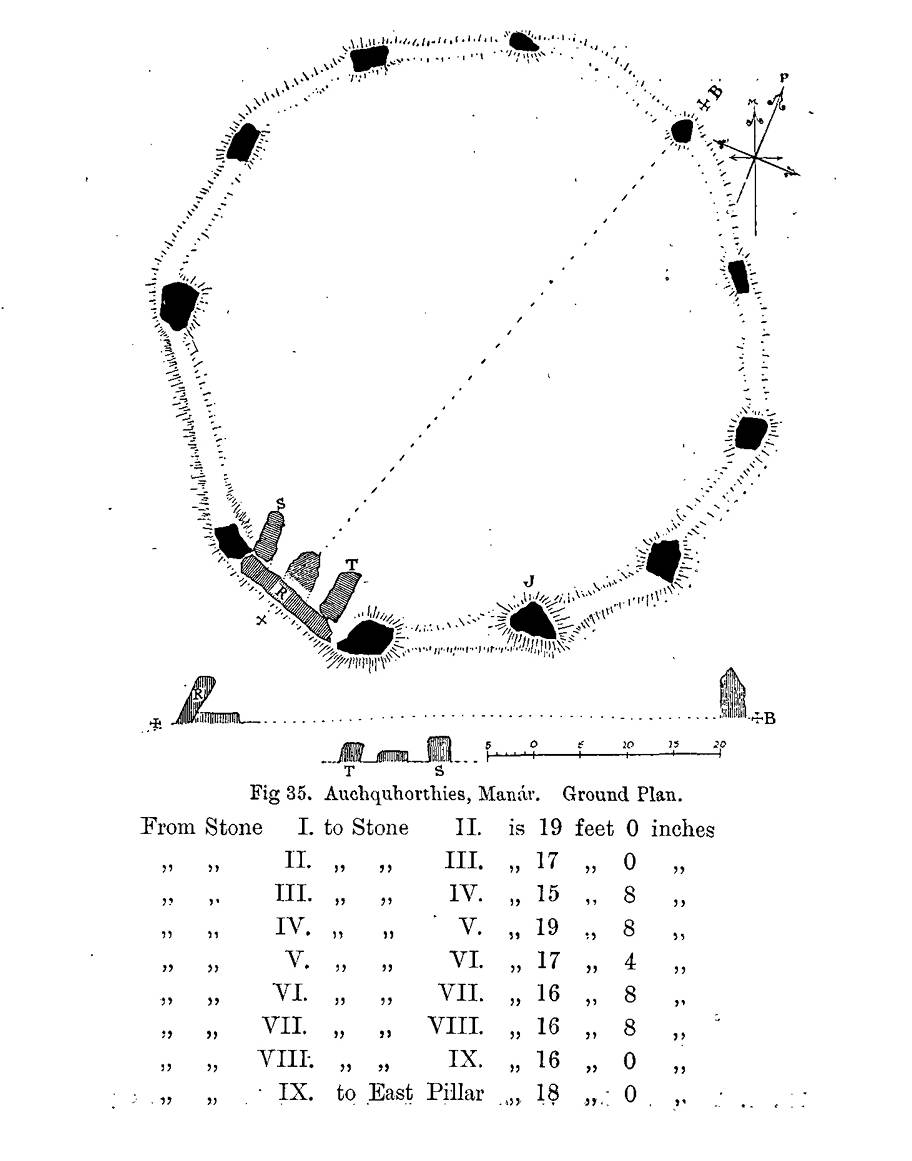
Coles' plan of the circle

He became interested in natural history and then field archaeology – in particular, castles, stone circles and cup markings on the stones. Eventually, he surveyed and drew over 130 stone circles and 60 castles across Scotland and from 1895 regularly published his surveys and drawings in the Proceedings of Scottish Antiquaries of Scotland – the journal of the Society of Antiquaries of Scotland – producing the first detailed descriptive catalogue of stone circles in Scotland. His drawings were accurate and meticulous – some are now kept at the Stewartry Museum in Kirkcudbright. (Note: The Stewartry Museum also holds his herbarium.)

His archaeological reputation led to his being invited to apply to become Assistant Keeper at the National Museum of Antiquities of Scotland in Queen Street, Edinburgh in 1899, working under the Keeper Joseph Anderson. Until 1910 he received annual Gunning Fellowships allowing him to embark on archaeological field trips every year and eventually taking his children along with him after his second wife’s death. (Note: "Gunning Fellowship" is the term informally used for an annual bursary instituted by Robert Halliday Gunning to "enable experts to visit other museums, collections, or materials of archaeological science at home or abroad, for the purpose of special investigation and research".) His children were able help him with taking measurements. Coles was the first person to highlight the contrasting colour of some of the stones, caused by the differing petrology, which was then neglected again until recent years. He was also the first archaeologist to speak to local inhabitants to try to understand the histories of the circles, including those that had been damaged or destroyed in living memory.

Coles was involved in two debt scandals but was exonerated from the first. In 1911 he was dismissed from the museum after another problem over debt for which he was convicted and served a sentence in Calton Prison.

Great Crowns of Stone, the 2011 RCAHMS book about the recumbent stone circles of Scotland is dedicated in memory of Coles. The author, Adam Welfare, considers Coles to be in the first rank of those investigating the Scottish stone circles, for example Tomnaverie stone circle. He says that Coles was disdainful of archaeoastronomy, (Note: Coles only briefly mentions the matter.) and he did not take part in speculation on the purposes of the stone circles – he restricted himself to recording their details. He was able to secure repeated awards through his diligent work and prompt publication.

== Gunning Fellowship publications ==
- Coles, Frederick (1900) [First published 30-11-1900]. "Report on Stone Circles in Kincardineshire (North), and part of Aberdeenshire, with measured Plans and Drawings, obtained under the Gunning Fellowship". Proceedings of the Society of Antiquaries of Scotland. 34 (1899): 139–198.
- Coles, Frederick (1901) [First published 30-11-1901]. "Report on the Stone Circles of the North-East of Scotland, Inverurie District, obtained under the Gunning Fellowship, with Measured Plans and Drawings". Proceedings of the Society of Antiquaries of Scotland. 35 (1900): 187–248.
- Coles, Frederick (1902) [First published 30-11-1902]. "Report on Stone Circles in Aberdeenshire (Inverurie, Eastern Parishes, and Insch Districts), with measured Plans and Drawings, obtained under the Gunning Fellowship". Proceedings of the Society of Antiquaries of Scotland. 36 (1901): 488–581.
- Coles, Frederick (1903) [First published 30-11-1903]. "Report on the Stone Circles of North-Eastern Scotland, chiefly in Auchterless and Forgue, with measured Plans and Drawings, obtained under the Gunning Fellowship". Proceedings of the Society of Antiquaries of Scotland. 37 (1902): 82–142.
- Coles, Frederick (1904) [First published 30-11-1904]. "Report on Stone Circles of the North-East of Scotland - the Buchan District - with measured Plans and Drawings, obtained under the Gunning Fellowship". Proceedings of the Society of Antiquaries of Scotland. 38 (1903): 256–305.
- Coles, Frederick (1905) [First published 30-11-1905]. "Record of (I) the Excavation of two Stone Circles in Kincardineshire: (1) in Garrol Wood, Durris; (2) in Glassel Wood, Banchory-Ternan; and (II) Report on Stone Circles in Aberdeenshire, with measured Plans and Drawings; obtained under the Gunning Fellowship.and (ii.) Report on stone circles in Aberdeenshire, with measured plans and drawings; obtained under the Gunning Fellowship". Proceedings of the Society of Antiquaries of Scotland. 39 (1904): 190–218.
- Coles, Frederick (1906) [First published 30-11-1906]. "Report on Stone Circles surveyed in the North-East of Scotland, chiefly in Banffshire, with measured Plans and Drawings, obtained under the Gunning Fellowship". Proceedings of the Society of Antiquaries of Scotland. 40 (1905): 164–206.
- Coles, Frederick (1907) [First published 30-11-1907]. "Report on Stone Circles surveyed in the North-East of Scotland (Banffshire and Moray), with measured Plans and Drawings; obtained under the Gunning Fellowship". Proceedings of the Society of Antiquaries of Scotland. 41 (1906): 130–172.
- Coles, Frederick (1908) [First published 30-11-1908]. "Report on Stone Circles surveyed in Perthshire - North Eastern Section; with measured Plans and Drawings (obtained under the Gunning Fellowship)". Proceedings of the Society of Antiquaries of Scotland. 42 (1907): 95–162.
- Coles, Frederick (1909) [First published 30-11-1909]. "Report on Stone Circles surveyed in Perthshire (South-east District), with measured Plans and Drawings; obtained under the Gunning Fellowship". Proceedings of the Society of Antiquaries of Scotland. 43 (1908): 93–130.
- Coles, Frederick (1910) [First published 30-11-1910]. "Report on Stone Circles surveyed in Perthshire (Aberfeldy district), with measured Plans and Drawings (obtained under the Gunning Fellowship)". Proceedings of the Society of Antiquaries of Scotland. 44 (1909): 117–168.
  - Coles (1910) includes an overall summary tabulating sizes of various circles, pages 163–168
- Coles, Frederick (1911) [First published 30-11-1911]. "Report on Stone Circles in Perthshire, principally Strathearn, with measured Plans and Drawings (obtained under the Gunning Fellowship)". Proceedings of the Society of Antiquaries of Scotland. 45 (1910): 46–116.
