= Easter Aquhorthies stone circle =

Well-preserved recumbent stone circle in north-east Scotland

Easter Aquhorthies Stone Circle
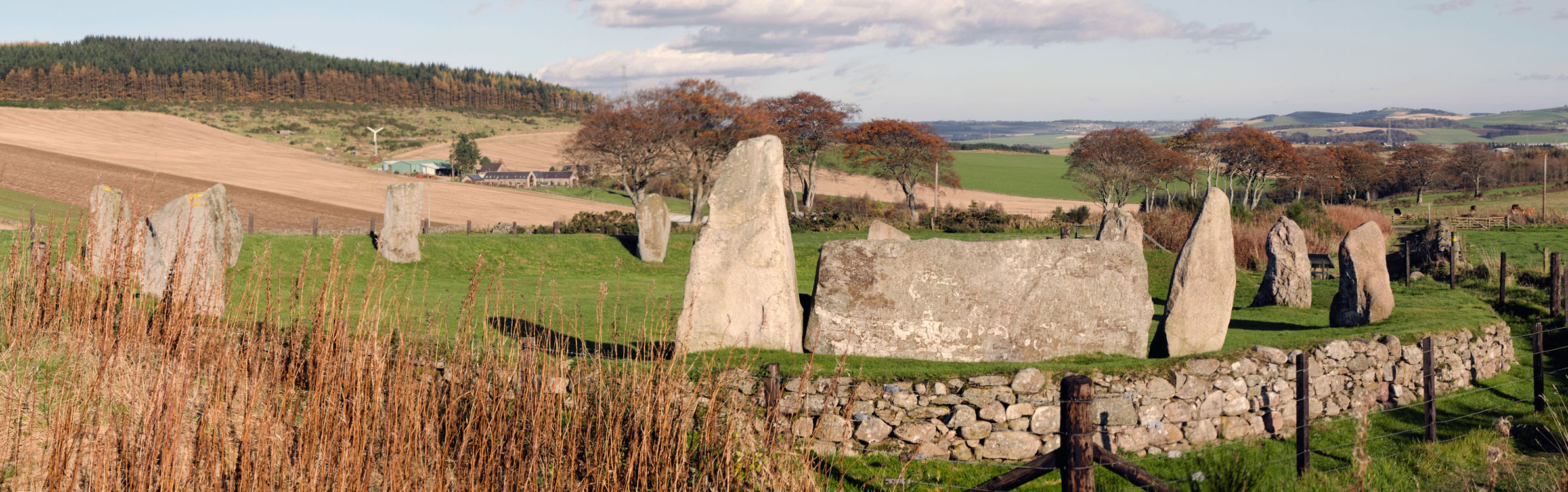
- Stone circle in 2015
- Interactive map of Easter Aquhorthies Stone Circle
- 57°16′37″N 2°26′44″W
- Type: Stone circle
- Periods: Neolithic / Bronze Age
- Location: Aberdeenshire, Scotland grid reference NJ73232079

Site notes
- Owner: Historic Environment Scotland
- Public access: Yes
- Website: Historic Environment Scotland

Scheduled monument
- Official name: East Aquhorthies, Stone Circle
- Type: Prehistoric ritual and funerary: stone circle or ring
- Designated: 31 August 1925
- Reference no.: SM90126

The Easter Aquhorthies stone circle, (Note: Historic Environment Scotland records (which were originally on the Canmore database) call it "Easter Aquhorthies" but gives "East" as an alternative for "Easter" and "Aquhorties" for "Aquhorthies".) located near Inverurie in north-east Scotland, is one of the best-preserved examples of a recumbent stone circle and one of the few that still have their full complement of stones and the only one that has all its stones still standing without having been re-erected. It stands on a gentle hill slope about 1 mile (1.6 km) west of Inverurie and consists of a ring of nine stones, eight of which are grey granite and one red jasper. Two more grey granite stones flank a recumbent of red granite flecked with crystals and lines of quartz. The circle is particularly notable for its builders' use of polychromy in the stones, with the reddish ones situated on the SSW side and the grey ones opposite. The discovery of a possible cist covered by a capstone at the centre of the circle indicates that there may once have been a cairn there, but only a conspicuous bump now remains.

The ring of stones is not quite circular and has a somewhat "squashed" aspect, measuring 18.4 metres (60 ft) along a WNW–ESE axis by 18.1 metres (59 ft). As is the case with other recumbent stone circles in the region, opposing pairs of stones have been erected on each side, increasing in height from a single low stone on the NNE side with the tallest stones, the flankers, opposite on the SSW side. The flankers are each about 2.5 metres (8.2 ft) high, while the recumbent is 3.8 metres (12 ft) long by 1.4 metres (4.6 ft) high. It is aligned so that its level top lines up with the southern moonset in the direction of the nearby Hill of Fare. Two other large stones support the recumbent at right angles, projecting into the circle.

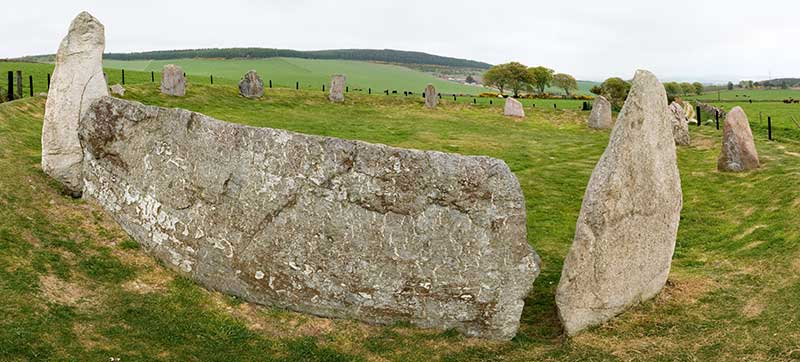
Close-up view of the recumbent and flankers

The placename Aquhorthies derives from a Scottish Gaelic word meaning "field of prayer", and may indicate a "long continuity of sanctity" between the Stone or Bronze Age circle builders and their much later Gaelic successors millennia later. The circle's surroundings were landscaped in the late 19th century, and it sits within a small fenced and walled enclosure. A stone dyke, known as a roundel, was built around the circle some time between 1847 and 1866–7. The circle was subsequently brought to wider public attention in the 1870s and 1880s by a series of paintings, drawings, and descriptions, though some were far-fetched, such as Christian Maclagan's reconstruction of the circle as a kind of broch. In 1884, it attracted the attention of the archaeologist Augustus Pitt Rivers, and five years later his assistants William Tomkin and Claude Gray visited the site to measure, document, and photograph it in order to build a scale model (which is now part of the collection of The Salisbury Museum in Wiltshire).

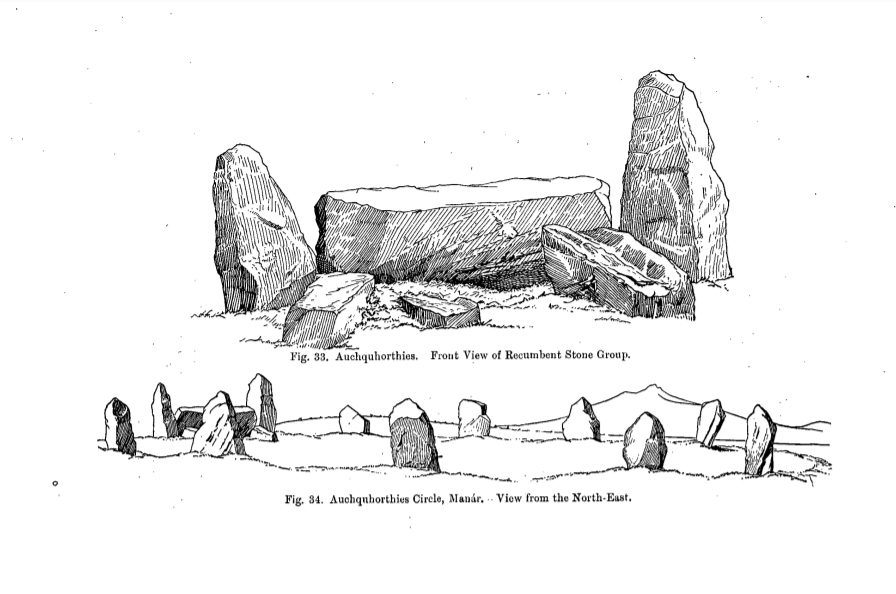
Sketch of stone circle by Fred. Coles in 1900

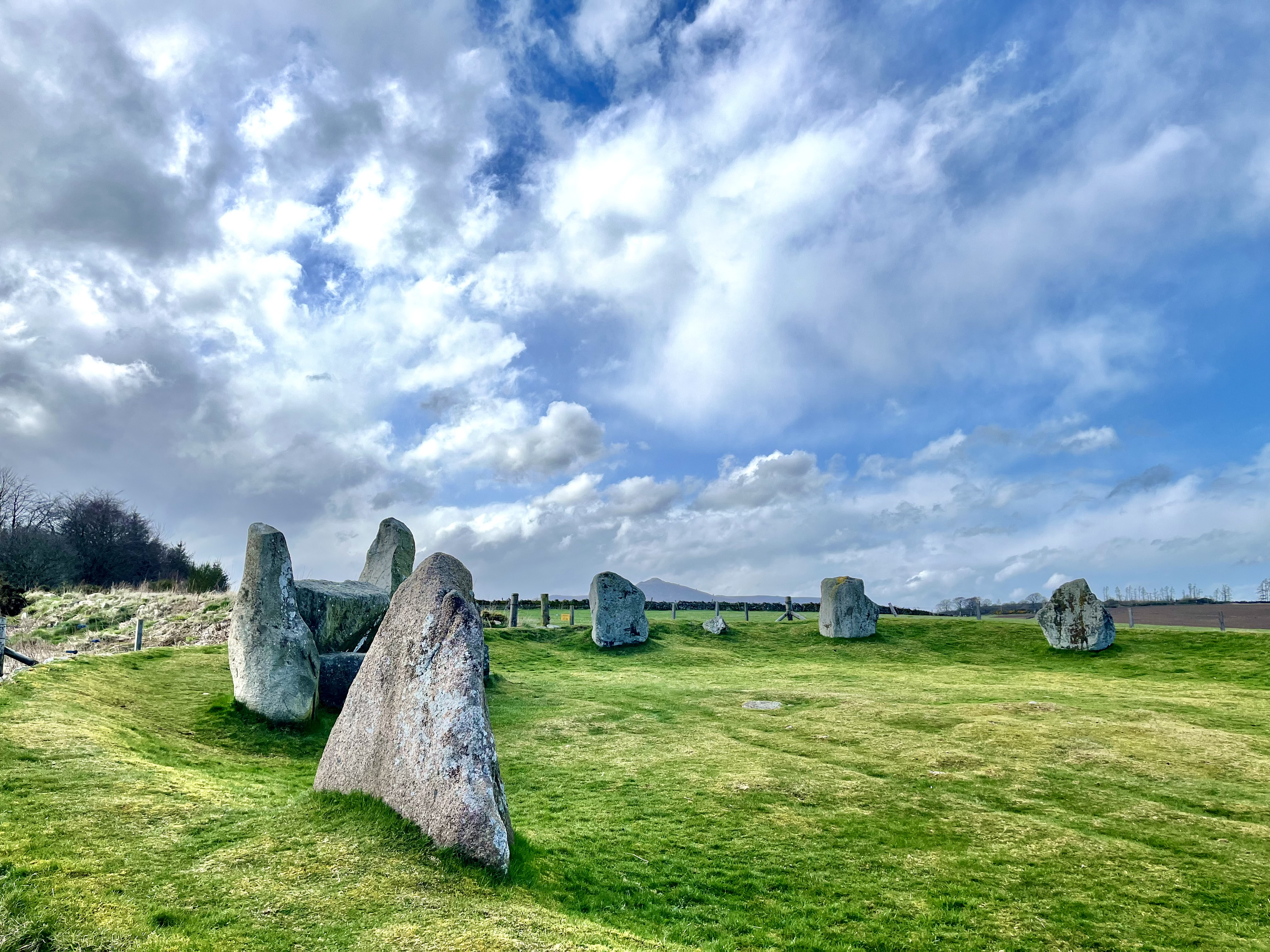
View of part of the circle in 2024

In 1900, Coles found the circle "in an excellent state of preservation", protected from damage by cattle and without shrubbery growing around. He carried out a very careful survey. The circle became badly overgrown in the first quarter of the 20th century; George Browne recorded that when he visited in 1920 it was "filled with a forest of whin bushes as high as our heads". It was scheduled as an ancient monument by the Ministry of Works in 1925, and was taken into guardianship by the State in 1963. The stones were cleaned in 1985 so that casts could be taken of them for an exhibition in Edinburgh, revealing previously undetected subtleties in their colouring. Further investigations also revealed that the ring had noteworthy acoustic properties, though it is unclear whether this was the case before the demolition of the central cairn and the construction of the roundel (which may have re-used the cairn's stones).
