= Clive Ruggles =

British astronomer (born 1952)

Clive L. N. Ruggles (born 8 October 1952) is a British astronomer, archaeologist and academic. He is the author of academic and popular works on the subject.

== Career ==
In 1999, he was appointed professor of archaeoastronomy at the School of Archaeology and Ancient History, University of Leicester, when it is believed to have been the only appointed chair for archaeoastronomy among the world's universities. As of 2023, he was Emeritus Professor at this university.

Ruggles was the president of the Prehistoric Society from 2006 to 2010 and the president of the IAU Commission for the History of Astronomy from 2009 to 2012. He is the Chair for the IAU World Heritage and Astronomy Working Group, and was formerly the President of the International Society for Archaeoastronomy and Astronomy in Culture.
