= Clava cairn =

Type of Bronze Age chamber tomb

Coordinates: 57.47367°N 4.07435°W

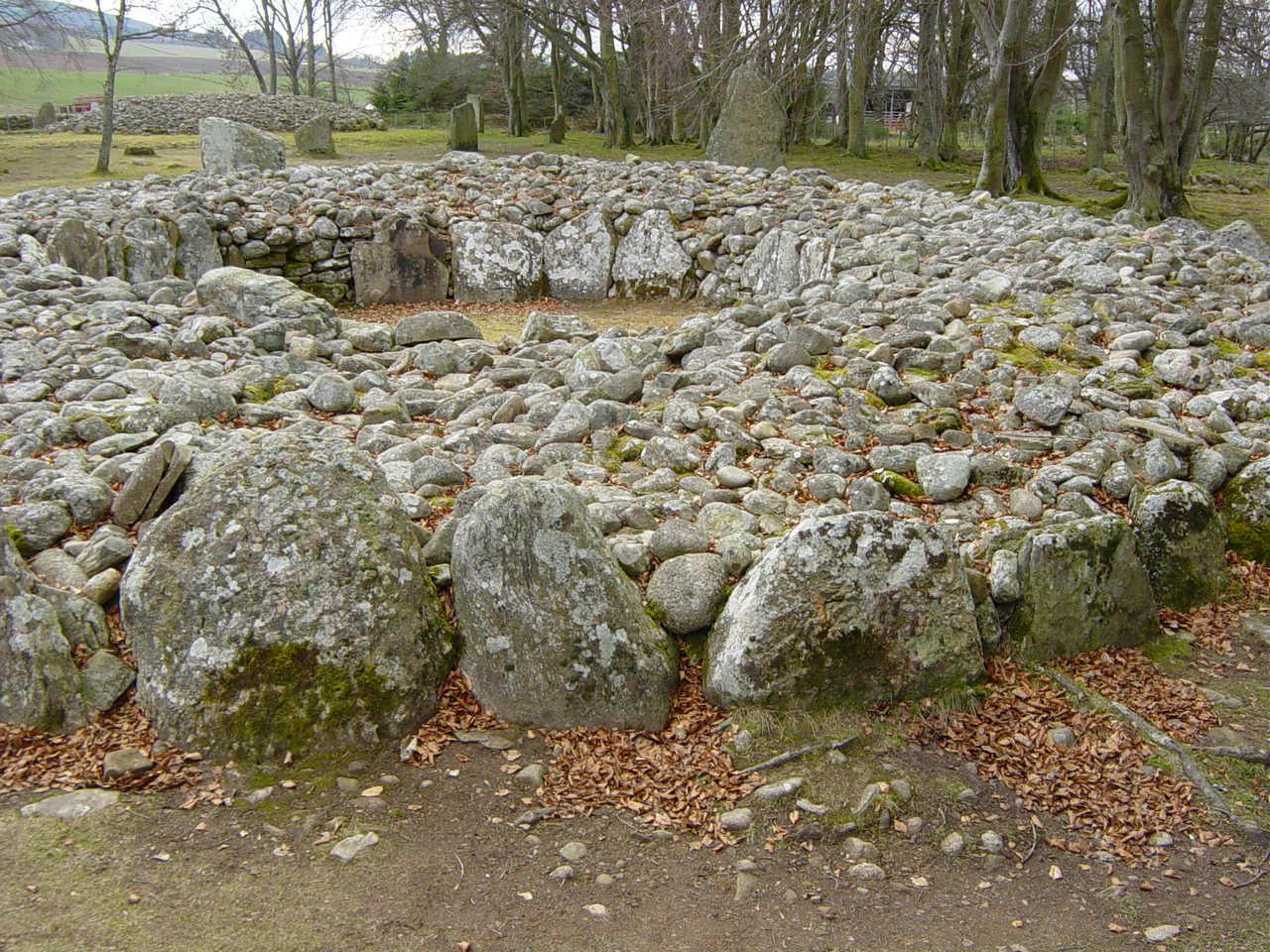
Ring-type cairn at Balnauran of Clava

The Clava cairn is a type of Bronze Age circular chamber tomb cairn, named after the group of three cairns at Balnuaran of Clava, to the east of Inverness in Scotland. There are about 50 cairns of this type in an area round about Inverness.

They fall into two sub-types, one typically consisting of a corbelled passage grave with a single burial chamber linked to the entrance by a short passage and covered with a cairn of stones, with the entrances oriented southwest towards midwinter sunset. In the other sub-type an annular ring cairn encloses an apparently unroofed area with no formal means of access from the outside.

In both sub-types a stone circle surrounds the whole tomb and a kerb often runs around the cairn. The standing stones vary in height so that the tallest are oriented southwest at the entrance and the shortest are directly opposite it.

When Clava-type tombs still contained burial remains, only one or two bodies appear to have been buried in each, and the lack of access to the second sub-type suggests that there was no intention of re-visiting the dead or communally adding future burials as had been the case with Neolithic cairn tombs.

== Balnuaran of Clava ==
At Balnuaran of Clava itself there is a group of three Bronze Age cairns which lie close together in a line running north east to south west. These tombs are the type site for roughly 50 similar cairns found around Inverness and the Moray Firth. The tombs at either end are of the passage grave sub-type. The central cairn is of the ring cairn sub-type, and uniquely has stone paths or causeways forming "rays" radiating out from the platform round the kerbs to three of the standing stones. The cairns incorporate cup and ring mark stones, carved before they were built into the structures. The kerb stones are graded in size and selected for colour, so that the stones are larger and redder to the south west, and smaller and whiter to the north east. All these elements seem to have been constructed as one operation and indicate a complex design rather than ad hoc additions.

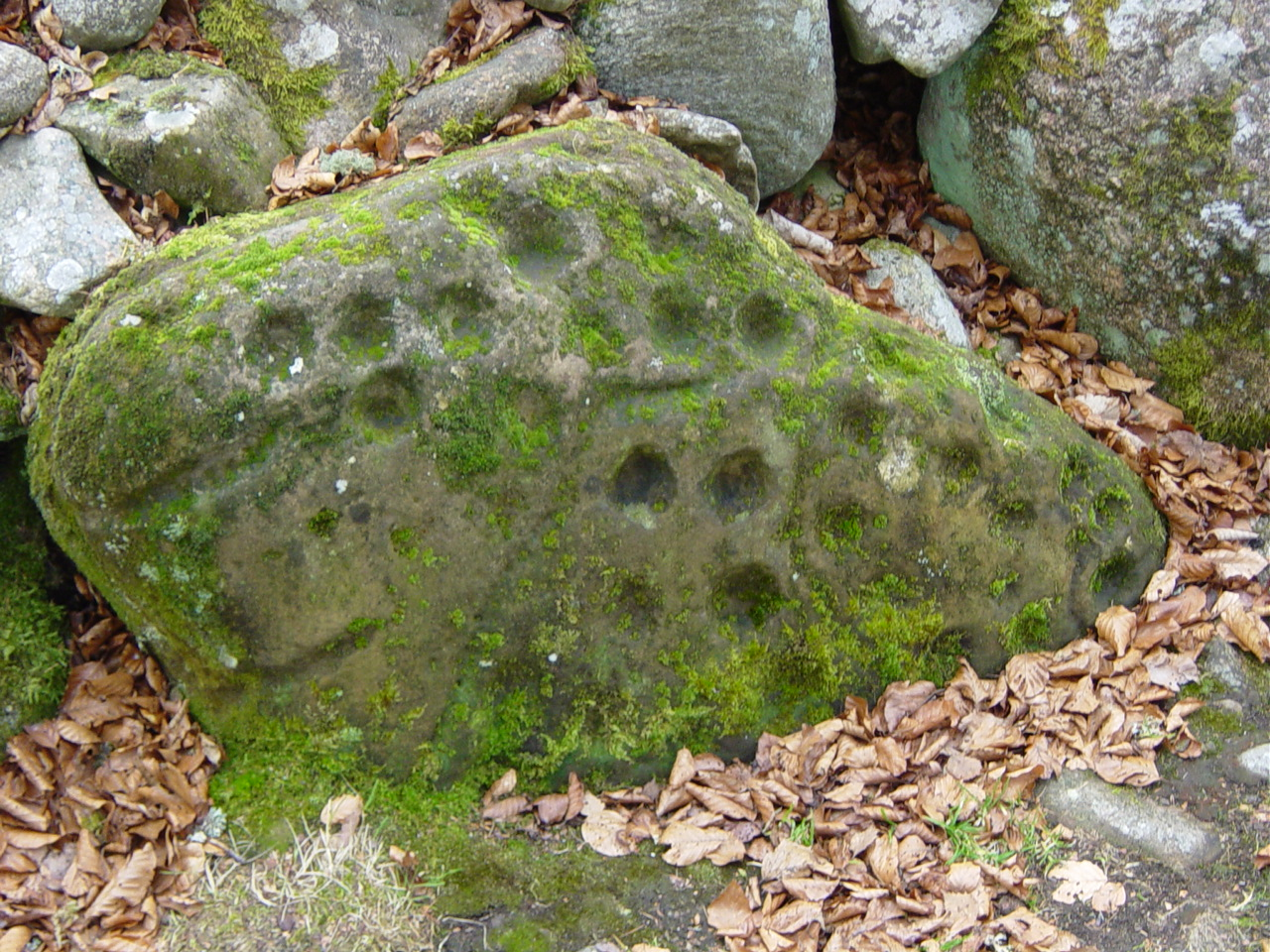
Cup marks on the northern cairn at Balnuaran of Clava

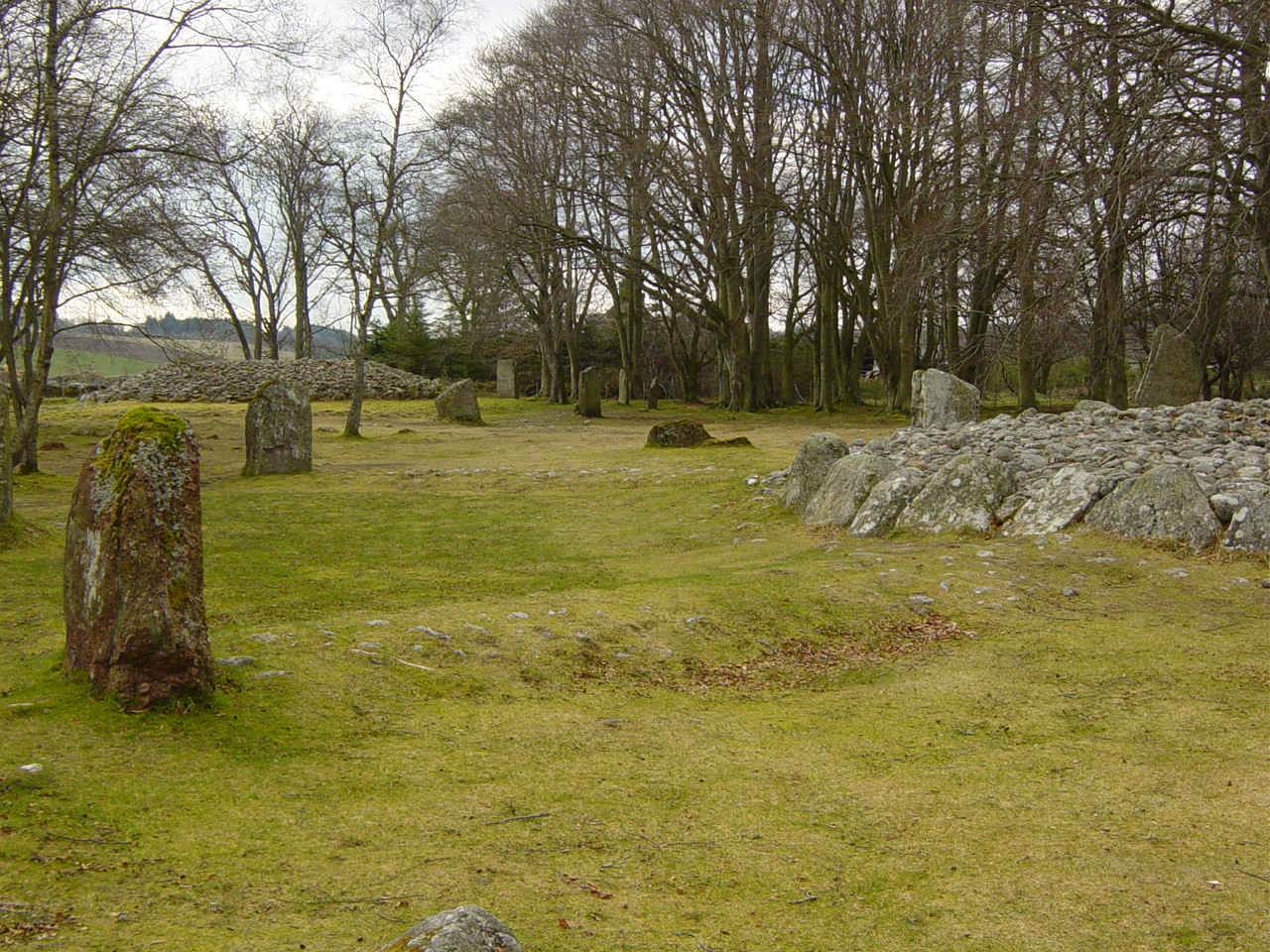
Clava cairns at Balnuaran of Clava

- grid reference NH757445
