= Recumbent stone circle =

Type of archaeological structure

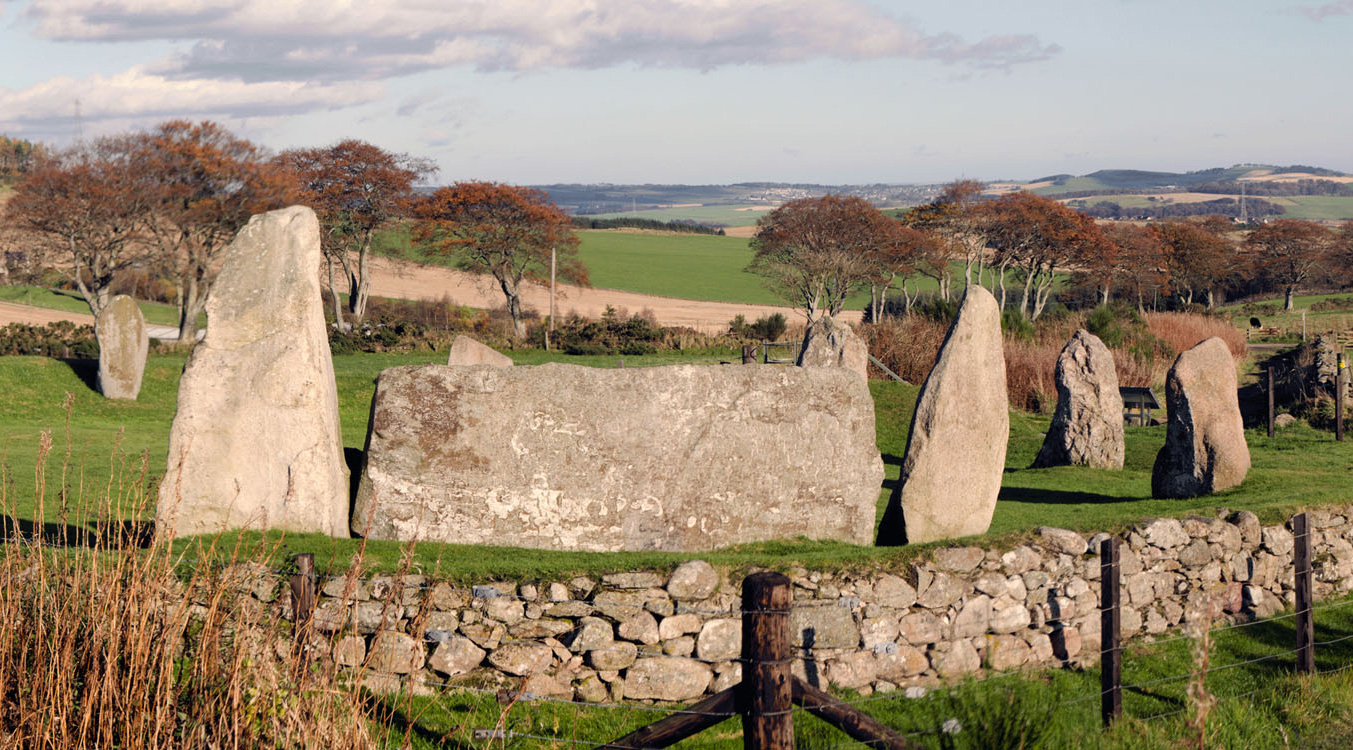
Easter Aquhorthies recumbent stone circle

A recumbent stone circle is a type of stone circle that incorporates a large monolith, known as a recumbent, lying on its side. They are found in only two regions: in Aberdeenshire in the north-east of Scotland and in the far south-west of Ireland in the counties of Cork and Kerry. In Ireland, the circles are now more commonly called Cork–Kerry or axial stone circles. They are believed by some archaeologists such as Aubrey Burl to be associated with rituals in which moonlight played a central role, as they are aligned with the arc of the southern moon. Recent excavations at Tomnaverie stone circle have suggested that no alignment of the circle was intended.

Over 70 recumbent circles have been definitively identified in Aberdeenshire. They are believed to be linked to the Clava cairns in Inverness-shire which were constructed slightly earlier (around 3000 BC). Recumbent stone circles typically enclose a ring cairn and the stones are graded in size so that the smallest faces the recumbent.

== Typology ==
=== Scottish stone circles ===
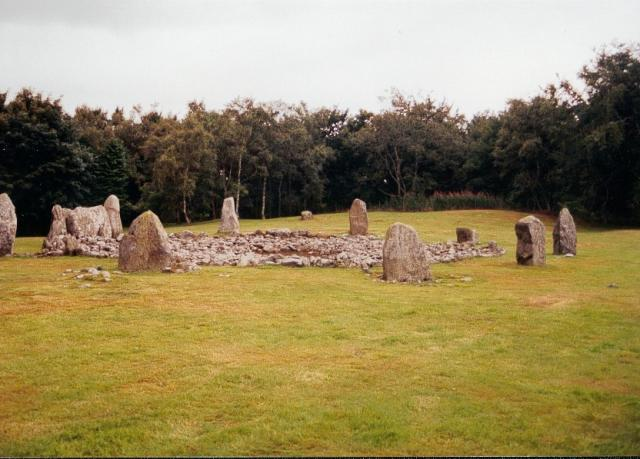
Loanhead of Daviot

Over 70 recumbent circles have been definitively identified in Aberdeenshire in the 2011 book Great Crowns of Stone: The Recumbent Stone Circles of Scotland, published by the Royal Commission on the Ancient and Historical Monuments of Scotland. Aubrey Burl and Clive Ruggles had previously suggested that there were up to 99 recumbent stone circles in an area of Aberdeenshire spanning about 80 km (50 mi) north to south by 50 km (31 mi) east to west. They are clustered in areas characterised by low hills, away from the mountains and alongside patches of fertile and well-drained soil, which would indicate that they were built by local farmers. They were normally constructed on sloping hillsides, aligned towards the southern moon. A few sites were deliberately levelled before construction of the circle; one, at Berrybrae, was built on an artificial clay platform. However recent excavation at Tomnaverie stone circle has suggested that no accurate alignment of the circle was ever intentional.

The diameters of the Scottish circles range from 18.2 m (60 ft) to 24.4 m (80 ft). They are typified by the presence of a massive recumbent stone, averaging 24 tons in weight, lying between the circle's two tallest stones, known as flankers. The recumbents were carefully positioned by the circle builders and generally appear on the southwest side of the circle, with their bases supported (in some cases on mounds) so that their tops are level. The other stones in the circle taper off sequentially so that the smallest are to be found opposite the recumbent. The recumbent and its flankers were evidently seen as the most important elements of the circle; in a number of cases the remaining stones were added later, and in some cases were apparently never added at all.

=== Irish stone circles ===
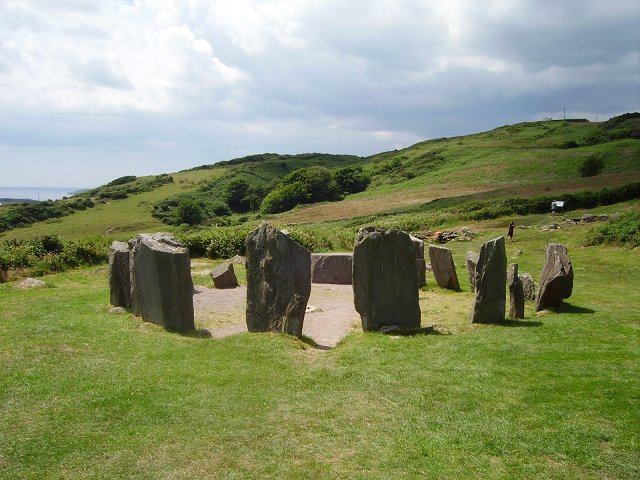
Drombeg stone circle in Ireland, showing the small recumbent stone visible through the gap between the large portal stones opposite

Irish recumbent stone circles take a rather different form, with the recumbent being small and placed in an isolated position on the southwest side while the two tallest stones, known as portals, stand opposite on the northeast side. It is highly likely that the recumbent stone circles of northeast Scotland and south-west Ireland are related, given how similar they are, but the geographical distance between them – several hundred kilometers of mountain terrain, bogs and sea – has prompted debate about how exactly the relationship came about. It is possible that rather than there being direct communication between the two locations, the ideas underlying recumbent stone circles were transmitted by a single influential person or group of people who – for whatever reason – left one location and perhaps settled in the other. Because of the differences in design they are now more commonly called Cork–Kerry or axial stone circles.

== Usage ==
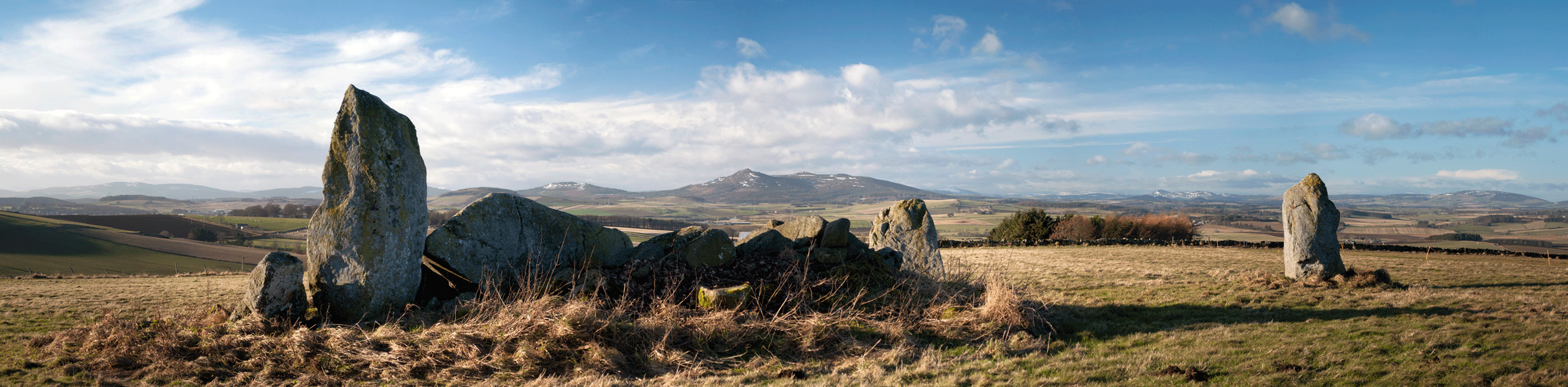
View of the fragmentary Kirkton of Bourtie stone circle, illustrating the wide vistas chosen by the circle-builders

Recumbent stone circles are believed by some archaeologists such as Aubrey Burl to have been designed for ritualistic astronomical purposes. The moon would have appeared above the recumbent stone, framed between the flankers. Scotland's recumbent stone circles have an average diameter of about 20 m (66 ft), so a recumbent stone that was 3.7 m (12 ft) long would have given an observer an arc of vision of around 10 degrees. This would have given the worshippers about an hour during which the moon would pass over the stone.

About every eighteen and a half years, the moon would make a closer approach in which it would appear to be "framed" between the two flanking stones above the recumbent; this was presumably a peak time for ceremonies. The nature of the ceremonies is unknown, but Burl suggests that "the rites enacted in the rings were closely connected with the flourishing and dying of plants, crops, animals and human beings in the short-lived world of four thousand years ago."

The interiors of some excavated recumbent stone circles have been found to contain pits filled with charcoal, sherds of pottery and the cremated remains of human bones (sometimes those of young children). However, they were not funerary monuments in the ordinary sense; the remains appear to have been merely "tokens" representing a few individuals and a small portion of the bodies. It is possible that they may have been used to lend sanctity to the sites. The builders also scattered crushed quartz around the recumbents, which would have refracted and reflected the beams of moonlight. It may have been seen as "moonstone", serving to draw down the influence of the moon into the desired spot and imbue the ceremony with its radiance.

== Development and analysis ==
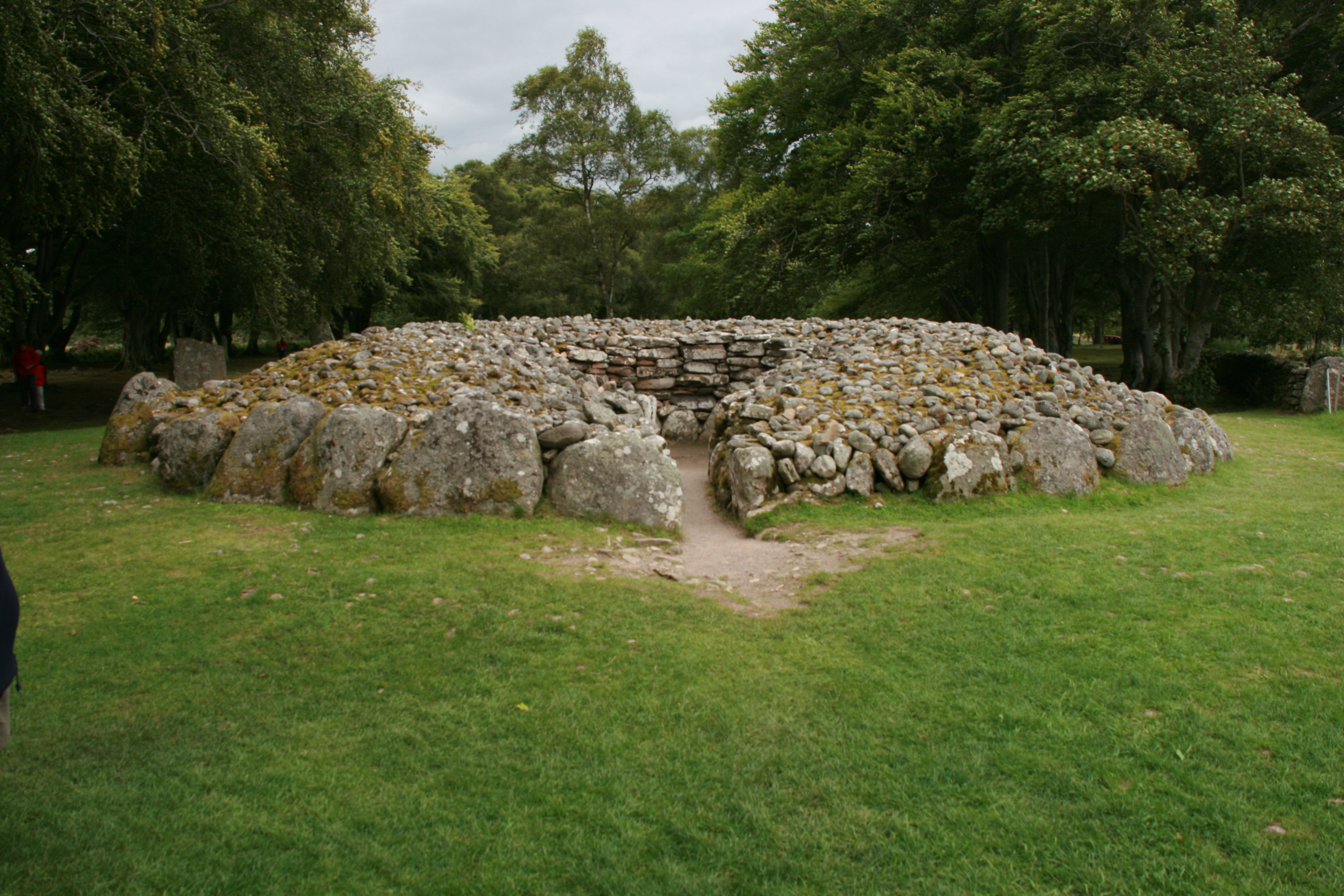
Balnauran of Clava cairn

The recumbent stone circles of Scotland have been linked to an earlier type of monument erected around 3000 BC, the Clava cairns near Inverness. The type example of the monument is the three circular cairns at Balnuaran of Clava, which are surrounded by a ring of standing stones rising in height from the northeast to the southwest. The cairns have burial chambers in the interior, each one reached by a passageway that leads in from the southwest side. An analysis published by Burl in 1981 revealed that the tomb passages all lay within the arc of the moon during its eighteen-and-a-half year cycle. However, they could not have been used for observations as their sightlines were too restricted.

The cairns fell into disuse after about 2500 BC, but the lunar astronomical tradition reflected in their structures appears to have been transferred east to the Neolithic farmers of central Aberdeenshire. The gradation in height of the stone rings at Clava is replicated in the recumbent stone circles which appeared across Aberdeenshire during the late Neolithic and early Bronze Age, from around 2700–2000 BC. Their alignment with the southern moon is more precise than that of the Clava cairns; whereas the cairns encompass the entire arc of the moon, the orientation of most of the recumbent stones focuses on a much shorter arc. The degree of precision is limited, however, and the circles were clearly not observatories nor meant for precise knowledge of the moon's movements.

Most recumbent stone circles seem to have encircled a cairn and typically it was a ring cairn, as distinct from a Clava cairn. In some instances, in particular at Tomnaverie stone circle, the cairn was built before the circle according to an overall design. This discovery places doubt on any intent to produce an accurate alignment for the circle. Usually all superficial trace of the cairns has disappeared over the millennia.

The circles are of fairly modest dimensions and Burl theorised that they could have been constructed by a single family. Transporting the massive recumbents was a different matter; the fifty-ton recumbent at Old Keig was transported from six miles away and may have required over 200 people to drag it to its final resting place. Strichen stone circle provided a unique opportunity to test how the recumbents might have been transported. It was incorrectly restored in the 19th century by Lord Lovat, so between 1979 and 1983 it was fully excavated and correctly restored by a team led by Burl, Ian Hampsher-Monk and Philip Abramson. The restoration required the team to move some of the stones, and it was found that the most efficient non-mechanical means of doing so was to drag the stones along a slippery path of wet straw using logs as a kind of sledge.

Unlike the more grandiose Neolithic and Bronze Age monuments found elsewhere in Scotland, the recumbent stone circles of Aberdeenshire do not appear to have been intended to overshadow or overawe other more modest works. Even considering their geographical clustering, they are also well-spread out. Clive Ruggles and Aubrey Burl suggest that this indicates that they were constructed to serve as local ritual centres for groups of subsistence farmers each inhabiting territories of about 10 sq mi (26 km^{2}), living on an egalitarian basis without powerful leaders and possibly numbering no more than about twenty or thirty people per group.

== Legacy ==
The circle builders left no records, but their works were remarked upon and to some extent mythologised in historic times by the region's later inhabitants. The 16th century Aberdonian historian Hector Boece wrote that:

in the times of King Mainus ... huge stones were assembled in a ring and the biggest of them was stretched out on the south side to serve for an altar ... In proof of the fact to this day there stand these mighty stones gathered together into circles 'the old temples of the gods' they are commonly called – and whoso sees them will assuredly marvel by what mechanical craft or by what bodily strength stones of such bulk have been collected to one spot.

The English antiquarian John Aubrey recorded in the 17th century that people believed of the Easter Aquhorthies recumbent stone circle that "Pagan priests of old dwelt in that place" and that:

the Priests caused earth to be brought from other adjacent places upon peoples backs to Auchinchorthie, for making the Soile thereof deeper, which is given for the reason why this parcell of land (though surrounded by heath and moss on all sides) is better and more fertile than other places thereabout.
