= List of axial five-stone circles =

Type of stone circle found in southwest Ireland

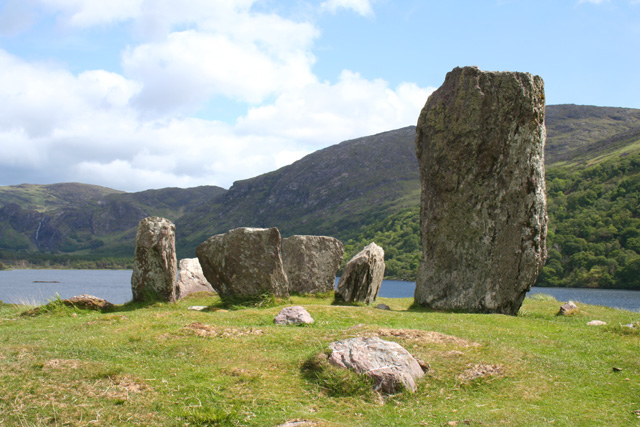
Uragh five-stone circle (the circle is in the centre, the large stone on the right is an associated monolith)

An axial five-stone circle is a particular type of megalithic ring of five stones of which many are found in southwest Ireland. These circles have an approximate axis of symmetry aligned in a generally northeast–southwest direction – the stone at the southwest side of the circle, rather than being an upright orthostat like the rest, rests on the ground with its long axis horizontal. Because it marks the axis it is called the axial stone. It is usually quite thin and it lies with its long thin edge along the circumference of the ring.

There are two types of axial stone circle, one type with five stones, listed here, and axial multiple-stone circles, with seven stones or more, listed at List of axial multiple-stone circles. Dating from the Bronze Age, these circles when constructed had an odd number of stones with two stones (portal stones) placed on either side of where the axis crosses the northeast side of the ring. They are found in County Cork and County Kerry.

Early in the 20th century this type of circle was called a recumbent stone circle by analogy with similar examples in Scotland but when it became clear there were substantial differences the term "Cork–Kerry stone circle" was used for both types until later the term "axial stone circle" became commonly used.

Ó Nualláin (1984) has published a comprehensive catalogue of stone circles in the two counties and Burl followed with two books, Burl (1995) and Burl (2000), covering a much broader area but still including this type of circle. Ireland's National Monuments Service, part of the Department of Culture, Heritage and the Gaeltacht, operates a database of archaeology sites and the list in this article covers the sites classified as "stone circle – five-stone". The NMS definition is:

Stone circle - five-stone

A distinctive form of stone circle found only in counties Cork and Kerry. It comprises a ring of five free-standing stones, symmetrically arranged so that one stone, the axial stone, is set directly opposite two stones, usually the tallest, marking the entrance to the circle. Characteristically, the stones reduce in height to the axial stone, which is set consistently in the south-western part of the circle. These circles are thought to have a ritual function and are dated to the Bronze Age (c. 2400-500 BC).

— Class List Definitions, "Stone circle - five-stone". National Monuments Service: Archaeological Survey of Ireland.

Included are 56 sites in County Cork and three in County Kerry.

== List of axial five-stone circles ==
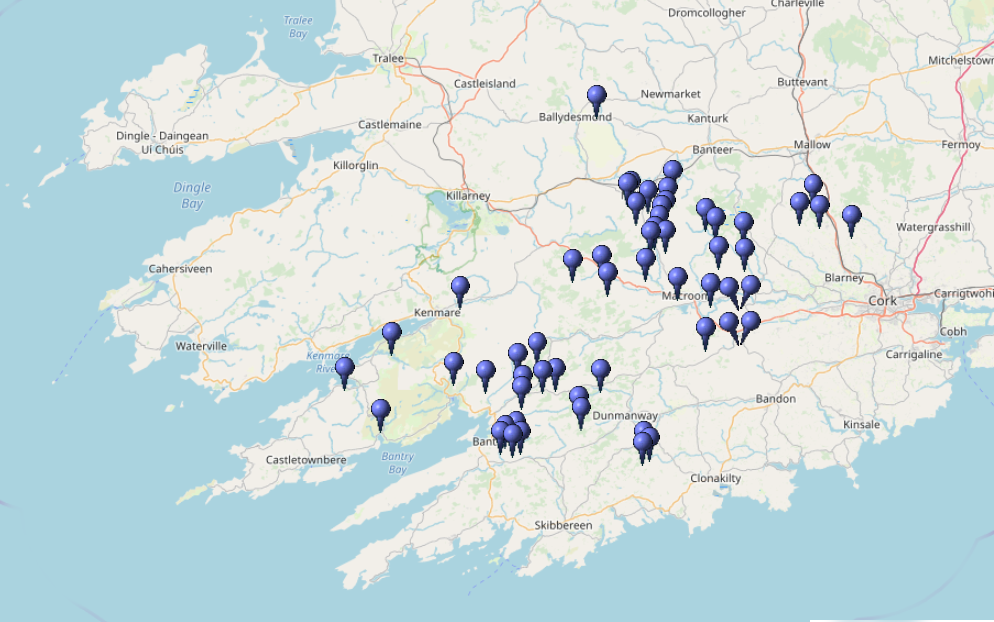
OpenStreetMap display of sites in Cork and Kerry

The map shows the locations of the 56 sites in counties Cork and Kerry. All the locations can be displayed dynamically via the OpenStreetMap viewer.

Townland (Note: The county is indicated in the first two letters of the SMR number. All are in County Cork or County Kerry.)	SMR No. (Note: Sites and Monuments Record number allocated by National Monuments Service.)	Ref. (Note: Top line: number of site in Burl (1995, pp. 212–235) ("none" if not included). Then, number in Burl (2000, pp. 397–401) county listing with C and K for Cork or Kerry. Second line in parentheses: reference number and figure number, both linked to the page numbers in Ó Nualláin (1984).)	Diameter (metre) (Note: Internal length in metres along the axis from Burl (2000) unless otherwise noted. Where two lengths are given (for an oval ring) they are for along and across the axis.)	Num. stones (Note: Number of stones including the axial stone expressed as x/y where x is the number of stones remaining (including fallen ones) and y is the number originally present From Ó Nualláin (1984, pp. 4–5) unless otherwise stated.)	Status (Note: Burl (1995) and Burl (2000) classifies the sites as follows 1 (good) = Good, worth visiting; 2 (OK) = Good but restored; 3 (ruin) = Ruined but recognisable; 4 (gone) = Destroyed or unrecognisable; 5 (unc.) = Uncertain.) Notes	Lat/long (Note: Latitude/ longitude calculated from NMS Irish grid coordinates using Irish Grid Reference Finder.)	Irish Grid (Note: Irish Grid reference conversion from NMS Irish grid coordinates using Irish Grid Reference Finder.)		
An Lománach Mhór; Lumnagh More	CO069-076----	-	2.1	5/5		51.924°N 9.247°W	W142753		
Ballyvouskill	CO048-056----	none C5	3.5	5/5	ruin	52.012°N 9.087°W	W254849		
Baurgorm (N)	CO118-044002-	303A C6a (85 16)	2.6	5/5	ruin	51.667°N 9.413°W	W023469		
Baurgorm (S)	CO118-042----	303B C6b (86 15)	2.6x2.5	5/5	ruin	51.658°N 9.424°W	W015459		
Bellmount Upper (N)	CO083-118----	none C7a (73 15)	4	5/5	gone	51.828°N 8.828°W	W429642		
Bellmount Upper (S)	CO083-117----	none C7b (74 15)	3.9	5/5	gone	51.827°N 8.831°W	W427641		
Cabragh	CO059-015002-	none C11 (63 18)	3.2	4/5	ruin	51.967°N 9.051°W	W278798		
Canrooska	CO090-006002-	none C12 (76 20)	2.4	4/5	ruin	51.766°N 9.543°W	V935582		
Cappaboy Beg (NW)	CO092-004----	306 C13a (77 15)	2.3x1.8	5/5	ruin	51.796°N 9.333°W	W081612		
Carrigagrenane (NE)	CO121-054----	308 C15a (91 18)		4/5	ruin	51.641°N 9.071°W	W259436		
Carrigagulla (NE)	CO049-007----	309 C16a (56 15)	3	2+/5	ruin	52.003°N 8.915°W	W372838		
Carriganimmy	CO048-097001-	311 C17 (55 16)	3.3	5/5	good	51.992°N 9.03°W	W292826		
Carriganine	CO070-092----	none C18 (69 18)		5/5	unc.	51.896°N 8.981°W	W325719		
Carrigonirtane	CO059-011----	none C20	2.8	4/5	ruin	51.974°N 9.04°W	W285806		
Cashelkeelty (E)	KE108-013004-	344 K1b (93 17)	1.5	3/5	ruin	51.757°N 9.814°W	V748575		
Clodagh	CO120-001002-	312 C21 (88 18)	2.7	5/5	good	51.696°N 9.225°W	W153499		
Cloghboola Beg	CO048-080002-	313 C22 (53 19)	3.9x2.8	5/5	ruin	52.015°N 9.012°W	W305852		
Cloghboola More	CO048-025001-	none C23 (52 15)	3.1	4/5	ruin	52.03°N 9.056°W	W275869		
Cousane	CO092-051----	314 C27 (79 15)	3.2x2.4	5/5	good	51.756°N 9.287°W	W112567		
Cullenagh	CO107-024----	none C28		2/5	ruin	51.714°N 9.23°W	W150519		
Cullomane East	CO118-073001-	315 C29 (84 15)	3.9x3.4	5/5	good	51.653°N 9.393°W	W036453		
Derryarkane	CO106-019----	none C34	3	5/5	good	51.728°N 9.373°W	W051536		
Dromatouk	KE093-087----	345 K4 (92 15)	2.7	5/5	good	51.883°N 9.526°W	V949711		
Dromgarriff South	CO051-153----	none C37 (60 23)	3	0/5	gone	51.991°N 8.549°W	W623822		
Dromgarvan	CO116-006----	none C38 (83 15)	3x2.4	5/5	ruin	51.692°N 9.725°W	V808501		
Glanbrack	CO121-059001-	none C42 (90 16)	2.8	3/5	ruin	51.648°N 9.053°W	W271444		
Glenleigh	CO039-097----	none C45 (50 15)	3.4	4/5	ruin	52.061°N 8.995°W	W318903		
Glenreagh	CO021-060----	none C46 (49 16)	3.5	4/5	ruin	52.176°N 9.186°W	R189033		
Gort Na Tiobratan; Gortnatubbrid	CO058-029----	none C51 (61 15)	2.4	4/5	ruin	51.93°N 9.173°W	W193758		
Grenagh South	CO051-103----	none C54 (59 23)	5	0/5	gone	52.007°N 8.629°W	W568840		
Illane	CO092-016001-	none C55 (78 20)	2.7x2.3	5/5	ruin	51.78°N 9.383°W	W045595		
Inchireagh	CO107-012----	none C56 (82 17)	3x2.4	5/5	ruin	51.754°N 9.174°W	W189563		
Inchybegga	CO119-032----	none C57 (87 17)	3x2.7	4/5	ruin	51.659°N 9.376°W	W048460		
Kealkill	CO106-006001-	323 C59 (81 20)	2.8x2.5	5/5	good	51.745°N 9.371°W	W053555		
Kilmeedy West (E)	CO039-242----	-	1.6	4/5		52.044°N 9.1°W	W245885		
Kilmeedy West (W)	CO047-005----	none C62	3.5	3/5	ruin	52.041°N 9.11°W	W238881		
Knockantota North	CO051-018----	none C63		0/5	gone	52.039°N 8.645°W	W558875		
Knockavullig (N)	CO071-106----	none C65a (71 17)	2.4x2.3	0/5	gone	51.884°N 8.829°W	W429704		
Knockavullig (S)	CO071-068----	none C65b (72 17)	3.2	5/5	ruin	51.882°N 8.831°W	W428702		
Knocknakilla	CO048-095002-	324 C66 (54 19)	2.7	5/5	good	52.006°N 9.024°W	W297842		
Knocknaneirk (NE)	CO083-085002-	none C67a (75 16)	3.9x3.1	5/5	good	51.818°N 8.914°W	W370631		
Knockraheen	CO059-023002-	325 C68 (62 18)	4.1x3.6	5/5	good	51.969°N 9.013°W	W304801		
Laharankeal	CO060-137----	none C37 (64 17)	1.5	5/5	ruin	51.944°N 8.881°W	W394772		
Leckaneen	CO061-084----	none C72 (66 17)	3.5	5/5	ruin	51.941°N 8.815°W	W440768		
Lettergorman (SW)	CO121-035----	326 C73b (89 17)	3.1x2.8	5/5	ruin	51.658°N 9.067°W	W262455		
Lissacresig	CO070-016----	328 C74 (r 17)	3.6x3	5/5	good	51.925°N 9.062°W	W270752		
Maughanaclea centre	CO106-014001-	none C76a	2.6x2.2	5/5	ruin	51.752°N 9.32°W	W089562	2.9x2.7	W 390 821}}
Pluckanes North	CO051-043001-	none C80 ([https://www.js							
Mill Little	CO105-004004-	332 C78 (80 18)	3.1x2.4	5/5	ruin	51.753°N 9.464°W	V989566		
Oughtihery (NW)	CO049-029----	333 C79b (57 17)tor.org/stable/25506112?seq=33 58] 22)	3.7x3.2	0/5	gone	52.012°N 8.677°W	W535845		
Ré Na Ndoirí; Reananerre	CO069-026----	336 C81 (67 17)	2.6x1.9	5/5	good	51.903°N 9.158°W	W203729		
Rosnascalp	CO071-100----	none C83 (70 17)	3	5/5	ruin	51.886°N 8.899°W	W381707		
Rylane	CO061-001----	337 C84 (65 16)	3.7x2.9	5/5	good	51.982°N 8.817°W	W438813		
Trawlebane	CO119-005----	none C87	2.4	5/5	ruin	51.674°N 9.386°W	W042477		
Tullig	CO048-044----	none C88 (51 none)		0/5	gone	52.036°N 9.007°W	W309876		
Uragh (NE)	KE101-012001-	none K19a	2.5x2.4	5/5		51.811°N 9.696°W	V831634		

== See also ==
List of recumbent stone circles
