= List of axial multiple-stone circles =

Type of stone circle found in southwest Ireland

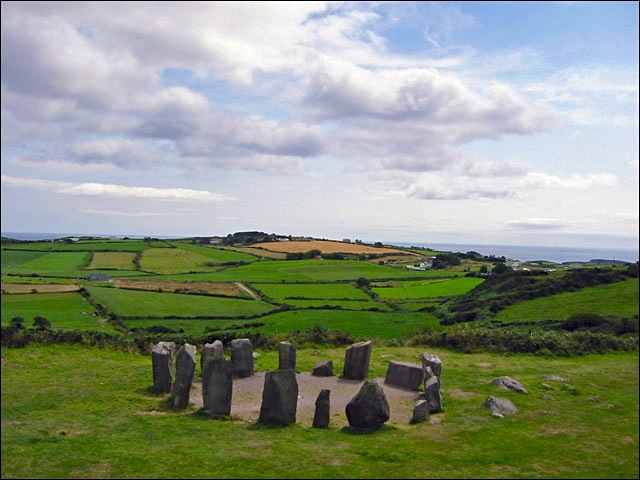
Drombeg multiple-stone circle

An axial stone circle is a particular type of megalithic ring of stones of which many are found in southwest Ireland. Archaeologists have found it convenient to consider axial five-stone circles and axial multiple-stone circles separately – this list is of multiple-stone circles, those with seven stones or more. They have an approximate axis of symmetry aligned in a generally northeast–southwest direction – the stone at the southwest side of the circle, rather than being an upright orthostat like all the rest, rests on the ground with its long axis horizontal. Because it marks the axis it is called the axial stone. It is usually quite thin and it lies with its long thin edge along the circumference of the ring.

Dating from the Bronze Age, axial stone circles when constructed had an odd number of stones with two stones (portal stones) placed on either side of where the axis crosses the northeast side of the ring. They are found in County Cork and County Kerry.

Early in the 20th century they were called recumbent stone circles by analogy with similar examples in Scotland but when it became clear there were substantial differences the term "Cork–Kerry stone circle" was adopted. The term "axial stone circle" has since become frequently used leaving it unclear whether both types or only the multiple type is meant.

Ó Nualláin (1984) has published a comprehensive catalogue of stone circles in the two counties and Burl followed with two books, Burl (1995) and Burl (2000), covering a much broader area but still including this type of circle. Ireland's National Monuments Service, part of the Department of Culture, Heritage and the Gaeltacht, operates a database of archaeology sites and the list in this article covers the sites classified as "stone circle – multiple-stone". The NMS definition is:

Stone circle - multiple-stone

A distinctive form of stone circle found only in counties Cork and Kerry. It comprises a ring of free-standing stones, uneven in number (between 7 and 19) and symmetrically arranged so that one stone, the axial stone, is set directly opposite two stones, usually the tallest, marking the entrance to the circle. Characteristically, the stones reduce in height to the axial stone, which is set consistently in the south-western part of the circle. The diameters of these circles rarely exceed 10m. These circles form part of the funerary/ritual tradition of the Bronze Age (c. 2400-500 BC).

— National Monuments Service, Class List Definitions, "Stone circle - multiple-stone". National Monuments Service: Archaeological Survey of Ireland.

Included are 41 sites in County Cork, 15 in County Kerry and a single one in County Clare.

== List of axial multiple-stone circles ==
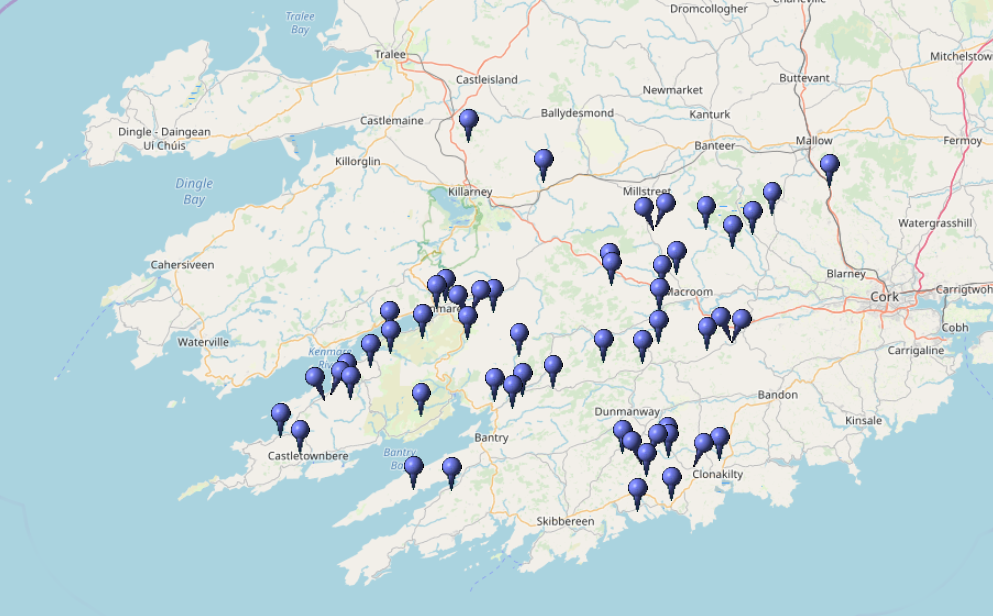
OpenStreetMap display of sites in Cork and Kerry

The map shows the locations of the 56 sites in counties Cork and Kerry (an additional site in County Clare is off the map). All the locations can be displayed dynamically via the OpenStreetMap viewer.

Townland (Note: The county is indicated in the first two letters of the SMR number. All are in County Cork or County Kerry except one in County Clare.)	SMR No. (Note: Sites and Monuments Record number allocated by National Monuments Service.)	Ref. (Note: Number of site in Burl (1995). Also given is the Ó Nualláin (1984) reference number and figure number in parentheses linked to the page numbers in the article.)	Diameter (metre) (Note: From Burl (2000) unless otherwise noted.)	Num. stones (Note: Original number of stones including the axial stone but excluding any central stone as given by Ó Nualláin (1984, pp. 4–5) unless otherwise stated. * = deduced or estimated. When expressed as x/y, x is the number of stones remaining (including fallen ones) and Y is number originally present.)	Status (Note: Burl (1995) and Burl (2000) classifies the sites as follows 1 (good) = Good, worth visiting; 2 (OK) = Good but restored; 3 (ruin) = Ruined but recognisable; 4 (gone) = Destroyed or unrecognisable; 5 (unc.) = Uncertain.) Notes	Lat/long (Note: Latitude/ longitude calculated from NMS Irish grid coordinates using Irish Grid Reference Finder.)	Irish Grid (Note: Irish Grid reference conversion from NMS Irish grid coordinates using Irish Grid Reference Finder.)
Ahagilla	CO121-100----		7	3/?	ruin	51.641°N 8.963°W	W334436
An Dromaid (Dromod)	KE089-053----	(39 8)	4	5/7* (Note: Axial stone missing.)	ruin	51.857°N 10.115°W	V544693
Ardgroom SW	CO102-006001-	302 (21 9)	7.3	10/11	good	51.736°N 9.87°W	V709553
Ardgroom NE	CO102-010----	302 (20 8)		3/5+	gone	51.746°N 9.856°W	V719565
Ballyvackey	CO135-005001-	(35 3)	8.5	7/9*	ruin	51.633°N 8.948°W	W344427
Bohonagh	CO143-032001-	304 (36 1)	9.9	13	good excav.	51.581°N 9°W	W308369
Breeny More	CO106-005001-	305 (24 6	14	5+	gone	51.742°N 9.375°W	W510553
Cappanaboul	CO105-029001-	(22 5)	10.5	10/13*	ruin	51.724°N 9.398°W	W340533
Carrigagrenane (SW)	CO134-008----	308 (33 3)	8.5	13/19	ruin	51.637°N 9.078°W	W254432
Carrigagulla (SW)	CO049-008----	310 (4 4)	9	15/17*	ruin	52°N 8.916°W	W371835
Carrigaphooca	CO070-035----	(11 4)	5.5	5+	ruin (Note: NMS says three stones survive and Burl says "destroyed or unrecognisable".)	51.909°N 9.028°W	W293735
Cashelkeelty (W)	KE108-013001-	344 (47 -)	17	3/11 or 13	gone excav.	51.757°N 9.815°W	V747576
Coolaclevane	CO082-066----	(13 3)	7.5	9	ruin	51.824°N 9.035°W	W287640
Coollick	KE058-134----			10/?	good	52.133°N 9.509°W	V967989
Coolmountain	CO093-013----	(17 8)	9.2	2/11*	gone	51.794°N 9.172°W	W192608
Coulagh	CO114-002----	(25 2)	8.5	5+	gone	51.679°N 9.979°W	V632492
Currabeha (S)	CO083-109002-	(14 2)	7	5/9 or 11	ruin	51.828°N 8.856°W	W411643
Currabeha (N)	CO083-110----	(15 4)	8.5	13*	gone	51.826°N 8.854°W	W412640
Curraghodea	CL031-052----					52.866°N 9.295°W	R128802
Derreenataggart West	CO115-011002-	316 (26 2)	7.7	15*	ruin	51.654°N 9.929°W	V665463
Derrynafinchin	CO092-001001-	(16 5)	8	11 or 13	ruin	51.804°N 9.382°W	W480622
Doughill	KE093-042----	(42 13)	9	0/17*	gone	51.87°N 9.507°W	V963697
Dromagorteen	KE102-032002-		10	13	ruin	51.831°N 9.512°W	V959653
Drombeg	CO143-051002-	(37 1)	9.3	14/17	good excav.	51.564°N 9.087°W	W247352
Drombohilly Upper	KE109-003001-	346 (48 2)	8.5	9/11*	ruin	51.787°N 9.754°W	V790608
Dromkeal	CO105-003----		9	13	ruin	51.734°N 9.444°W	W300545
Dromroe	KE101-010001-	347 (45 7)	9.5	13/13	ruin	51.833°N 9.624°W	V881657
Dunbeacon	CO130-030----	318 (32 1)	8	11	ruin	51.595°N 9.549°W	V927392
Garryglass	CO120-062----	(27 -)		1/11	gone	51.654°N 9.124°W	W223452
Glantane East (SW)	CO048-090----	319 (3 1)	5	11	ruin	51.998°N 9.048°W	W281834
Glantane East (NE)	CO048-093----	(2 9)	5	6/11 or 13*	gone	52.004°N 9.045°W	W283841
Gort An Acra	CO069-015----	(9 1)	8	13	ruin	51.927°N 9.157°W	W205756
Gort An Imill	CO069-013----	320 (10 4)	7.8	9	good	51.914°N 9.151°W	W209741
Gorteanish (Ahakista)	CO130-016----		8	11/11	restored	51.598°N 9.645°W	V861397
Gortroe	CO094-046----	322 (18 9)	8.5	11*	unc.	51.793°N 9.076°W	W258605
Gowlane North	CO050-008----	(5 3)	6.5	8/9*	ruin	52.021°N 8.752°W	W484856
Gurteen	KE094-021001-	348 (43 7)	10.5	11/11	good	51.872°N 9.445°W	W500698
Kealagowlane	CO104-027001-		8	11/11	ruin	51.712°N 9.627°W	V876523
Kenmare	KE093-032001-	349 (41 7)	17x15	15/15	good	51.878°N 9.588°W	V907707
Kilboultragh	CO059-151----	(7 8)	9	0/11	gone	51.93°N 8.989°W	W320757
Killowen	KE093-018----	(40 12)	10	0/11	gone	51.887°N 9.567°W	V922716
Kilmartin Lower	CO050-061001-	(6 9)	3.4	6/7	ruin	51.991°N 8.8°W	W451824
Knocknaneirk	CO095-016----	(19 1)	9.5	7/9*	good	51.813°N 8.913°W	W371626
Knocks (NW)	CO121-063----	(28 3)	9	11*	ruin	51.659°N 9.013°W	W299456
Knocks (SE)	CO121-067----	(29 8)	8.5	5+	gone	51.647°N 9.009°W	W302443
Lackaroe	KE093-050001-		8	8/13	ruin	51.862°N 9.513°W	V958688
Lissard	CO042-074001-	(1 -)	8	0/5+	gone	52.064°N 8.609°W	W583903
Lohart	KE101-007001-	351 (44 -)	11	5+	restored	51.837°N 9.707°W	V824663
Maughanaclea (NE)	CO106-016001-	329 (23 5)	11.5	12/13*	ruin	51.754°N 9.297°W	W105565
Maulatanvally	CO121-057----	331 (30 4)	9.5	7/11*	ruin	51.646°N 9.065°W	W263442
Oughtihery (SE)	CO060-042----	334 (8 8)	2.9	5/7*	ruin	51.97°N 8.851°W	W415801
Readrinagh	KE068-085----		10.7	0/29	gone	52.071°N 9.322°W	W940918
Reanascreena South	CO134-032----	335 (34 11)	9.8x9.3	13/13	good excav.	51.618°N 9.063°W	W264411
Shronebirrane	KE108-022----	353 (46 2)	7.5	9/13*	ruin	51.737°N 9.804°W	V754554
Teergay	CO070-108----	338 (12 3)	7.5	8/9*	ruin	51.873°N 9.03°W	W291694
Templebryan North	CO122-076----	339 (31 4)	9.5	5/9*	ruin	51.643°N 8.883°W	W389437
Uragh (SW)	KE101-025001-		9.5x7.5	10/11	ruin	51.808°N 9.704°W	V825630

== See also ==
List of recumbent stone circles
