= Kealkill stone circle =

Axial five-stone stone circle in County Cork, Ireland

Coordinates: 51°44′42″N 9°22′16″W

- Interactive map of Kealkill stone circle
- Type: Stone circles
- Location: Kealkill, County Cork, Ireland

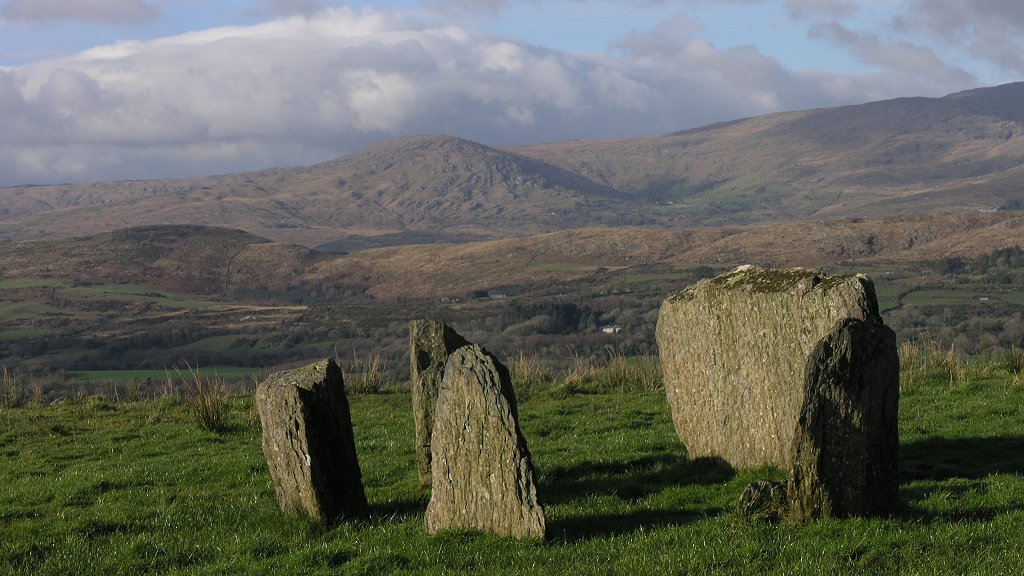
Keallkill five-stone circle (axial stone on left)

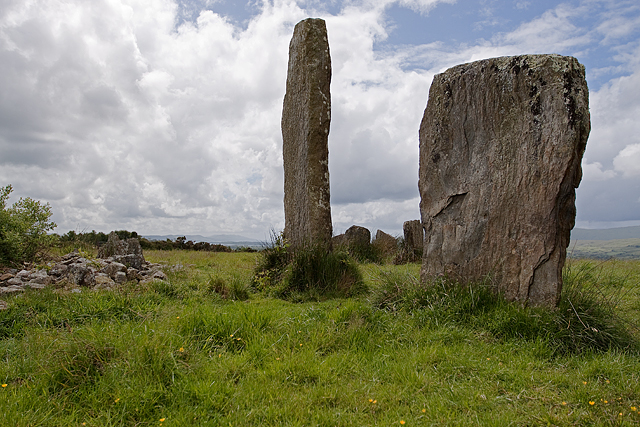
Associated standing stones

Kealkill stone circle is a Bronze Age axial five-stone circle located just outside the village of Kealkill, County Cork in southwest Ireland. When it was excavated in 1938 it was thought the crucial axial stone indicated an alignment to the north, contrary to the general alignment of such stone circles to the southwest. However, later archaeologists have thought it is the comparatively insignificant stone to the southwest that is the axial stone. There are two associated standing stones nearby, one of which had fallen and was re-erected in 1938.

== Type of stone circle ==
Kealkill is an example of the type of stone circle commonly found in counties Cork and Kerry. In 1909 they were first called recumbent stone circles because of their similarity to the recumbent stone circles of Aberdeenshire in Scotland which were also constructed to have a stone lying lengthways rather than upright. In 1975 the archaeologist Seán Ó Nualláin thought the differences from the Scottish rings were sufficiently great to call the Irish rings "Cork–Kerry stone circles" and the crucial stone became the "axial stone" rather than the recumbent stone – from the centre of the circle this stone marks the direction of an axis pointing southwest. Ó Nualláin identified two types of Cork–Kerry circle and Kealkill is in the five-stone category. (Note: The National Monuments Service's database Historical Environment Viewer can be used to look up under "County Cork", "stone circle – five-stone" to provide their record, number CO106-006001-, for this monument.)

== Location and design ==
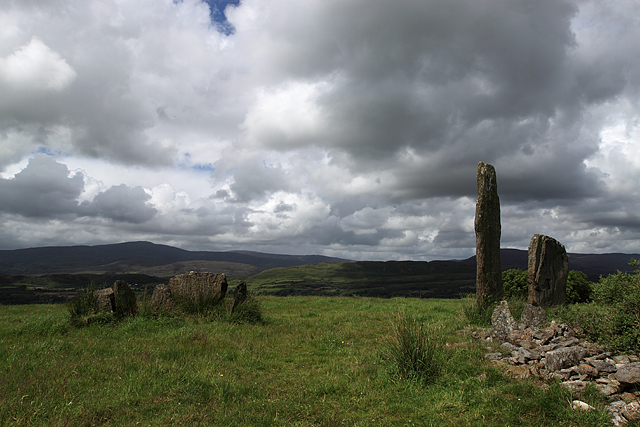
Circle on left with two associated standing stones on right

Sketch of the layout of the circle

This well-known stone circle is set on the slopes of Maughanclea Hill at 120–150 metres (400–500 ft) overlooking Bantry Bay on ground that would have been suitable for cultivation. Breeny More stone circle can be seen in the distance to the southwest. The stones are positioned in a somewhat elliptical shape, about 2.8 by 2.4 metres (9 ft 2 in × 7 ft 10 in), and there are two tall upright standing stones and a ring cairn nearby. Excavation in 1938 led to the idea that the large stone on the north side of the circle was the axial stone but in 1984 Ó Nualláin considered that the small slab 0.76 metres (2 ft 6 in) high at the southwest was really the axial stone. The portal stones, the two on the opposite side from the axial, are both about 1.2 metres (3 ft 11 in) high but they are very different in width – 1.2 metres (3 ft 11 in) and 0.5 metres (1 ft 8 in).

Five metres (16 ft) to the northeast the two tall standing stones, menhirs, are 1.6 metres (5 ft 3 in) apart. The lower, broader one is 2.3 metres (7 ft 7 in) tall and the taller was originally 5.3 metres (17 ft). However, by the time of excavation this stone had fallen, presumably blown down in a gale, leaving a 5-metre (16 ft) broken piece and a stump protruding 0.30 metres (12 in) out of the ground. The excavators set the broken piece vertical again, discarding the stump, so it is now 4.3 metres (14 ft) tall. Two metres (6 ft 7 in) southeast of the standing stones is the cairn with four kerb stones.

== Archaeology ==
In 1938 two shallow ditches were discovered in the acid peat crossing near the centre of the ring and it was supposed these once held wooden beams that in turn supported a vertical post. If this is correct it would be a unique feature for such a stone circle. Excavation of the cairn showed that there had originally been 18 radially-orientated kerb stones in a ring that was somewhat smaller than the 7.6-metre (25 ft) diameter of the cairn. Nothing was found helpful for dating purposes (Note: This sort of stone circle is thought to date from the Bronze Age, around 1500 BC.) and there were no signs of burial within the circle or the cairn.

== See also ==
- List of axial five-stone circles
- List of megalithic monuments in Cork
