= Derryarkane Stone Circle =

- Liagchiorcal Dhoire Uí Earcáin (Irish)
- Location within Ireland
- 51.727815°N 9.372633°W
- Type: axial stone circle
- Location: Derryarkane, Kealkill, County Cork, Ireland

History
- Built: c. 2500–2000 BC

Site notes
- Owner: State

National monument of Ireland
- Official name: Derryarkane
- Reference no.: 600

Derryarkane Stone Circle is an axial stone circle and National Monument located in County Cork, Ireland.

== Location ==
Derryarkane Stone Circle is located 2.4 km (1.5 mi) south of Kealkill.

== History ==
The stone circles were built c. 2500 BC. Five-stone circles like that at Derryarkane are believed to be later in date.

== Description ==
Derryarkane is a stone circle of five stones. The axis of the circle is NE-SW with the axial stone at the southwest.
