= Terence Meaden =

English author

- Born: George Terence Meaden
- Occupations: author, archaeologist

Terence Meaden is an English retired physicist and an author who writes on archaeoastronomy, mostly focusing on the megalithic sites of Avebury and Stonehenge in England, and the Drombeg stone circle in Cork, Ireland. Meaden is influenced by the work of archaeologist Marija Gimbutas who wrote about the Goddess worshipping Neolithic and Bronze Age cultures of "Old Europe".

== Biography ==
Meaden was born in Wiltshire and attended Trowbridge Boys' High School. He has a doctoral degrees in physics from the University of Oxford and a master's degree in applied landscape archaeology from the same university.

== Hieros gamos ==
Meaden argues it was the power of a strong religious narrative that underlies the purpose of these megaliths. Drombeg stone circle is based on the cosmological fertility drama of the marriage of the sky God and earth Goddess known to the Classical Greeks much later as the hieros gamos. He states that the same principles also explain the placement of megaliths at Avebury and Stonehenge, although both sites are now damaged and incomplete. Fertility symbolism explains the religious elements behind the culture of the farming communities who were dependent on the timely arrival of seasonal weather and the fertility of crops, livestock and women.

In pre-literate times, Neolithic people expressed meaning through images and symbols displayed at stone circles. Meaden determined the core idea behind the building of Stonehenge and Avebury by spotting and interpreting key symbolism. A documentary filmed in 1998 for Channel 4 and the Discovery Channel detailed his hieros gamos concept.

At Stonehenge on midsummer morning, a phallic shadow is cast from the "Heel" stone; this penetrates to the centre of the monument where its tip touches the "Goddess" stone. In his book, "Stonehenge, Avebury and Drombeg Stone Circle Deciphered", he wrote that most stone circles were planned as sunrise fertility monuments, and so need to be studied at sunrise.

Meaden writes that the Neolithic calendar was based on the eight festival dates of traditional agriculture, corresponding roughly to the pagan Wheel of the Year.

Meaden studied Drombeg in 2018, writing: "The summer solstice marks the occasion of the consummation of the classic Marriage of the Gods, uniting the Sky Father with the Earth Mother. This act of consummation between stones representing divinities was devised as an action spectacle for the Neolithic people".

== Bibliography ==
- The Circles Effect And It's Mysteries (Artetech Publishing Company, 1989)
- The Goddess of the Stones: Language of the Megaliths Hardcover (Souvenir Press, 1991)
- Stonehenge: The Secret of the Solstice (Souvenir Press, 1997)
- The Secret of the Avebury Stones (Souvenir Press, 1999)
- Stonehenge, Avebury and Drombeg Stone Circles Deciphered: The archaeological decoding of the core symbolism and meanings planned into these ancient British and Irish monuments (LAP Lambert Academic Publishing, 2016)
- A New Bible in Three Testaments: The Book of the Universe, Stars, Sun, Earth, Life and Humankind (New Generation Publishing, 2018)
- The Old Stones: A Field Guide to the Megalithic Sites of Britain and Ireland (Watkins Publishing, 2018) Contributor
