= Stone circle =

Ring of standing stones

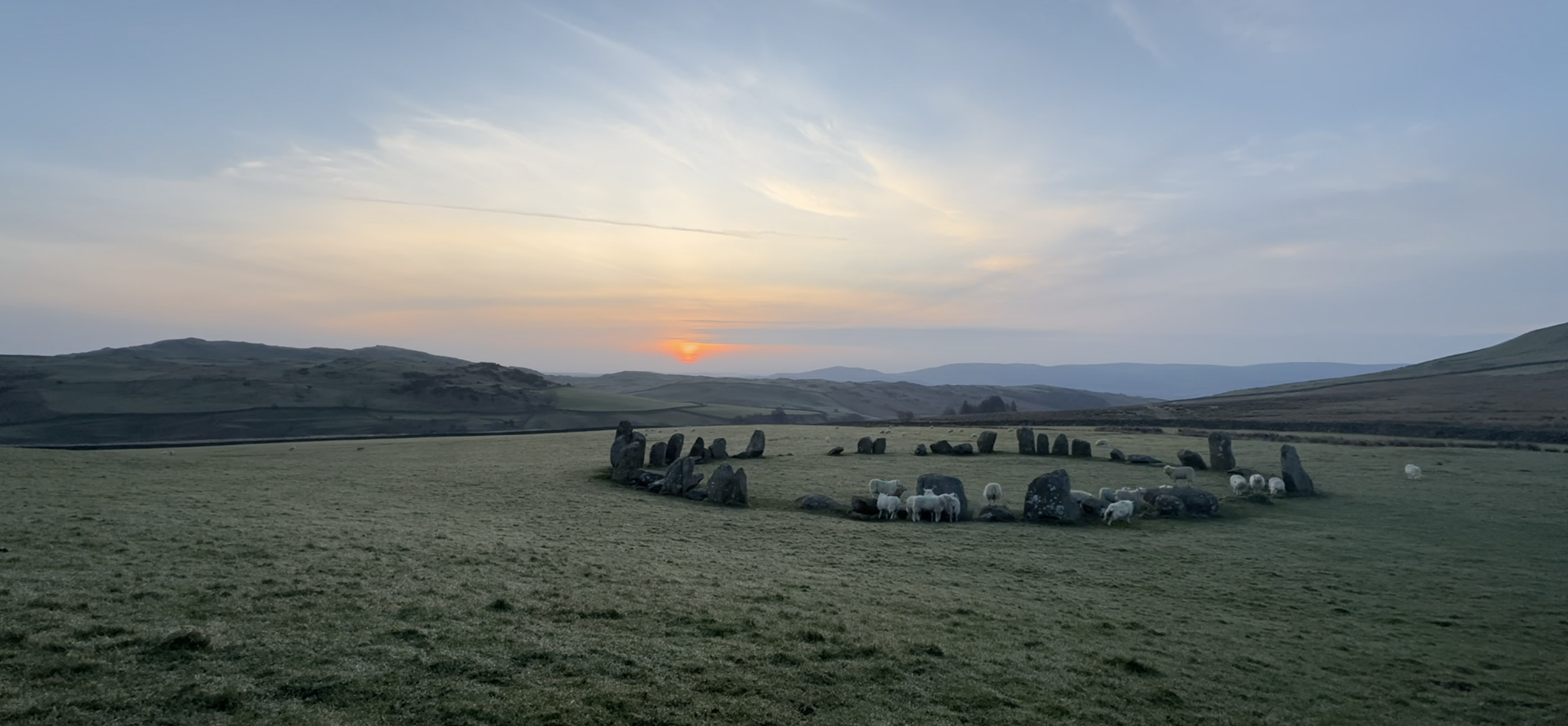
Swinside stone circle on the vernal equinox, in Cumbria, England

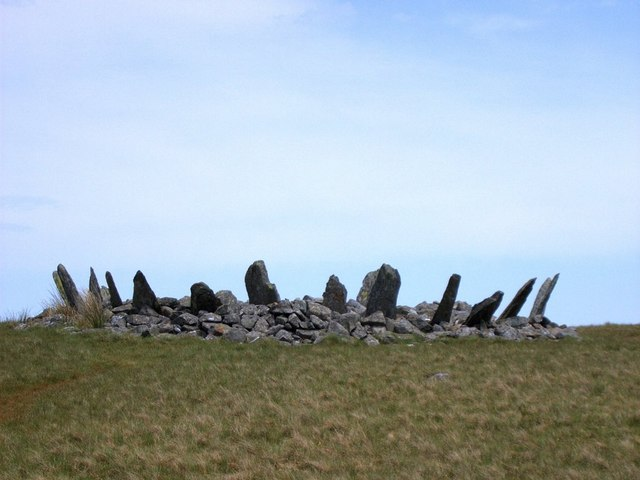
Bryn Cader Faner, North Wales, a Welsh ring cairn / tumulus often misinterpreted as a stone circle

A stone circle is a ring of megalithic standing stones. Most are found in Northwestern Europe – especially Stone circles in the British Isles and Brittany – and typically date from the Late Neolithic and Early Bronze Age, with most being built between 3300 and 2500 BC. The best known examples include those at the henge monument at Avebury, the Rollright Stones, Castlerigg, and elements within the ring of standing stones at Stonehenge. Scattered examples exist from other parts of Europe. Later, during the Iron Age, stone circles were built in southern Scandinavia.

The archetypical stone circle is an uncluttered enclosure, large enough to congregate inside, and composed of megalithic stones. Often similar structures are named 'stone circle', but these names are either historic, or incorrect. Examples of commonly misinterpreted stone circles are ring cairns, burial mounds, and kerb cairns. Although it is often assumed there are thousands of stone circles across the British Isles and Europe, such enclosures are actually very rare, and constitute a regional form of henge. Examples of true stone circles include Long Meg and Her Daughters in Cumbria, henges with inner stones such as Avebury in Wiltshire, and The Merry Maidens in Cornwall.

Stone circles are usually grouped in terms of the shape and size of the stones, the span of their radius, and their population within the local area. Although many theories have been advanced to explain their use, usually related to providing a setting for ceremony or ritual, no consensus exists among archaeologists regarding their intended function. Their construction often involved considerable communal effort, including specialist tasks such as planning, quarrying, transportation, laying the foundation trenches, and final construction.

== Dates and archaeology ==
Growing evidence suggests that megalithic constructions began as early as 5000 BC in northwestern France and that the custom and techniques spread via sea routes throughout Europe and the Mediterranean region from there. The Carnac Stones in France are estimated to have been built around 4500 BC, and many of the formations include megalithic stone circles.

The earliest stone circles in Britain were erected 3200–2500 BC, during the Middle Neolithic (c. 3200–2500 BC). Around that time, stone circles began to be built in the coastal and lowland areas towards the north of the United Kingdom. The Langdale axe industry in the Lake District may have been an important early centre for circle building, perhaps because of its economic power. Many had closely set stones, perhaps similar to the earth banks of henges. Others were constructed from boulders placed stably on the ground rather than standing stones held erect by a foundation trench. Recent research shows that the two oldest stone circles in Britain (Stenness on Orkney and Callanish on the Isle of Lewis) were constructed to align with solar and lunar positions.

Most sites do not contain evidence of human dwelling, suggesting that stone circles were constructed for ceremonies. Sometimes, a stone circle is found in association with a burial pit or burial chamber, but most of these monuments have no such known association because of a lack of archaeological investigation.

== Variants ==
=== Recumbent and axial stone circle ===
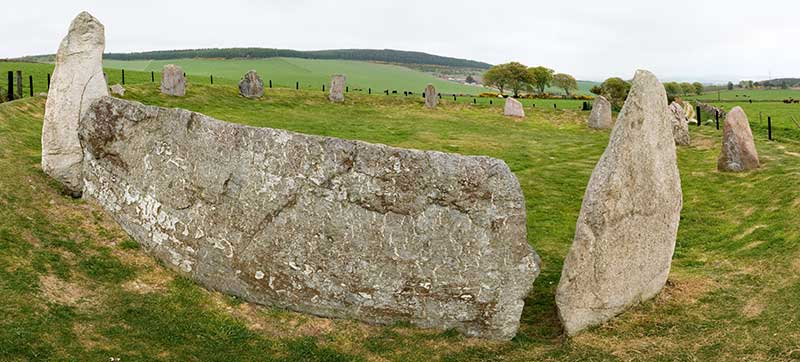
Easter Aquhorthies recumbent stone circle near Inverurie, Aberdeenshire, Scotland

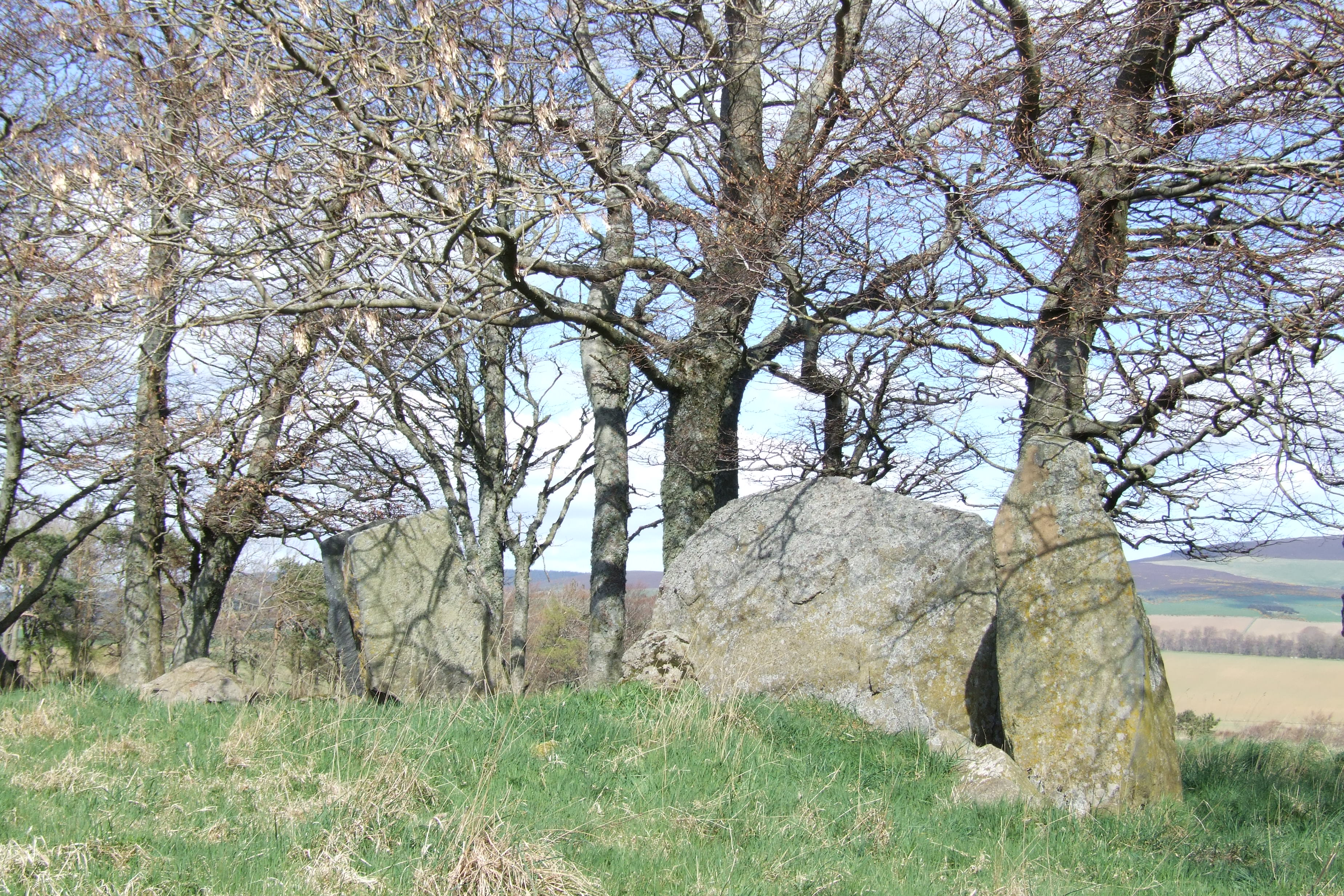
Dunnideer recumbent stone circle near Insch, Aberdeenshire, Scotland

Recumbent stone circles are a variation containing a single large stone placed on its side. The stones are often ordered by height, with the tallest being the portals, with gradually reducing heights around each side of the circle, down to the recumbent stone, which is the lowest. This type is found throughout the British Isles and Brittany, with 71 examples in Scotland and at least 20 in south-west Ireland. In the latter nation they are generally called axial stone circles, including Drombeg stone circle near Rosscarbery, County Cork.

Scottish recumbent circles are usually flanked by the two largest of the standing stones immediately on either side. These are known as 'flankers'. The stones are commonly graded in height with the lowest stones being diametrically opposite to the tall flankers. The circle commonly contains a ring cairn and cremation remains.

Irish axial stone circles are found in Cork and Kerry counties. These do not have tall flanking stones on either side of the recumbent stone. Instead, there are two tall stones at the side of the circle opposite the recumbent stone. These are known as 'portals', as they form an entrance into the circle. Often the portals are turned so that their flat sides face each other, rather than facing the centre of the circle.

== Distribution ==
Megalithic monuments are found in especially great number on the European Atlantic fringe and in the British Isles.

=== Great Britain and Ireland ===
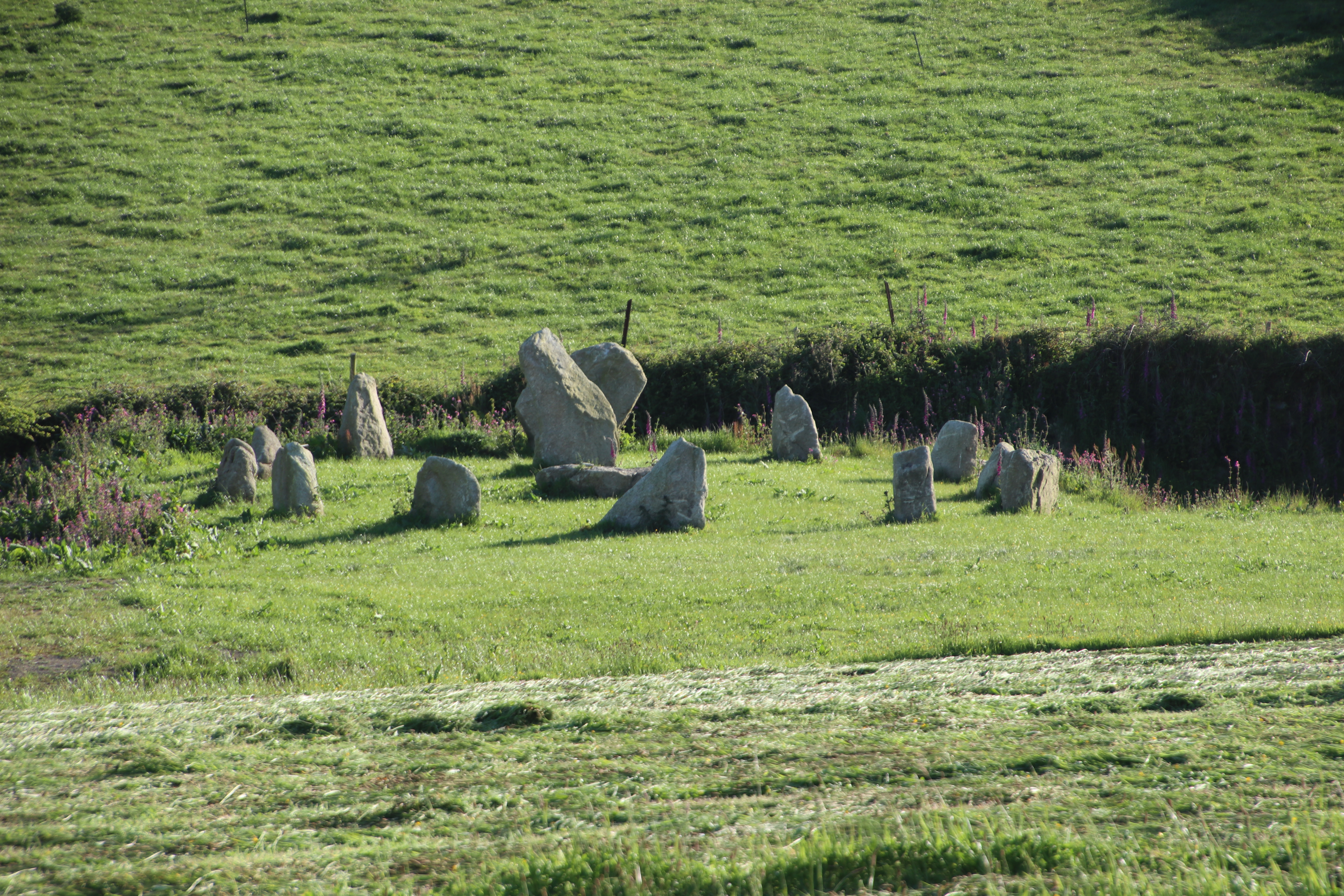
Cornish stone circle

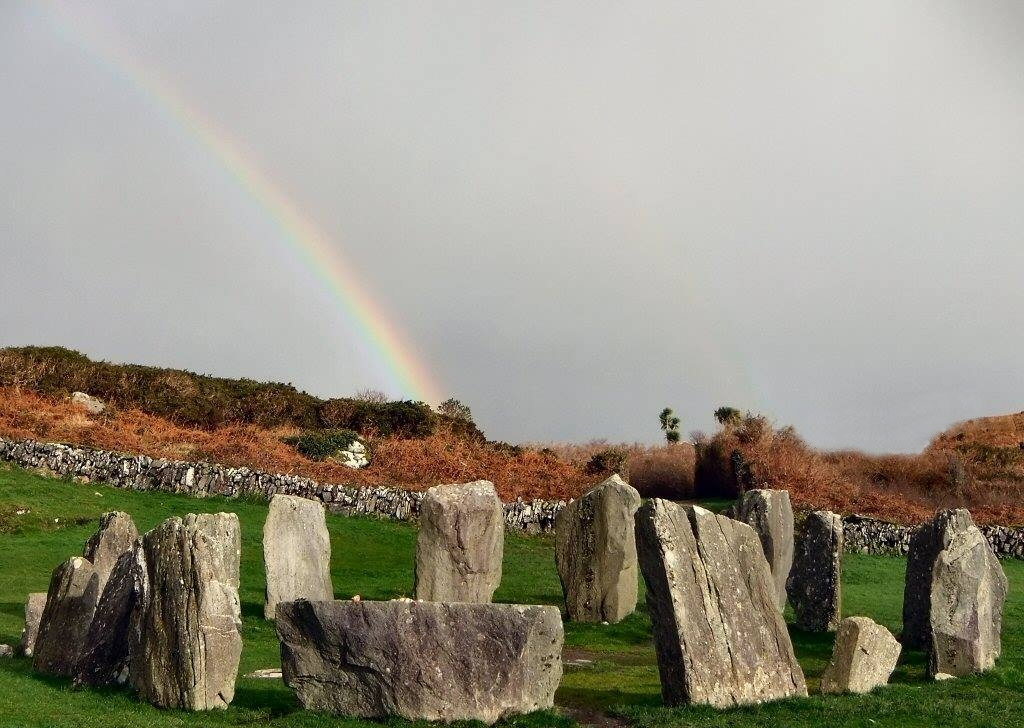
Drombeg stone circle, County Cork, Ireland

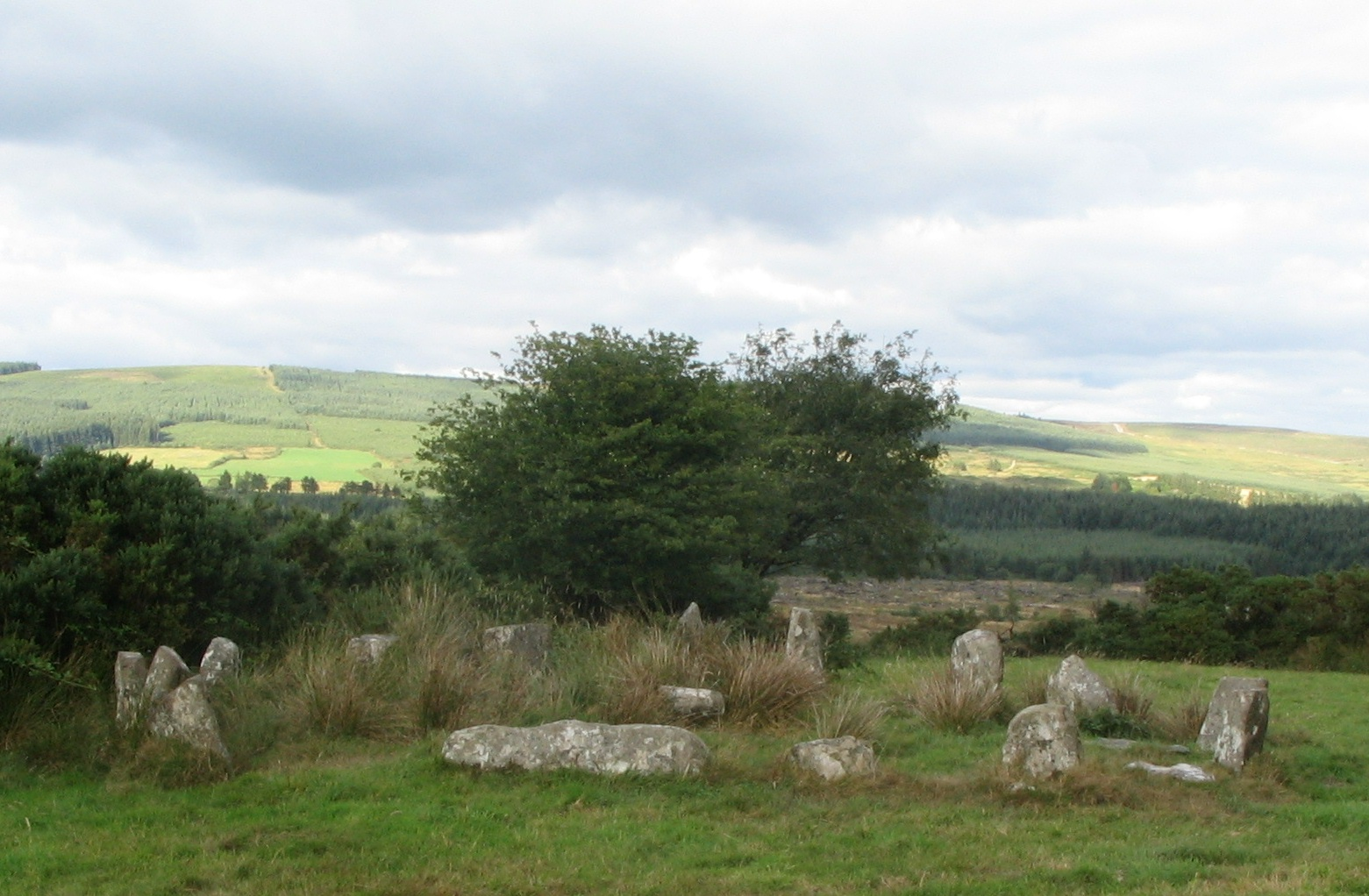
Stone circle at the Carrigagulla complex, County Cork, Ireland

There are approximately 1300 stone circles in Britain and Ireland. Experts disagree on whether the construction of megaliths in Britain developed independently or was imported from mainland Europe.

A 2019 comprehensive radiocarbon dating study of megalithic structures across Europe and the British Isles concluded that construction techniques were spread to other communities via sea routes, starting from north-western France. In contrast, the French archaeologist Jean-Pierre Mohen in his book Le Monde des Megalithes wrote that the British Isles are

"outstanding in the abundance of standing stones, and the variety of circular architectural complexes of which they formed a part ... strikingly original, they have no equivalent elsewhere in Europe – strongly supporting the argument that the builders were independent."

Some theories suggest that invaders from Brittany may have been responsible for constructing Stonehenge.

Although stone circles are widely distributed across the island, Ireland has two main concentrations: in the Cork/Kerry area and in mid-Ulster. The latter typically consist of a greater number of small stones, usually 1' (0.3 metres) high, and are often found in upland areas and on sites that also contain a stone alignment. The Cork–Kerry stone circles tend to be more irregular in shape with larger but fewer and more widely-spaced orthostats around the axial stone.

=== Continental Europe ===
Examples can be found throughout Continental Europe, from the Black Sea to Brittany. Locations in France include several in Brittany (two on the island of Er Lannic and two more suggested at Carnac), several in the south of France on the Causse de Blandas in the Cevennes, in the Pyrenees, and in the Alps (e.g. the Petit Saint Bernard). One notable stone circle is in the Italian Alps. As early as 1579, scholars in Germany described large erect stone circles near Ballenstedt. In 2001, a stone circle (Beglik Tash) was discovered in Bulgaria near the Black Sea.

There are several examples in the Alentejo region of Portugal, the oldest and most complete being the Almendres Cromlech near the regional capital of Évora and within its municipality. Remains of many others consist only of the central anta (as they are known in Portugal). This sometimes appears to have been used as an altar but more often as a central burial structure, originally surrounded by megaliths that show only sparsely survived erosion and human activities.

These circles are also known as harrespil in the Basque country, where villagers call them mairu-baratz or jentil-baratz, meaning "pagan garden (cemetery)". They refer to mythological giants of the pre-Christian era. No example has survived in a good state of preservation, but, like the Alentejo, the Basque Country is dotted with eroded and vandalized examples of many such structures.

=== Africa ===
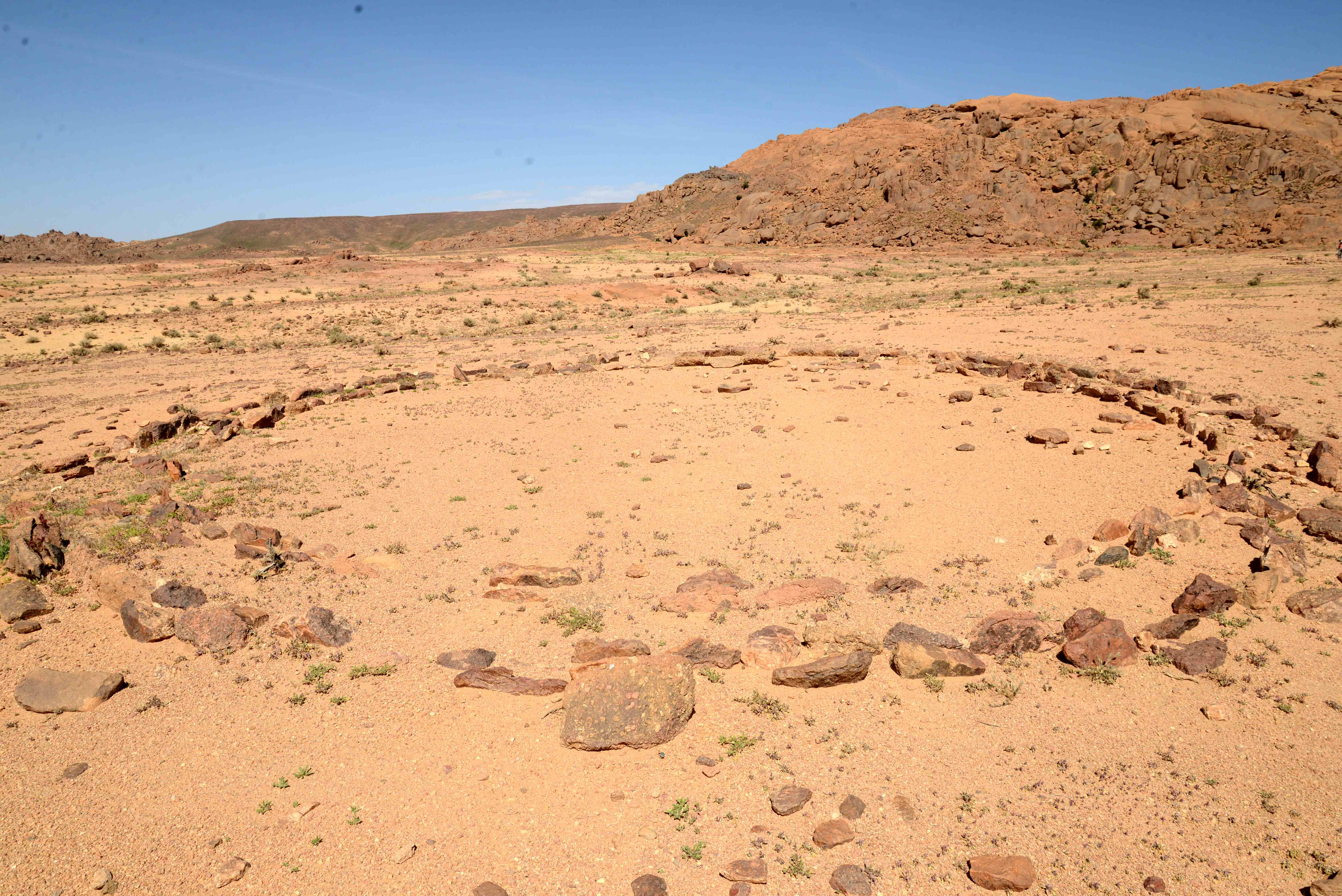
Stone circle in the Hoggar Mountains in the Algerian Sahara

Ancient stone circles are found throughout the Horn of Africa. Booco in northeastern Somalia contains a number of such old structures. Small stone circles here surround two enclosed platform monuments, which are set together. The circles of stone are believed to mark associated graves.

At Emba Derho in the Ethiopian Highlands and Eritrean Highlands, two kinds of megalithic circles are found. The first type consists of single stone circles, whereas the second type comprises an inner circle enclosed within a larger circle (i.e. double stone circles).

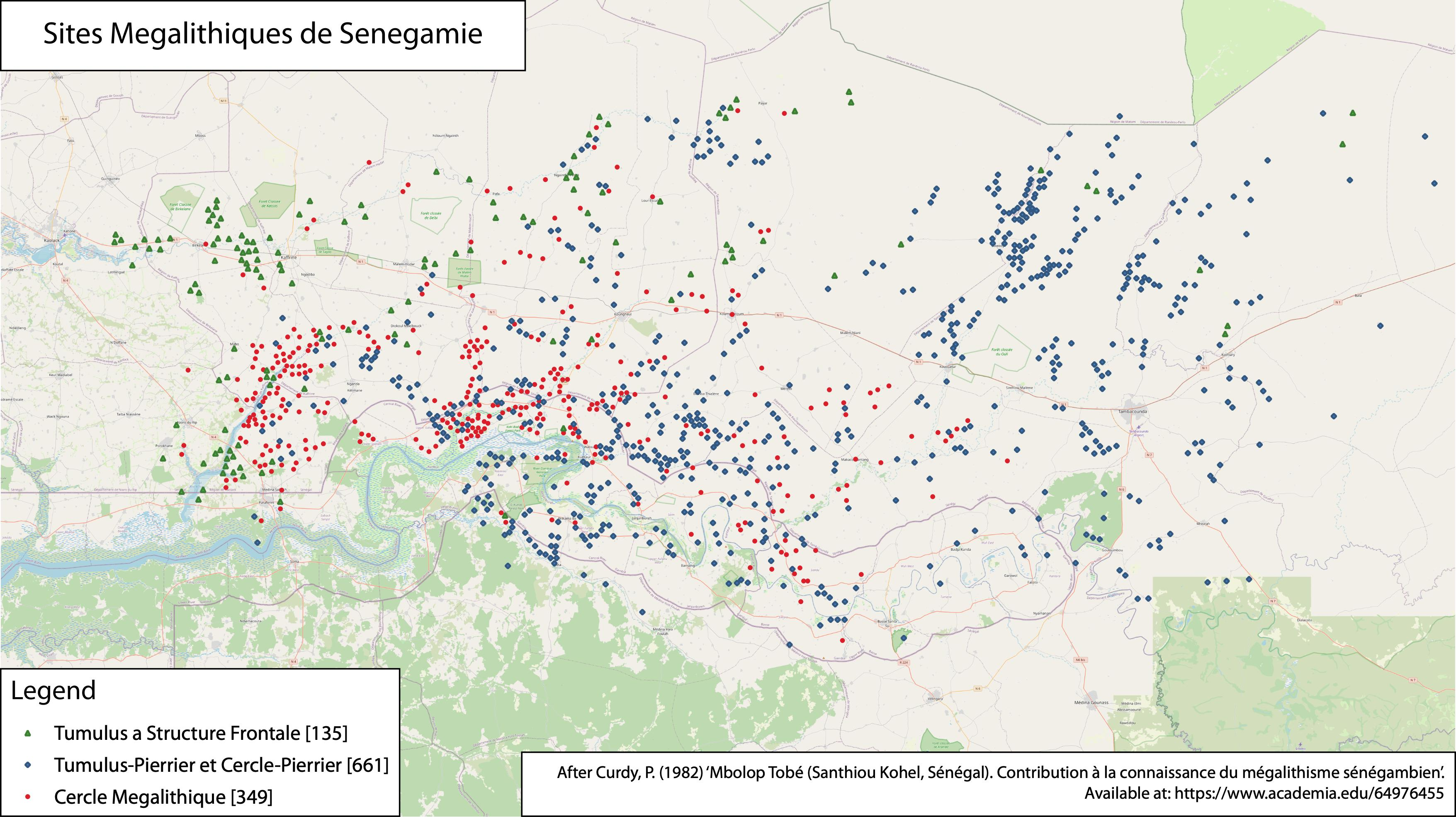
Stone circles and other megalithic monuments in Senegambia.

The Senegambian stone circles are found on the western side of the continent. The individual groups are dated from 700 A.D. to 1350 A.D, and 1145 sites were mapped in a 1982 study.

=== Asia ===
In the Near East, possibly the oldest stone circles in the world were found at Atlit Yam (about 8000 BC). The locality is now submerged near the Levantine Mediterranean coast.

Other locations include India or Japan. See more in the relevant Wikipedia category.

The Jomon, a foraging group of northern Japan, built several monuments, including stone circles dating back to 2500-300 BCE. The most famous Jomon circles, known as the Manza and Nonakado circles, were discovered at Oyu in 1913 and were constructed between 4,200 and 2,700 years ago. The twin circles surround a central sundial aligned with the midwinter sunrise. Archaeologists have theorized that they were used as burial sites as high levels of phosphate were found beneath them or to display seasonal foodstuffs. Other nearby stone circles face the Shirakami mountain range and the Omori-Katsuyama stone circle, aligned with the winter solstice sunset over Mount Iwaki.

Unlike the European stone megaliths, stone circles in Japan were circular arrangements of stone settings inlaid in the ground. Each stone weighed between a few pounds to over 220 pounds. Both Japanese and European stone circles, however, shared similar purposes, including marking astrological alignments, seasonal ceremonies, burial rituals, and ancestral communications.

== See also ==
- Senegambian Stone Circles
