= Drombeg stone circle =

Stone circle in County Cork, Ireland

- Ciorcal an Droma Bhig
- Druid's Altar
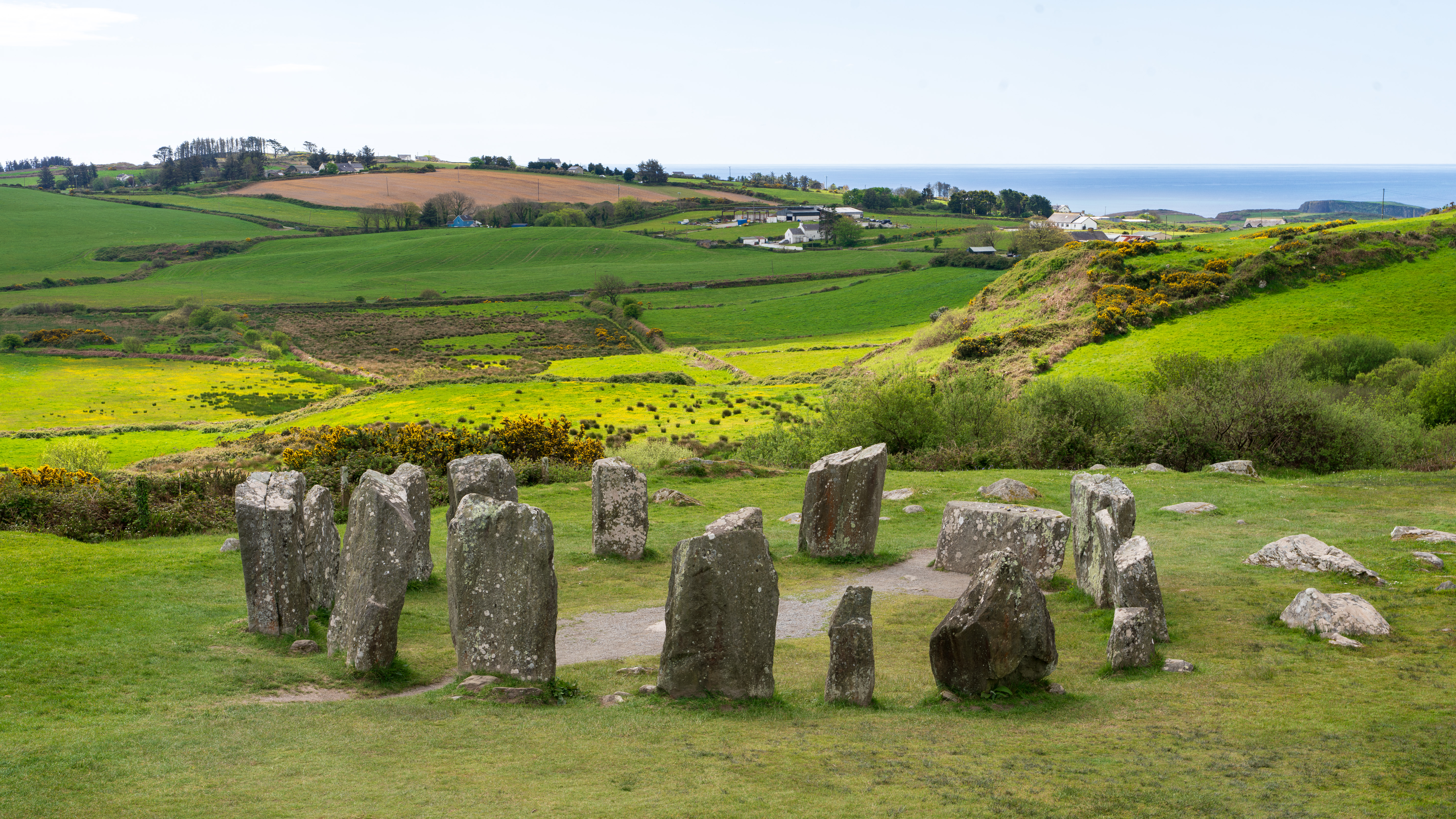
- Drombeg site, looking south

- Location of site in Ireland
- 51.56456°N 9.08702°W
- Type: Axial stone circle
- Periods: Bronze Age to early Iron Age
- Location: County Cork, Ireland; Irish Grid: W245352)

Site notes
- Height: 1.8 metres (5 ft 11 in) (highest stone)
- Area: 9.3 metres (31 ft) (diameter)
- Archaeologists: Edward M. Fahy (1957)
- Management: National Monument Service
- Public access: Yes

National monument of Ireland
- Reference no.: 381

Drombeg stone circle (also known as The Druid's Altar) is a small axial stone circle located 2.4 km (1.5 mi) east of Glandore, County Cork, Ireland.

Although not an especially significant example, Drombeg is one of the most visited megalithic sites in Ireland, and is protected under the National Monuments Act. It was excavated in 1958, when the cremated remains of an adolescent were found in a pot in the circle's centre.

== Features ==
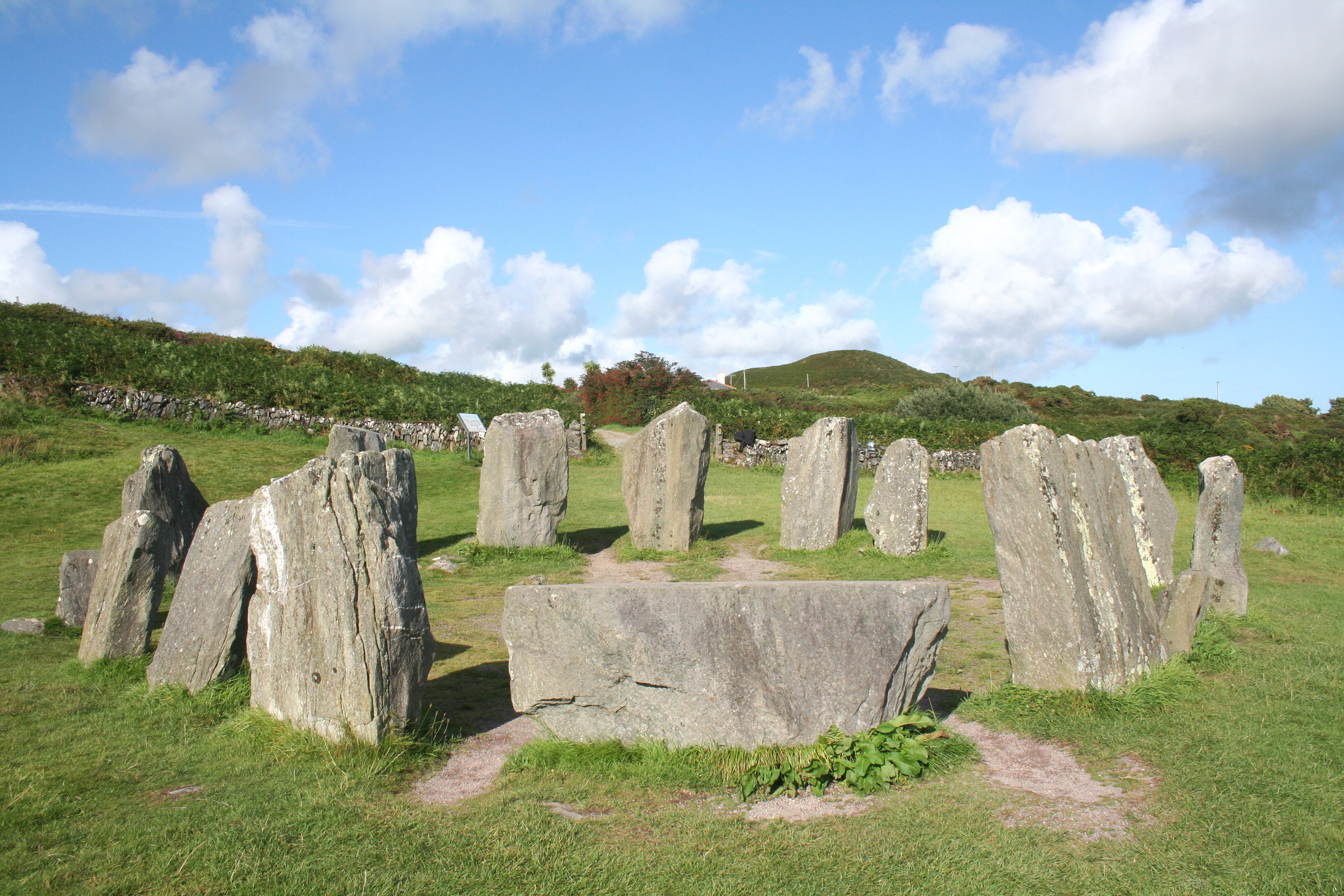
Site at Drombeg

The stone circle originally consisted of seventeen closely spaced stones of which 13 survive. The stones are made from local sandstone. The circle spans 9.3 metres (31 ft) in diameter. As an axial or "Cork–Kerry" stone circle, it contains two taller entrance stones placed opposite a recumbent axial stone. Its axis is orientated south west towards the setting sun.

The most westerly stone (1.9m long) is the long recumbent and has two egg shaped cup-marks, one with a ring around it. An axial stone circle, also known as a "Cork–Kerry type" stone circle, it is flanked by a pair of 1.8m high axial portal stones, which mark the entrance to the stone circle, and face the recumbent altar stone. This arrangement creates a south-west axis, and orients the monument in the direction of the setting sun during the midwinter solstice.

Terence Meaden suggests that a petroglyph, on the northern side of one stone, is of an erect phallus with two testicles, about 200 millimetres (7.9 in) long. While a further carving, 280 millimetres (11 in) and 160 millimetres (6.3 in) wide on the upper surface of one of the recumbent stones and previously identified as an "axe-like outline", is vulvar in nature. Both carvings are prehistoric.

Near the stone circle, approximately 40m to the west, are two round stone-walled prehistoric huts and a fulacht fiadh. Evidence suggests the fulacht fiadh was in use until approximately the 5th century AD. Of the two huts, the largest had a timber roof supported by timber posts. The smaller hut contains the remains of a cooking spot on its eastern side. A causeway leads from the huts to the fulacht fiadh, which has a hearth, well and a water trough.

== Excavations ==
Following a number of surveys in the early 1900s, the site was excavated and restored in 1957. Radiocarbon dating of samples taken from the site suggest that it was active c. 1100–800 BC. An inverted pot, found in the centre of the circle, contained the cremated remains of a young adolescent wrapped with thick cloth. The pot was found close to the centre of the circle and was found alongside smashed sherds and a collection of sweepings from a pyre.

== Gallery ==
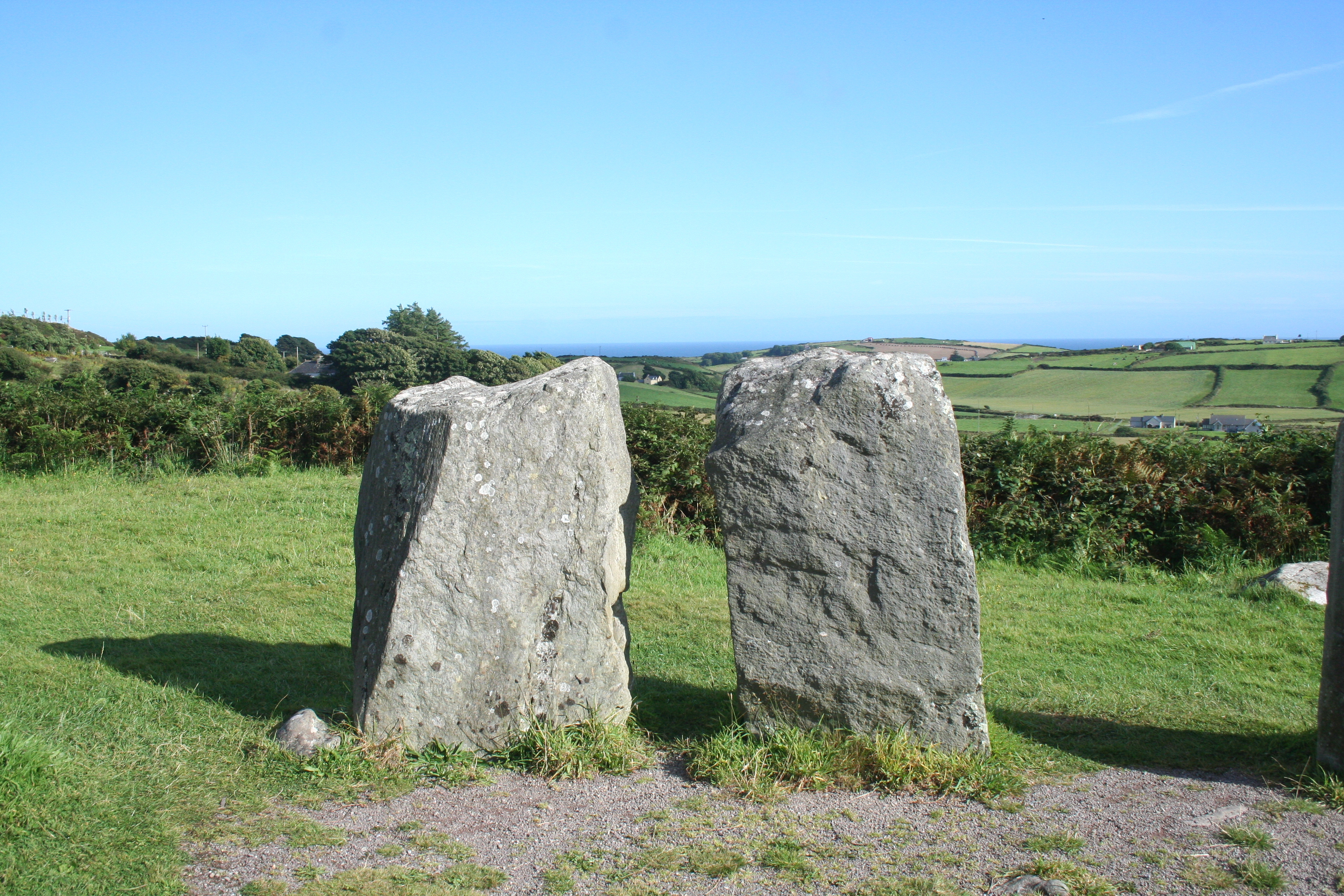
Portal stones

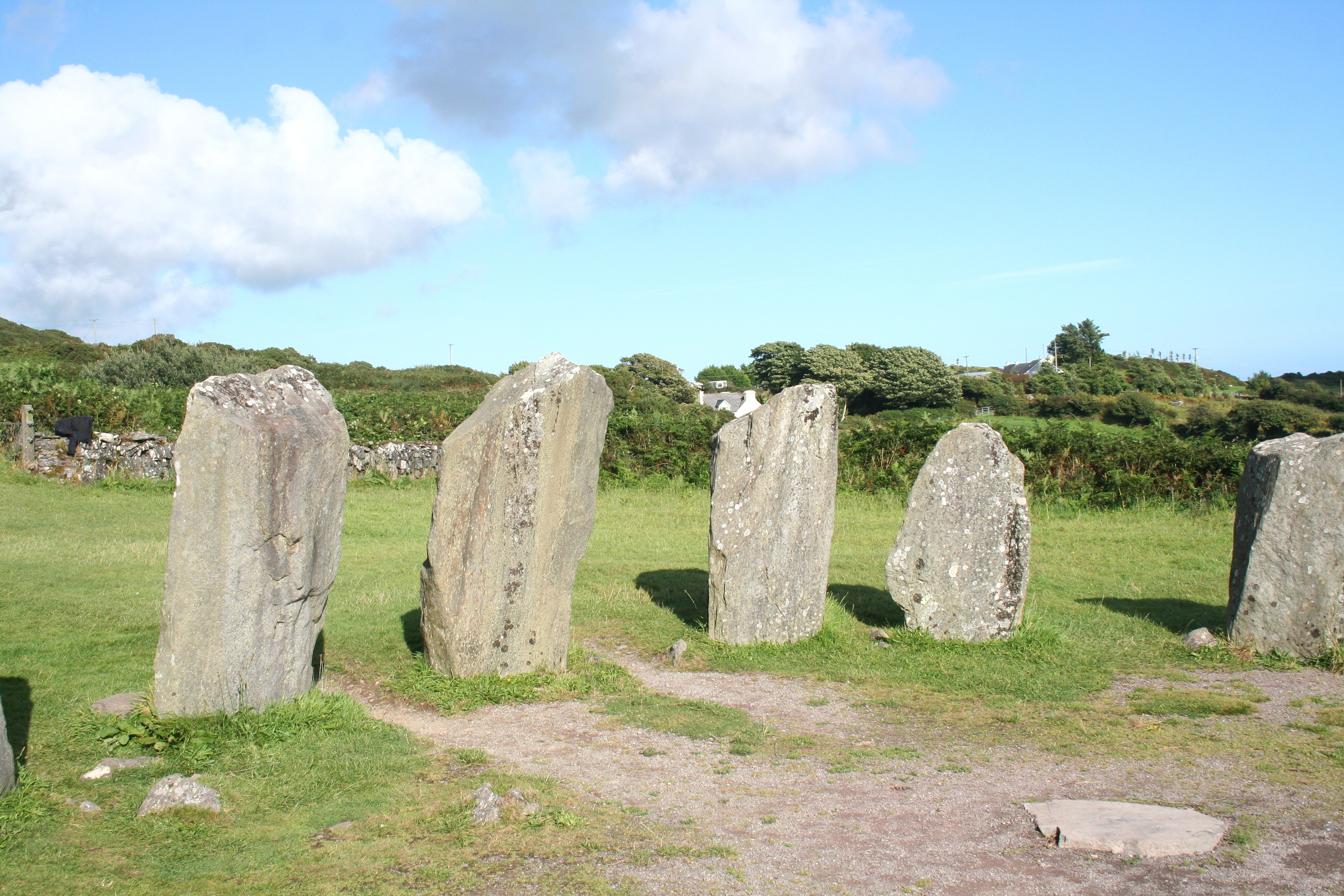
Slabs on the west side

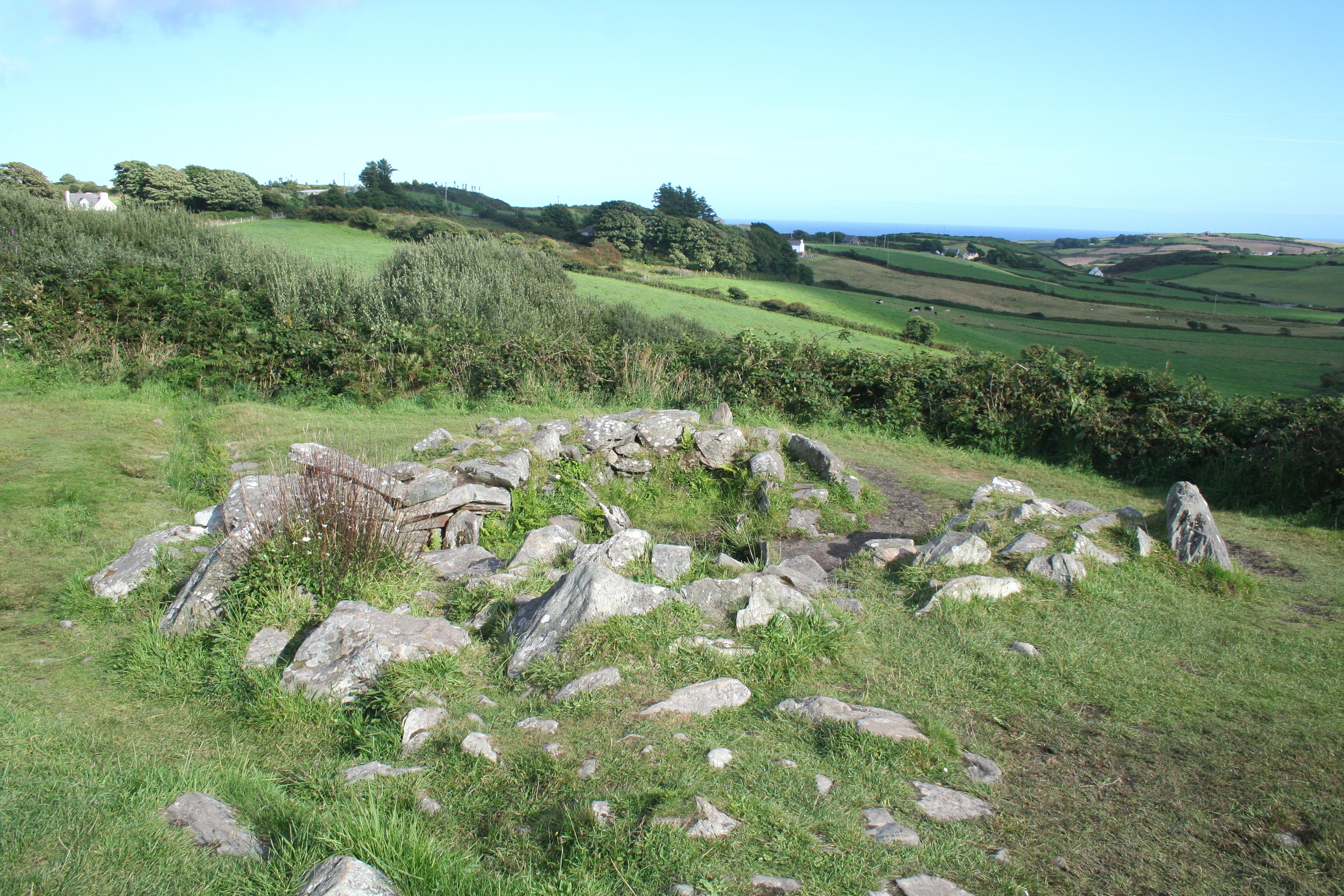
Cooking place

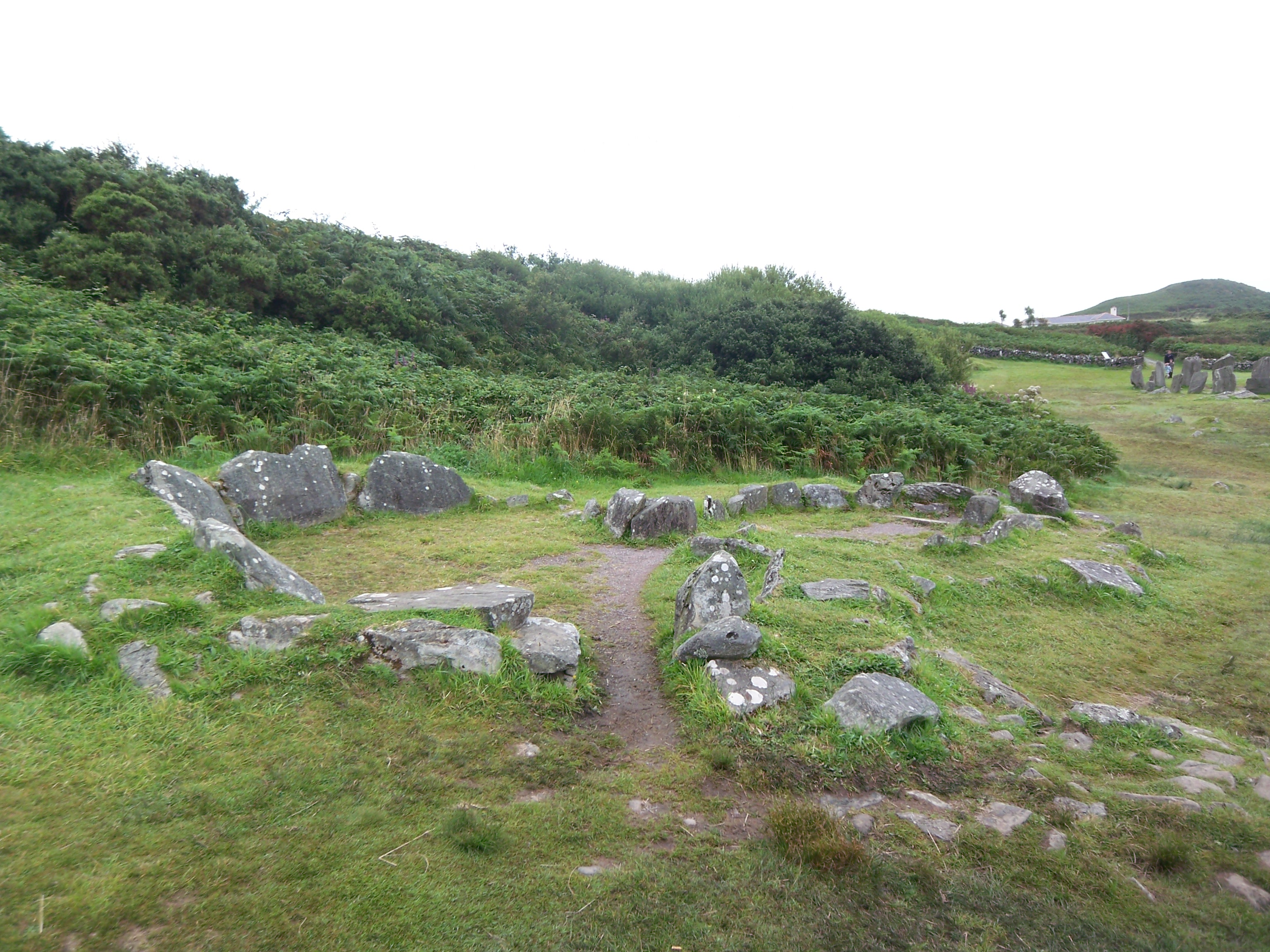
Dwelling remains
