= Bohonagh =

Archaeological site in Ireland

Coordinates: 51.580102°N 8.998987°W

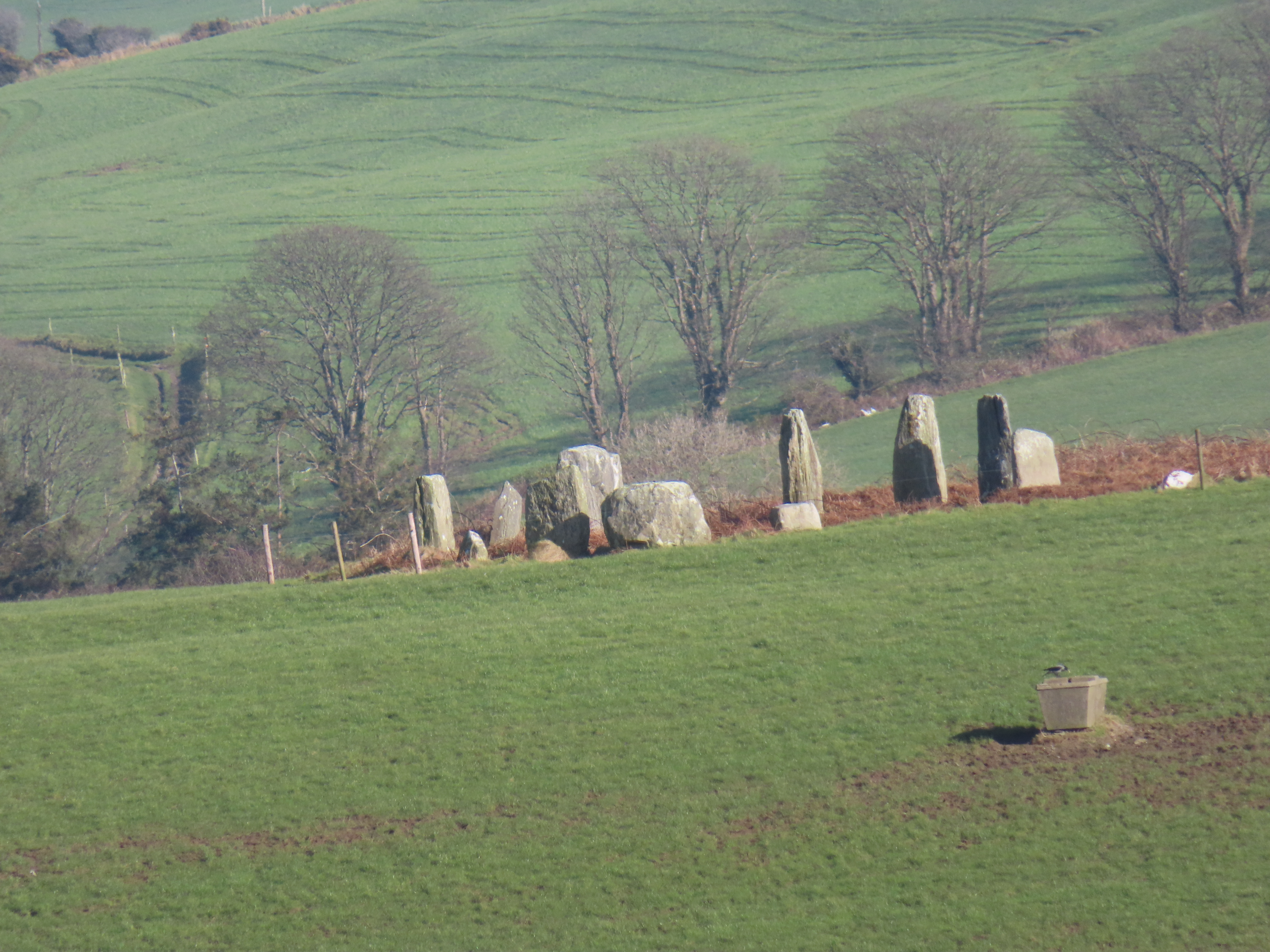
Bohonagh Stone Circle

Bohonagh is an axial stone circle located 2.4 km east of Rosscarbery, County Cork, Ireland. The circle is thought to date from the Bronze Age. A boulder burial is sited nearby (grid ref: 308 368).

== Features ==
The stone circle comprised 13 stones set in a circle with a diameter of 30 feet (9 m). Four out of the 13 stones are missing and three were re-erected after excavation. Two portal stones are set radially on an east–west axis to the recumbent stones and are 240 centimetres (7 ft 10 in) high. At just under 8 feet (2.4 m), these stone are among the tallest of any Irish stone circle. The axis from these stones to the large axial-stone on the west side, points to sunset at the equinoxes. Many of the stones have quartz inclusions and many small pieces of quartz are associated with the circle.

A boulder burial (dolmen) is sited 20 metres (70 ft) east of the circle, and its large capstone (weighing almost 20 tons) has seven or more small cup-marks on the upper surface. Two of the three small supporting stones are of quartz and a fourth has been uprooted. A nearby loose slab also features cup-marks. The complex, which included a wooden house (which had been excavated) is of Bronze Age date.

== Excavations ==
In 1959 the site was excavated and a central pit containing charcoal and cremated bone was found.

== Sources ==
- McNally, Kenneth (2006). "Ireland's Ancient Stones" (Belfast: Appletree Press). ISBN 0-86281-996-2
