= Breeny More Stone Circle =

- Liagchiorcal na mBruíne Móra (Irish)
- Location within Ireland
- 51.742145°N 9.375097°W
- Type: axial stone circle
- Location: Breeny More, Kealkill, County Cork, Ireland

History
- Built: 1500–1000 BC

Site notes
- Elevation: 134 m (440 ft)
- Height: 2.42 m (8 feet)
- Owner: Office of Public Works

National monument of Ireland
- Official name: Breeny More
- Reference no.: 450

Breeny More Stone Circle is an axial stone circle and National Monument located in County Cork, Ireland.

== Location ==
Breeny More Stone Circle is situated 1 km (0.62 mi) southeast of Kealkill, overlooking Bantry Bay to the west. Another stone circle lies 175 m (574 ft) to the northeast.

== History ==
Boulder burials of this type are believed to date from the middle Bronze Age, i.e. 1500–1000 BC. The toponym is from the Irish brúine móra, "great dwellings of the fairies."

== Description ==
This is a stone circle with four boulder burials. The circle has two entrance stones and an axial stone, with a main axis measuring 14 m (46 ft). It has a southeast–northwest axis, facing the rising sun.

A "boulder burial" is a single large boulder sitting on three or four support stones; the term was coined by Seán Ó Nualláin in the 1970s. They are generally found in the southwest, and associated with standing stones and stone circles; some dispute that there were ever burial sites, as no human remains have ever been recovered.
