= Megalithic architectural elements =

Architectural elements typical of European megalithic structures

Several megalithic architectural elements are characteristic of European Stone Age structures.

== Forecourt ==
In archaeology, a forecourt is the name given to the area in front of certain types of chamber tomb. Forecourts were probably the venue for ritual practices connected with the burial and commemoration of the dead in the past societies that built these types of tombs.

In European megalithic architecture, forecourts are curved in plan with the entrance to the tomb at the apex of the open semicircle enclosure that the forecourt creates. The sides were built up by either large upright stones or walls of smaller stones laid atop one another.

Some also had paved floors and some had blocking stones erected in front of them to seal the tomb such as at West Kennet Long Barrow. Their shape, which suggests an attempt to focus attention on the tomb itself may mean that they were used ceremonially as a kind of open air auditorium during ceremonies. Excavation within some forecourts has recovered animal bone, pottery and evidence of burning suggesting that they served as locations for votive offerings or feasting dedicated to the dead.

== Kerb or peristalith ==
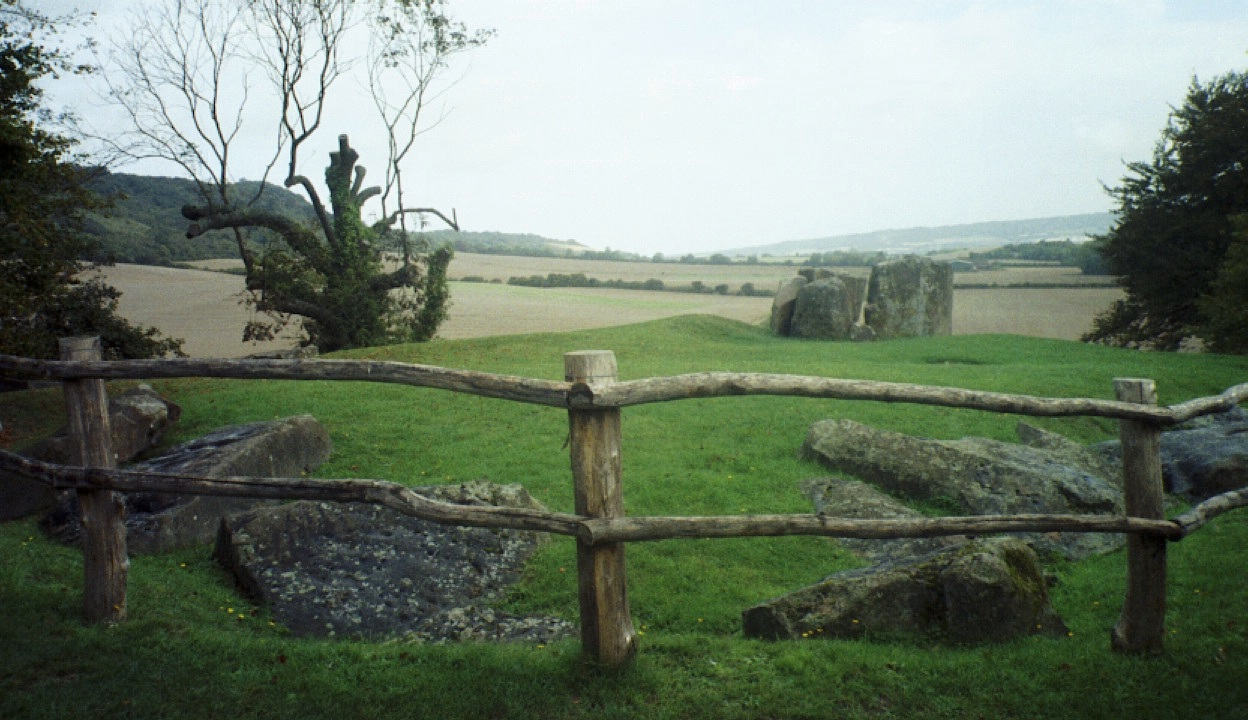
Although the barrow mound is now almost gone, the surrounding peristalith at Coldrum Stones in Kent still survives (foreground). The stone burial chamber can be seen in the background.

In archaeology, kerb or peristalith is the name for a stone ring built to enclose and sometimes revet the cairn or barrow built over a chamber tomb.

European dolmens, especially hunebed and dyss burials, often provide examples of the use of kerbs in megalithic architecture but they were also added to other kinds of chamber tomb. Kerbs may be built in a dry stone wall method employing small blocks or more commonly using larger stones set in the ground. When larger stones are employed, peristalith is the term more properly used. Often, when the earth barrow has been weathered away, the surviving kerb can give the impression of being a stone circle although these monuments date from considerably later. Excavation of barrows without stone rings such as Fussell's Lodge in Wiltshire suggests that, in these examples, timber or turf was used to define a kerb instead.

In the British Isles, the enclosing nature of kerbs has been suggested to be analogous to later Neolithic and Bronze Age stone and timber circles and henges which also demonstrate an attempt to demarcate a distinct, round area for ritual or funerary purposes. Notable sites with kerbs include Newgrange where many of the stones are etched with megalithic art. An example of the dry stone wall type of kerb can be seen at Parc le Breos in Wales.

== Orthostat ==
An orthostat is a large stone with a more or less slab-like shape that has been artificially set upright (so a cube-shaped block is not an orthostat). Menhirs and other standing stones are technically orthostats although the term is used by archaeologists only to describe individual prehistoric stones that constitute part of larger structures. Common examples include the walls of chamber tombs and other megalithic monuments, and the vertical elements of the trilithons at Stonehenge. Especially later, orthostats may be carved with decoration in relief, a common feature of Hittite architecture and Assyrian sculpture among other styles. In the latter case, orthostats are large thin slabs of gypsum neatly and carefully formed, for use as a wall-facing secured by metal fixings and carrying reliefs, which were then painted.

Many orthostats were a focus for megalithic art, as at Knowth in Ireland.

In the context of classical Greek architecture the term orthostate is usually used.

== Port-hole slab ==
In megalithic archaeology a port-hole slab is the name of an orthostat with a hole in it sometimes found forming the entrance to a chamber tomb. The hole is usually circular but square examples or those made from two adjoining slabs each with a notch cut in it are known. They are common in the gallery graves of the Seine-Oise-Marne culture.

== Portal stones ==
Portal stones are a pair of Megalithic orthostats, usually flanking the entrance to a chamber tomb or opposite the axial stone of an axial stone circle. They are commonly found in dolmens. Examples may be seen at Bohonagh and Knocknakilla.

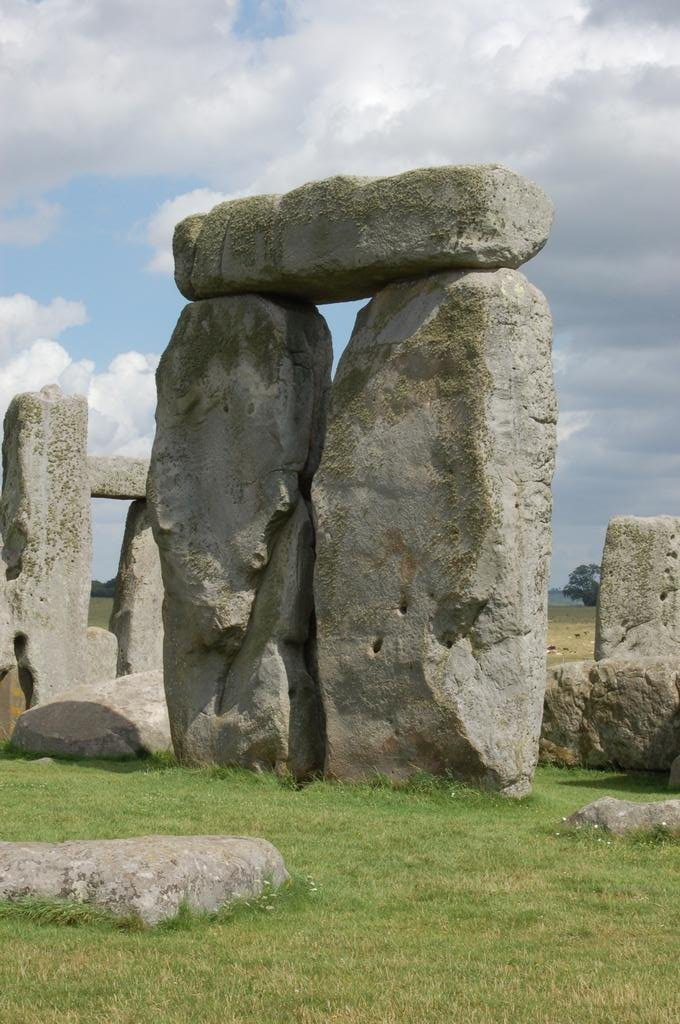
A trilithon at Stonehenge

== Trilithon ==
A trilithon (or trilith) is a structure consisting of two large vertical stones supporting a third stone set horizontally across the top. Commonly used in the context of megalithic monuments, the most famous trilithons are those at Stonehenge and those found in the Megalithic Temples of Malta.

The word trilithon is derived from the Greek "having three stones" (tri - "three", lithos - "stone") and was first used by William Stukeley. The term also describes the groups of three stones in the Hunebed tombs of the Netherlands and the three massive stones forming part of the wall of the Temple of Jupiter at Baalbek, Lebanon.

== See also ==
- List of megalithic sites
- List of ancient monoliths
