= Carrigagulla =

Megalithic complex in Cork, Ireland

- Carraig an Ghiolla (Irish)
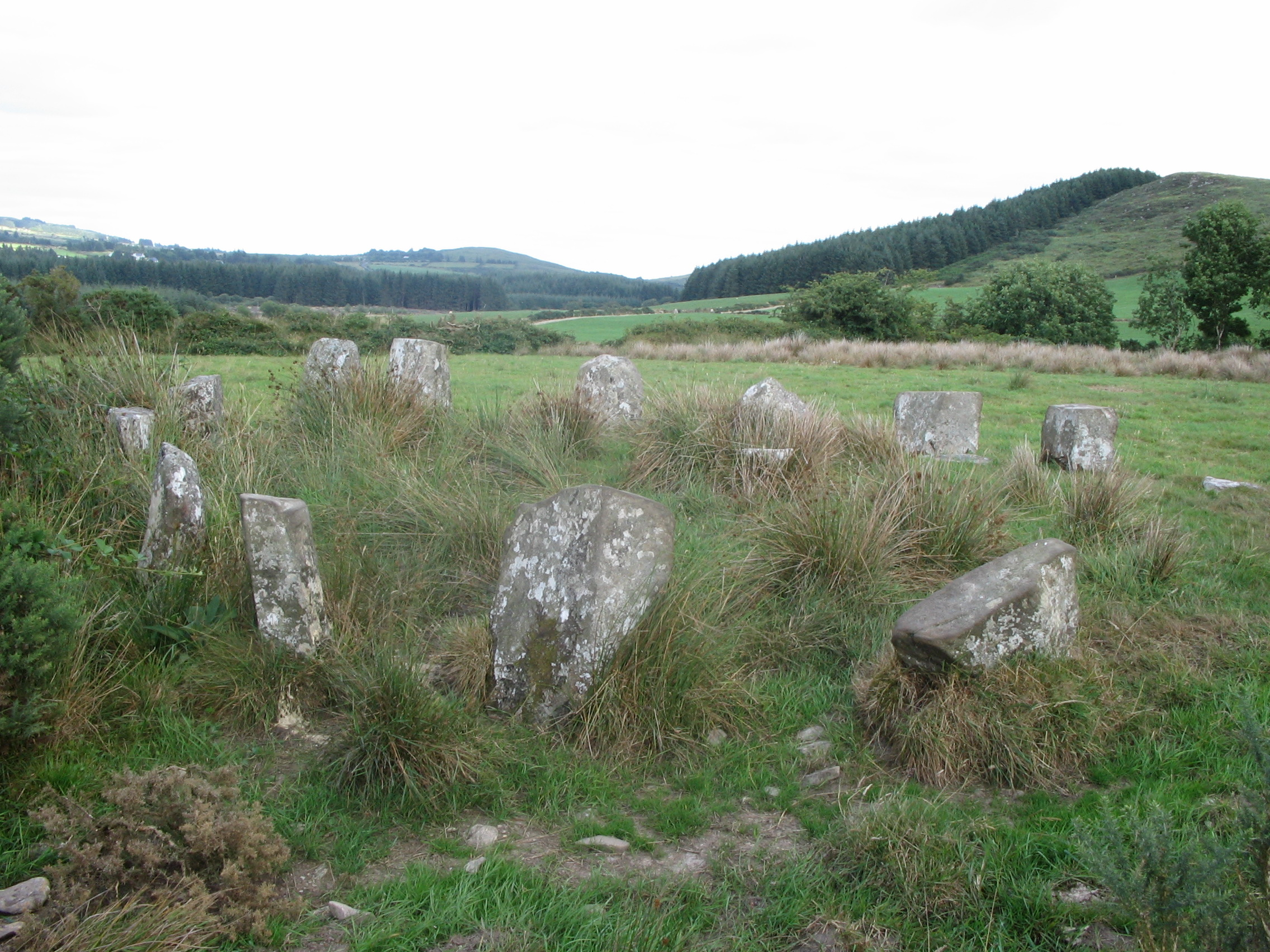
- Interactive map of Carrigagulla
- 52°00′02″N 8°54′59″W

National monument of Ireland
- Official name: Carrigagulla
- Reference no.: 660

Carrigagulla (Irish: Carraig an Ghiolla) is a megalithic complex 2.9 km north-east of Ballinagree, County Cork, Ireland.

It consists of an axial stone circle, two stone rows, and an ogham stone, which has been moved around a half mile away.

== Features ==
Carrigagulla A is an 8-metre-diameter (26 ft) stone circle consisting of 16 standing stones circling a central slab. It is thought that there originally may have been 17 stones with one more placed in the middle of the circle. The Carrigagulla NE stone row consists of five stones, four of which have been moved and are now used as gates. The stone row at Carrigagulla SW is built from three stones, one of which has fallen.

Carrigagulla Ogham Stone was discovered by Coillte Teoranta during peat cutting, but the exact location of the find is not known. It has been housed in Cork Public Museum since 1940.

== Sources ==
- Denis Power (1997). Archaeological inventory of County Cork, Volume 3: Mid Cork, 6435 P10. ColorBooks. ISBN 0-7076-4933-1
