= Axial stone circle =

Type of megalithic monument in counties Cork and Kerry, Ireland

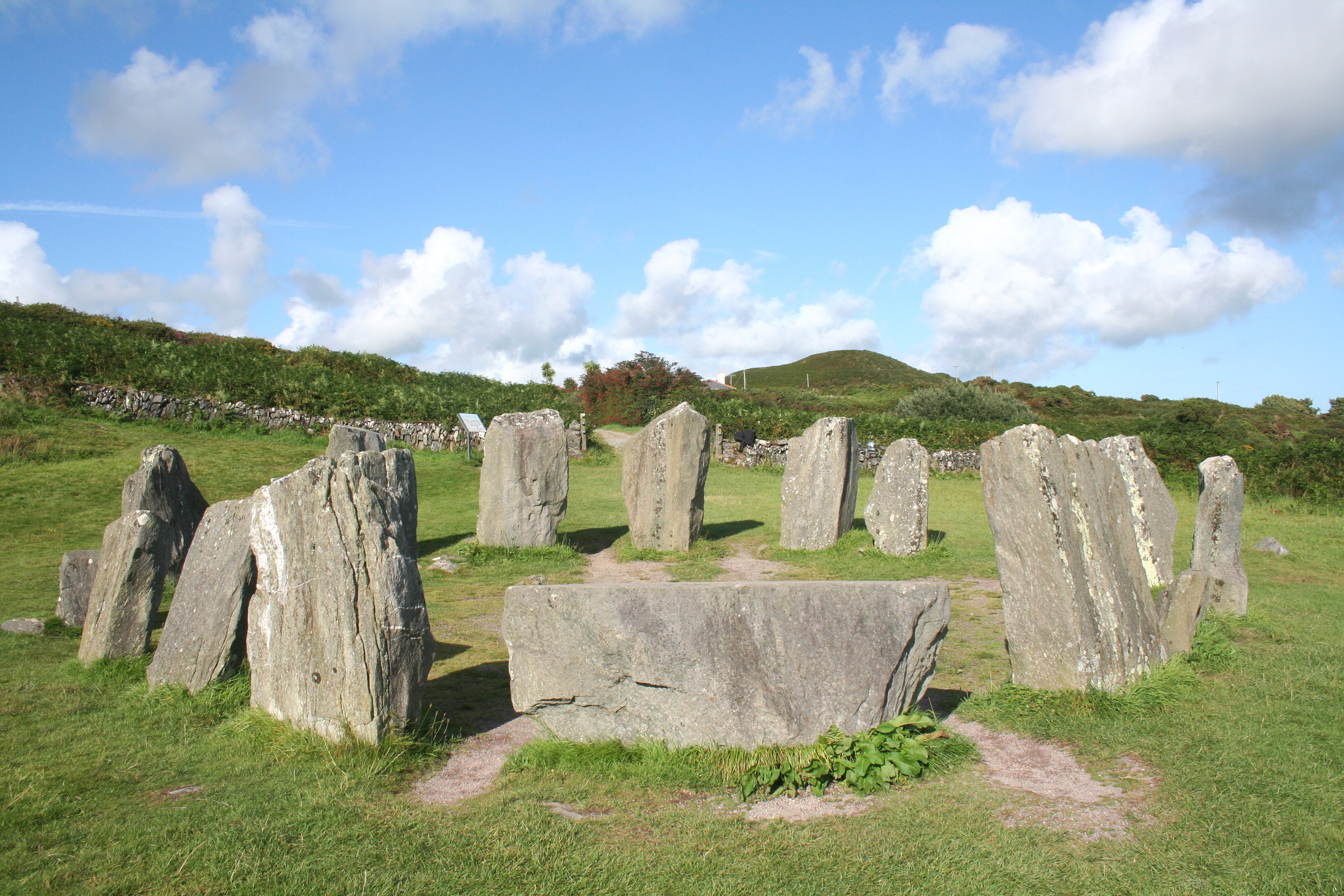
Drombeg multiple-stone circle seen by looking northeast over the axial stone

An axial stone circle is a megalithic ring of stones of a particular design found in County Cork and County Kerry in southwest Ireland. Archaeologists have found it convenient to consider the axial five-stone circle and axial multiple-stone circle separately. The circle has an approximate axis of symmetry aligned in a generally northeast–southwest direction. The stone at the southwest side of the circle, rather than being an upright orthostat like all the rest, is a slab lying horizontally with its long thin edge along the circumference of the ring. Because it marks the axis of the circle it is called the axial stone.

Constructed in the Bronze Age, axial stone circles have an odd number of stones with two stones placed on either side of where the axis crosses the northeast side of the ring. The pair of uprights is generally taller that any of the others and they frame what is sometimes regarded as the entrance, or portal, to the ring. For this reason these two stones are called portal stones.

Early in the 20th century this type of circle was called a recumbent stone circle by analogy with similar examples in Scotland but when it became clear there were substantial differences the term Cork–Kerry stone circle was adopted and later the term "axial stone circle" became used as a synonym. Ó Nualláin (1984) has published a comprehensive survey.

Drombeg stone circle has been excavated and has been particularly well studied. When an observer looks southwest along its axis the midwinter sun can be seen to set behind a notch on the skyline directly over the axial stone. However, no other axial circles have a comparable characteristic and statistical analysis over the circles as a whole show their alignments do not point accurately to any significant rising or setting positions of sun, moon or major stars.

== Axial stone circles in counties Cork and Kerry ==
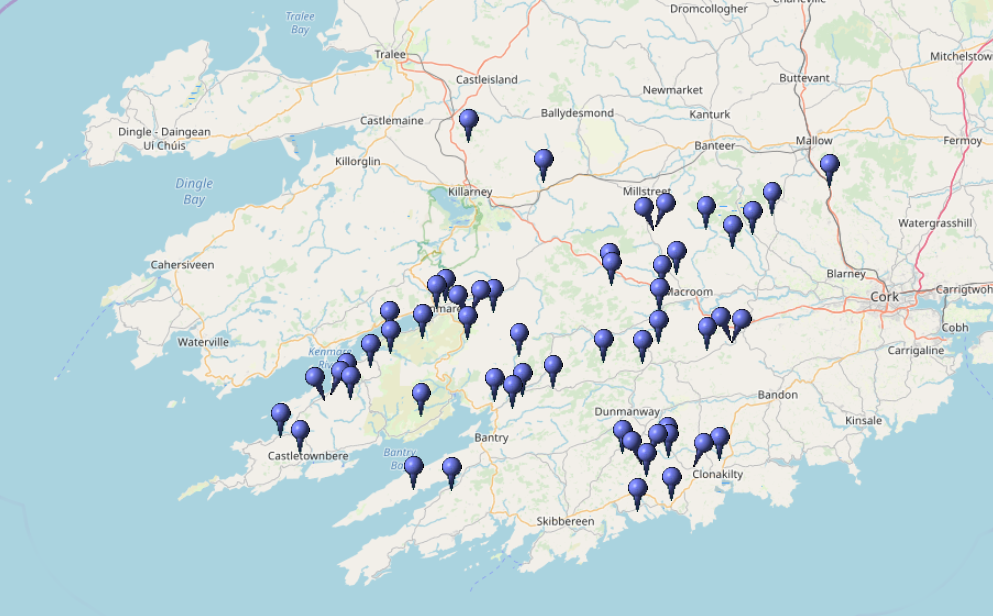
OpenStreetMap display of multiple-stone circle locations in Cork and Kerry

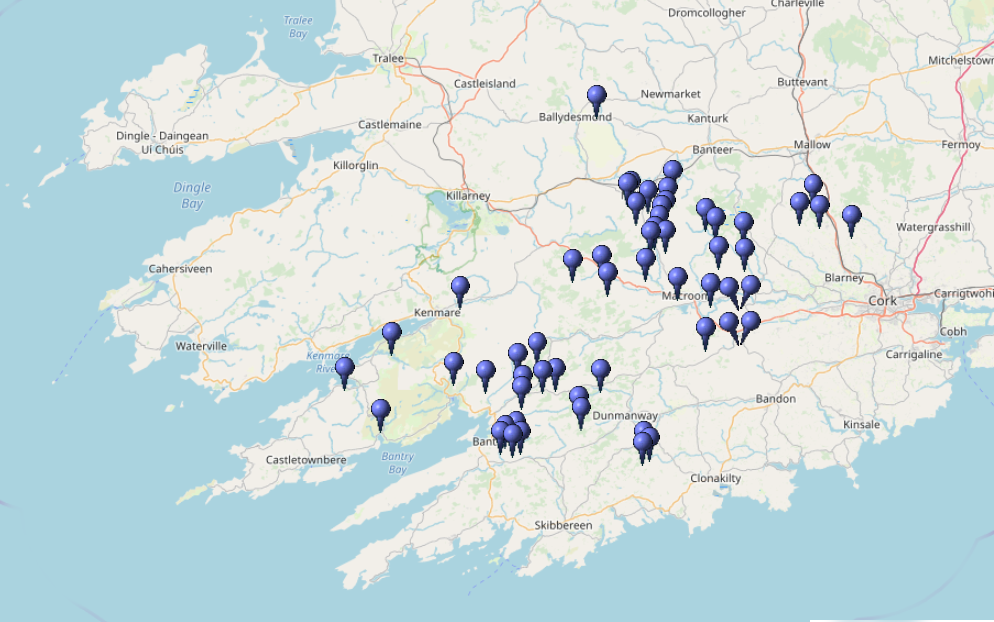
OpenStreetMap display of five-stone circle locations in Cork and Kerry

There are 56 multiple-stone circles and 56 five-stone circles in counties Cork and Kerry combined. The locations can be displayed dynamically via the OpenStreetMap viewer (there is an additional multiple-stone circle in County Clare). Ireland's National Monuments Service, part of the Department of Culture, Heritage and the Gaeltacht, operates a database that includes archaeology sites. List of axial multiple-stone circles lists the sites classified as "stone circle – multiple-stone" and likewise List of axial five-stone circles for "stone circle – five-stone".

== Developments in characterising the structures ==
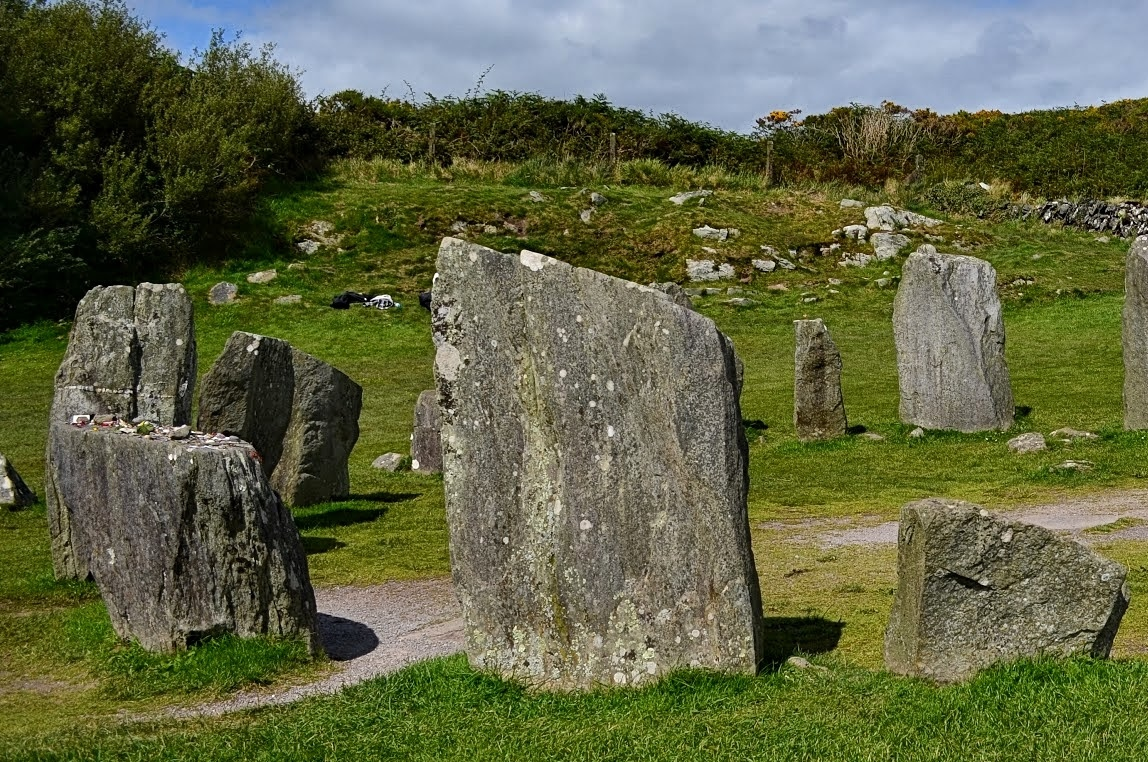
Ireland: Multiple-stone circle at Drombeg (axial is low stone on left)

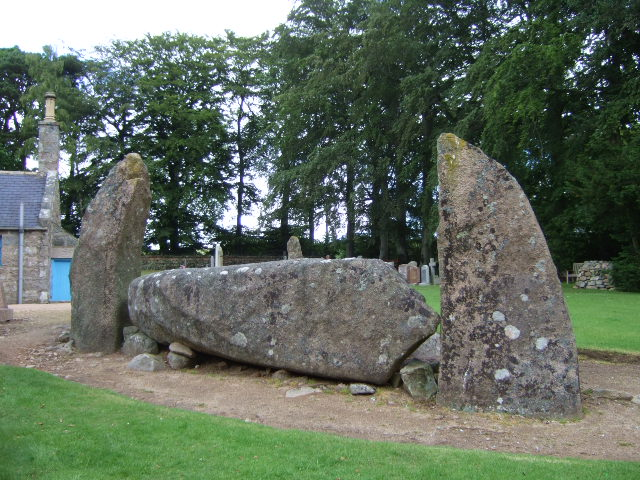
Scotland: Recumbent and flanker stones at Midmar Kirk recumbent stone circle

Somerville (1909) first reported that the axis of Drombeg stone circle aligned with the setting of the sun at midwinter over the axial stone. He noted this stone had been deliberately laid in an orientation along its long edge and it had not merely fallen like this. He called the structure a recumbent stone circle because of a perceived similarity with stone circles in northeast Scotland which by that time had been carefully surveyed by Frederick Coles. The similarities are that the recumbent stone lies lengthways along the southwest circumference of the circle and there are two orthostats (upright stones) taller than the rest. In Scotland the recumbent stone (Note: The word "recumbent" had long been used simply to describe stones that had fallen over but John Stuart, writing in 1856, credits Charles Dalrymple and Andrew Jervise with descriptions of stone circles including a "recumbent stone" where it is clear the description was of a stone placed deliberately.) is a massive block and the two tallest stones, "flankers", stand at each end of it. In Ireland, however, the recumbent stone is a somewhat thin slab, quite modest in size, and Ó Nualláin regarded it as lying "upright". In Ireland the tall orthostats lie opposite to the recumbent stone and not beside it, so, seeking a name to differentiate the Irish stone circles, Ó Nualláin called them "Cork–Kerry stone circles" and the stone to the southwest he called the "axial stone".

Ó Nualláin studied 88 circles with axial stones and recognised two different types according to the number of stones in the ring. Forty-three circles had five stones ("five-stone circles") and forty-five had seven or more stones ("multiple-stone circles"). The latter have up to nineteen stones but they mostly have nine, eleven or thirteen. Those with multiple stones bear a greater similarity to the recumbent stone circles of Scotland.

== Design and archaeology of axial and recumbent stone circles ==
Axial (or Cork–Kerry) stone circles were constructed in the middle to late Bronze Age (1500 BC - 800 BC) with the multiple-stone circles coming in the earlier part of this period. To give some context, copper mining started in Kerry as early as 2400 BC – portal tombs and wedge tombs were even earlier.

It is probable the design in southwest Ireland developed from that of the recumbent stone circles in northeast Scotland which were being constructed from about 2500 BC to 1000 BC. The main points of similarity are that one stone (the recumbent/axial) lies horizontally along the circumference of the circle at the southwest side so that an imaginary line through the centre of the circle and over the centre of the recumbent points generally southwest, between extremes of 186° and 293°. Quartz pebbles were often scattered beside and even underneath some stones. Cup marks are sometimes found, generally near the axial stone.

=== Features specific to the Scottish recumbent stone circles ===
The Scottish circles are arranged so their two tallest uprights (flankers) are on either side of a massive recumbent that weighs up to 30–40 short tons (27–36 t), far bigger than any of the other stones. The circle may have any number of stones (odd or even) between 9 and 18 (typically 11 or 12) with those further from the recumbent becoming progressively less tall. Generally there was a central ring cairn.

The line over the axial stone points southwest and there are some indications that the actual direction depended on topographic or astronomical features, particularly the moon. Sites seem to have been chosen so the horizon in this direction is nearly always distant and does not block the view.

=== Features specific to the Irish axial stone circles ===
Drombeg multiple-stone circle

Kealkill five-stone circle and associated stones

The two tallest uprights are on the opposite side of the ring from the axial stone so the imaginary axial line passes through the space between them. Because this has been seen as an entrance to the ring it was called the portal and the stones on either side became known as portal stones. Axial stone circles always have an odd number of stones (between 5 and 19) so there is always a space opposite the axial stone. The portal stones are usually the tallest and the ones adjacent to the axial stone are shorter. The axial stone is usually quite a thin slab, set upright on its thin edge with its long axis along the circumference. The heaviest (at Derreentaggart) weighs about 4 tonnes (3.9 long tons; 4.4 short tons). The length of the axial may be less than the width of an upright – the important thing about an axial stone is its low height rather than its long length. Even at the impressive Drombeg the axial is only 1 by 2.1 by .46 metres (3 ft 3 in × 6 ft 11 in × 1 ft 6 in) (height x length x thickness).

The axial stone indicates a direction between south and west but otherwise does not seem to align strongly in any particular way. There may be hilly ground blocking the view behind the axial stone.

==== Multiple-stone circles ====
Multiple-stone circles and Scottish recumbent circles have roughly the same diameter though the Scottish rings are generally larger – 15–25 metres (49–82 ft) against typically 8.5–9.5 metres (28–31 ft). Some of the Irish rings have a central stone but none of the Scottish rings are like this. If there is an associated cairn it is outside the circle, not within it. Four circles have been adequately excavated: Bohonagh, Cashelkeelty, Reannascreena and Drombeg. They all contained central pits with cremated human bone but there were few artefacts and dating proved very variable.

==== Five-stone circles ====
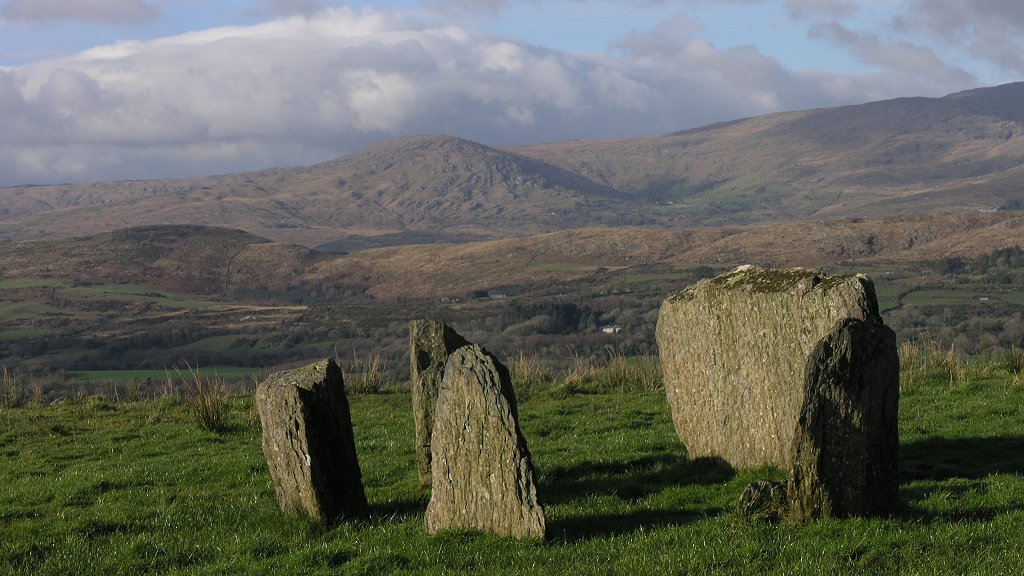
Kealkill five-stone circle (axial stone on left)

Five-stone circles are small in size – the diameter may be only 2.5 metres (8 ft 2 in) – and they are somewhat elliptical being greater in length along the axis that across it. The recumbent effectively makes the ring a D shape rather than a circle. The grading in height is observed strictly from tall portal stones to a low axial. There is no central stone or cairn but associated cairns and menhirs in the vicinity are very common. These circles, unlike their larger cousins, tend to be clustered so they are visible from each other. Two five-stone circles have been excavated – Cashelkeelty (where there is also a multiple-stone circle) and Kealkill. The size of the five-stone circles is such that any sighting along the axis could not be precise and cannot be useful for astronomical purposes. Whereas multiple-stone circles tend to be located in low, coastal areas, five-stones are found on higher ground inland.

When Kealkill five-stone circle was first excavated it was assumed that the large stone at the north (right of photograph) was the axial stone but it is now thought to be a portal stone and the axial is the rather insignificant one at the southwest (left of ring in photograph).

== Significance of axis ==
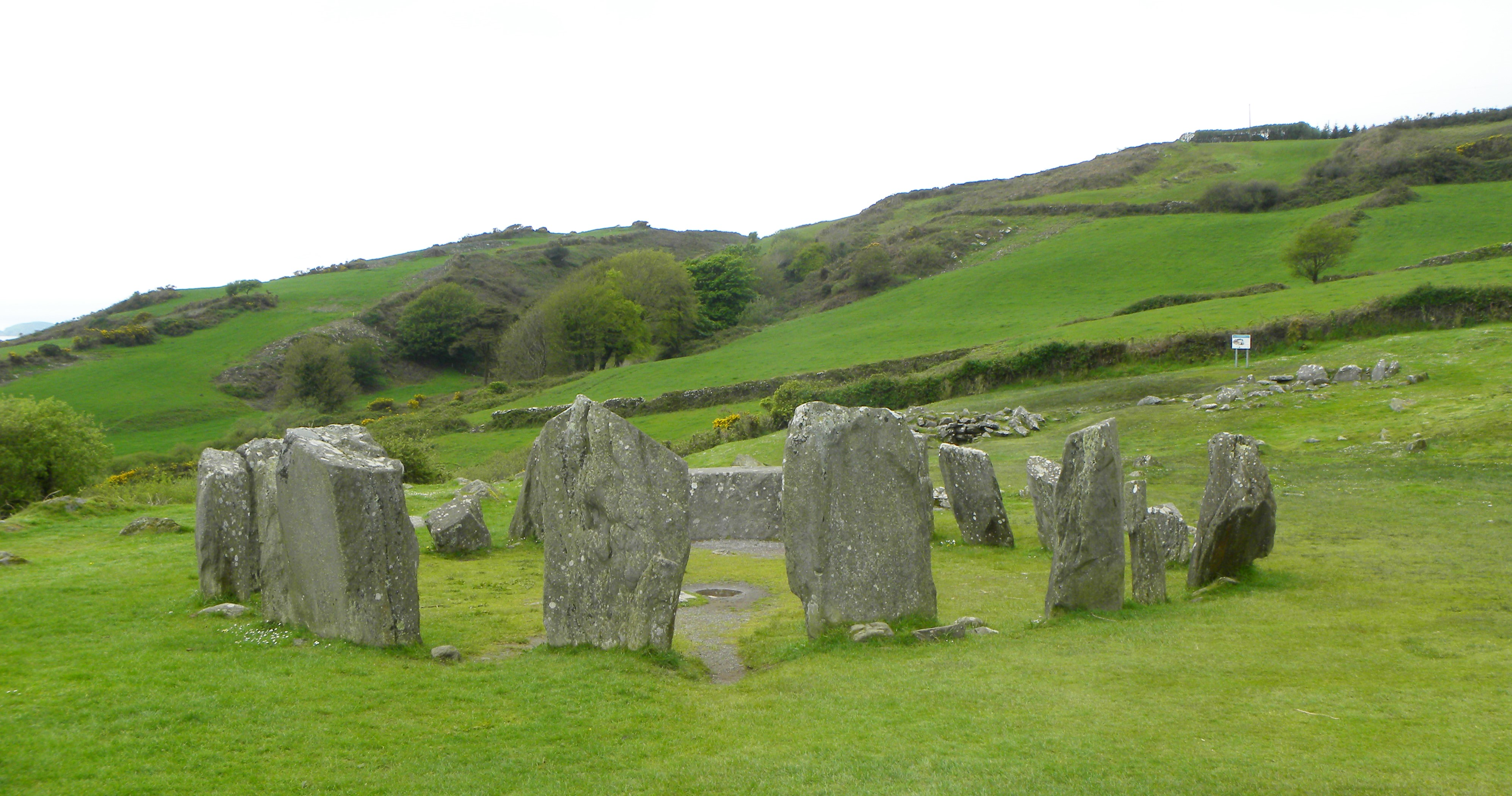
Drombeg multiple-stone circle looking between the portal stones towards the axial stone

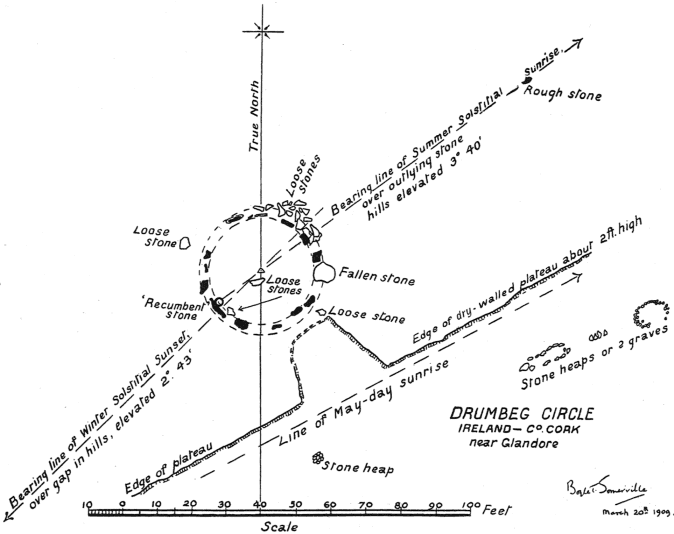
Somerville's 1909 sketch of Drombeg alignments

The astronomer Sir Norman Lockyer, studying Stonehenge in 1906, suggested that the alignment of the stones in a stone circle sometimes had astronomical significance. When observing sunrise or sunset Lockyer understood that not only is the apparent movement of the sun across the sky relevant (which depends on the latitude of the observer and the time of year (Note: For the sun there is a change over a period of some 41,000 years due to the obliquity of the ecliptic by which Lockyer purported to date Stonehenge to 1680 BC. For the moon there is a change over a period of about 18.6 years due to lunar precession (see lunar standstill) and for stars general precession produces a change over about 26,000 years)) but the altitude (Note: By altitude here is meant the angle of the point on the horizon vertically above an exactly horizontal line.) of the horizon at the point of sunrise or sunset also matters.

In 1909 Somerville applied this idea to Drombeg stone circle in County Cork (which he called a recumbent stone circle). It was the only such circle he was aware of outside Aberdeenshire in northeast Scotland and he found the similarity to be remarkable considering how far apart the places were. He discovered two main alignments by looking along the axis in both directions. Looking towards the southwest across the diameter of the circle and passing centrally over the axial stone Somerville observed a "very conspicuous notch in the hills distant about a mile" at the point at which the sun set at the midwinter solstice. (Note: The southwest skyline in shown in the photograph in this article and Somerville also provided a photograph of the scene. Aubrey Burl commented that the alignment was good but not precise.) The other alignment is from the axial stone, over the taller portal stone to an outlying broken stone and on to a point on the crest of a hill at the spot where the sun rises at the summer solstice. Somerville had been investigating alignments from the centre of the ring (as had been done by Lockyer) as well as along the axis and from the ring to distant natural features on the horizon.

== Astronomical significance of axial alignment ==
Because of the multiplicity of stones and hence possible alignments, for most stone circles it is difficult or impossible to draw statistically sound conclusions about whether astronomical alignments had been intended and whether celestial predictions could have been made. However, for axial stone circles, by limiting consideration to alignments along the axis, the matter becomes tractable when a group of such circles is treated statistically overall. Barber (1973) discussed the concept of "axis of symmetry" and, after adopting objective criteria for how accurately the azimuth of an axis could be measured and by considering a priori specific solar and lunar situations for rising and setting, he found that 12 out of 30 axial stone circle sites showed acceptable alignments – a statistically significant result. However, later authors found errors in the paper and, with the results recalculated, no significant relationship was found. Barber found no significant result for stellar orientations. The long length of the axial stones means they would not have provided an accurate angle for someone looking along an axial line somewhere above the stone. Surveys have therefore looked either at the edges of the stone or at its centre point. Alternatively, the stone has been used to indicate a region of interest along the horizon within which to look for landscape features which align with astronomical events.

Ruggles (1984) and Ruggles & Burl (1985) studied as a group the recumbent stone circles of northeast Scotland and found strong patterns of NE–SW alignment of a somewhat indefinite nature for the moon's rising and setting, particularly in relation to the Moon's major or minor standstill. Alignments were towards the most prominent hilltop seen somewhere over the recumbent from the axial line and also towards the eastern end of the recumbent, again from the axial line. So as to test these findings on a new set of data Ruggles examined the Cork–Kerry axial stone circles. However, for the Irish circles the axes of the circles do not, in general, point to prominent hill tops nor do they have an alignment with particular occasions for the rising or setting of the sun or moon. (Note: For the Scottish circles Ruggles & Burl (1985) found that alignments of cup marks gave the strongest suggestion of lunar alignment, but there are few cup marks on the axial stone circles in Ireland. However, Drombeg's axial stone is cup marked.) Concerning the solstice alignment at Drombeg stone circle Clive Ruggles reported in 2002 that, following statistical analysis covering axial stone circles as a group, it was the only axial stone circle having a solar alignment of this nature and this alignment might be a matter of chance. He considered that archaeoastronomy should be regarded as an aspect of anthropology which helps us in studying ancient people's ways of thinking. It is improbable the circles were a stage in the development of modern astronomical observatories. The axes of the circles are certainly not random: they are almost all aligned between west and south – but further precision and understanding remains elusive.

== See also ==
- List of megalithic monuments in Cork
- List of National Monuments in County Kerry
- List of stone circles § Republic of Ireland
