= Stones of Scotland =

Cultural and historically significant stones

Many large stones of Scotland are noted for their cultural and historical significance, such as the distinctive Pictish stones.

== Stone of Scone ==
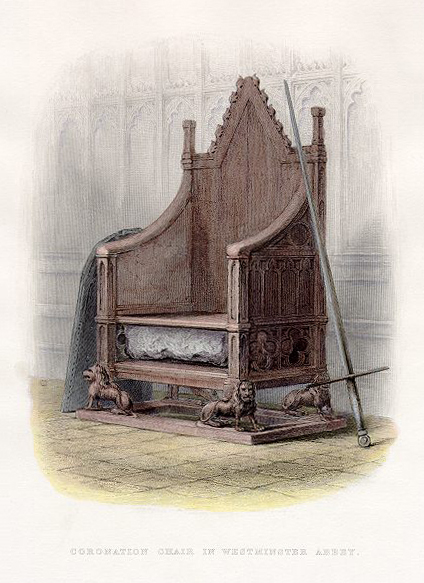
The Stone of Scone in the Coronation Chair at Westminster Abbey, 1859

The Stone of Scone (/ˈskuːn/; Scottish Gaelic: An Lia Fàil, meaning Stone of Destiny, also called clach-na-cinneamhuinn; Scots: Stane o Scone) is an oblong block of red sandstone that was used in the coronation of Scottish monarchs until the 13th century when it was seized by Edward I during the First War of Scottish Independence and taken to England. Thereafter, it was used in the coronation of English and later British monarchs.

It is considered an ancient symbol of the Scottish monarchy and the Kingdom of Scotland, with its first recorded use being in 1249 for the coronation of Alexander III of Scotland. The Stone measures 26 by 16 3/4 by 10 1/2 inches (66 cm × 43 cm × 27 cm) and weighs approximately 336 lb (152 kg; 24 st). A cross is roughly incised on one surface, and an iron ring at each end aids with transport. Monarchs sat on the Stone of Scone itself, until a wooden platform was added to the Coronation Chair in the 17th century.

The artefact was originally kept at the Scone Abbey, now ruined, in Scone, near Perth. In 1296, the forces of Edward I of England captured it during Edward's invasion of Scotland. The Stone has been used in the coronation of English and British monarchs for over 500 years. In 1996, the stone was returned to Scotland, and kept in Edinburgh Castle with the Honours of Scotland. The stone remains property of the Crown, with Crown Estate Scotland, an executive agency of the Scottish Government responsible for the stone in the rights of the monarch. It is transported to London for use at coronations under the supervision of the Keeper of the Great Seal of Scotland. Since March 2024, it has been on permanent public display in Perth Museum, Perth, Scotland.

== Rocking stones ==
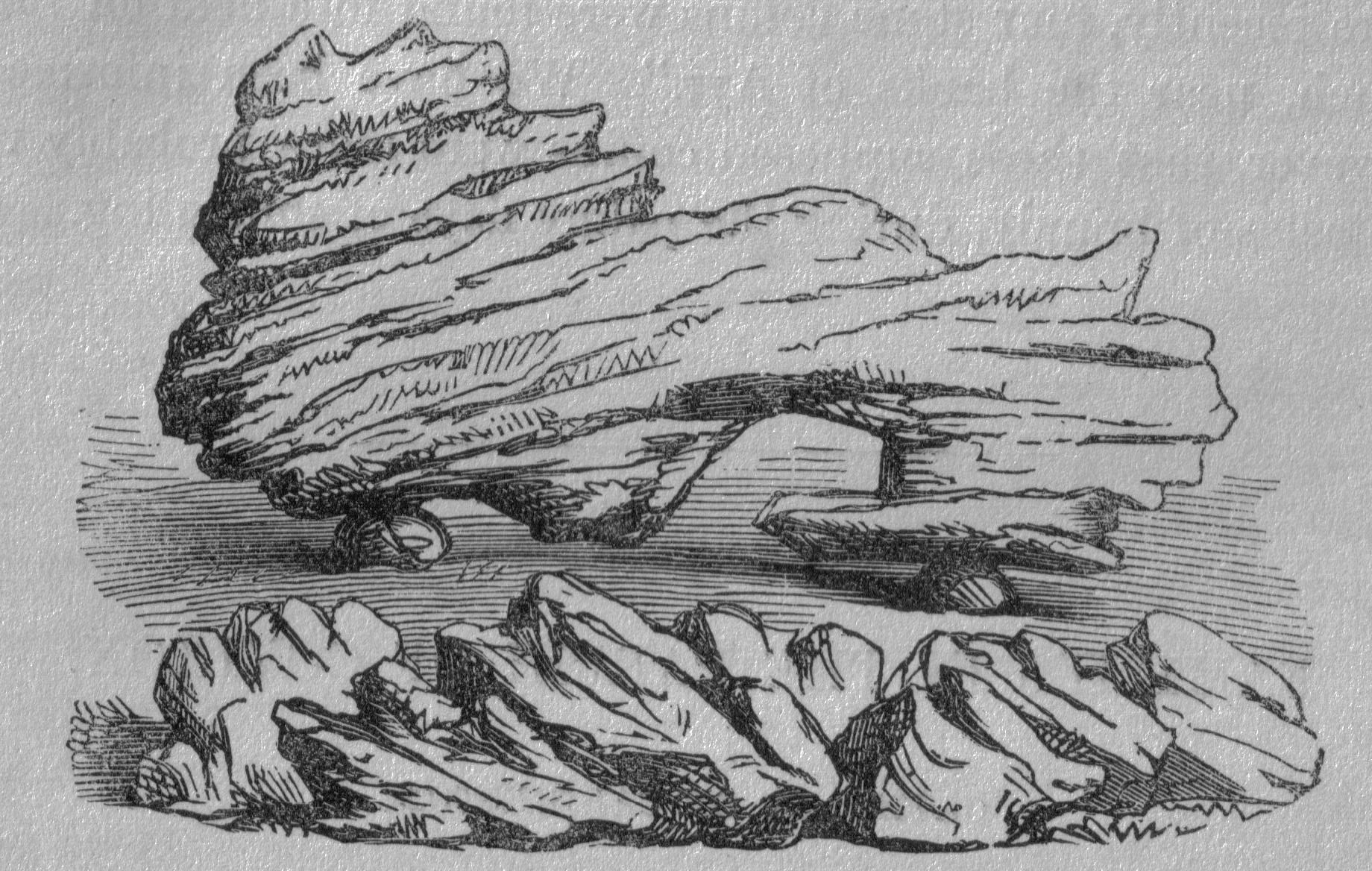
The Coylton rocking stone (1863).

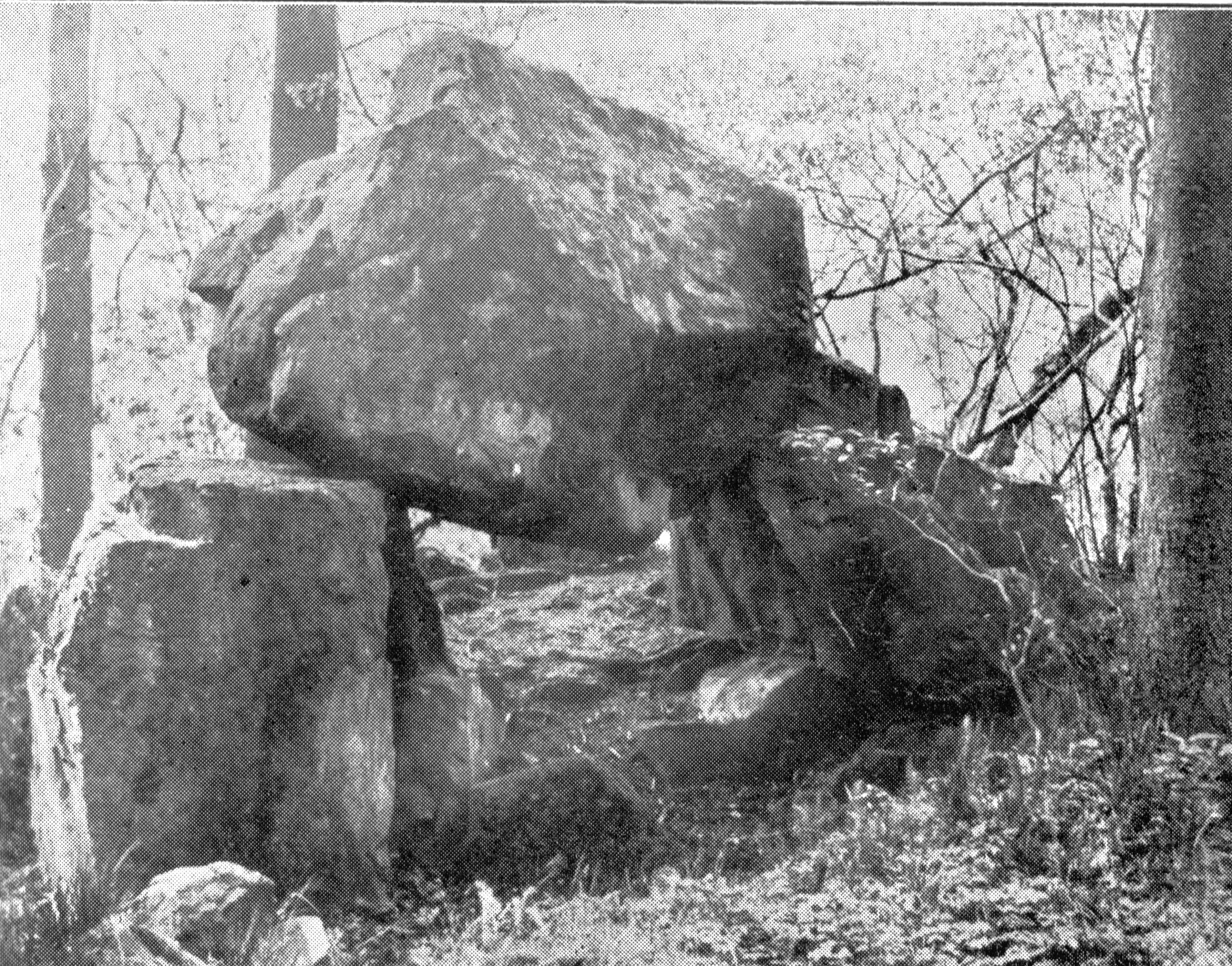
The Lugar rocking stone.

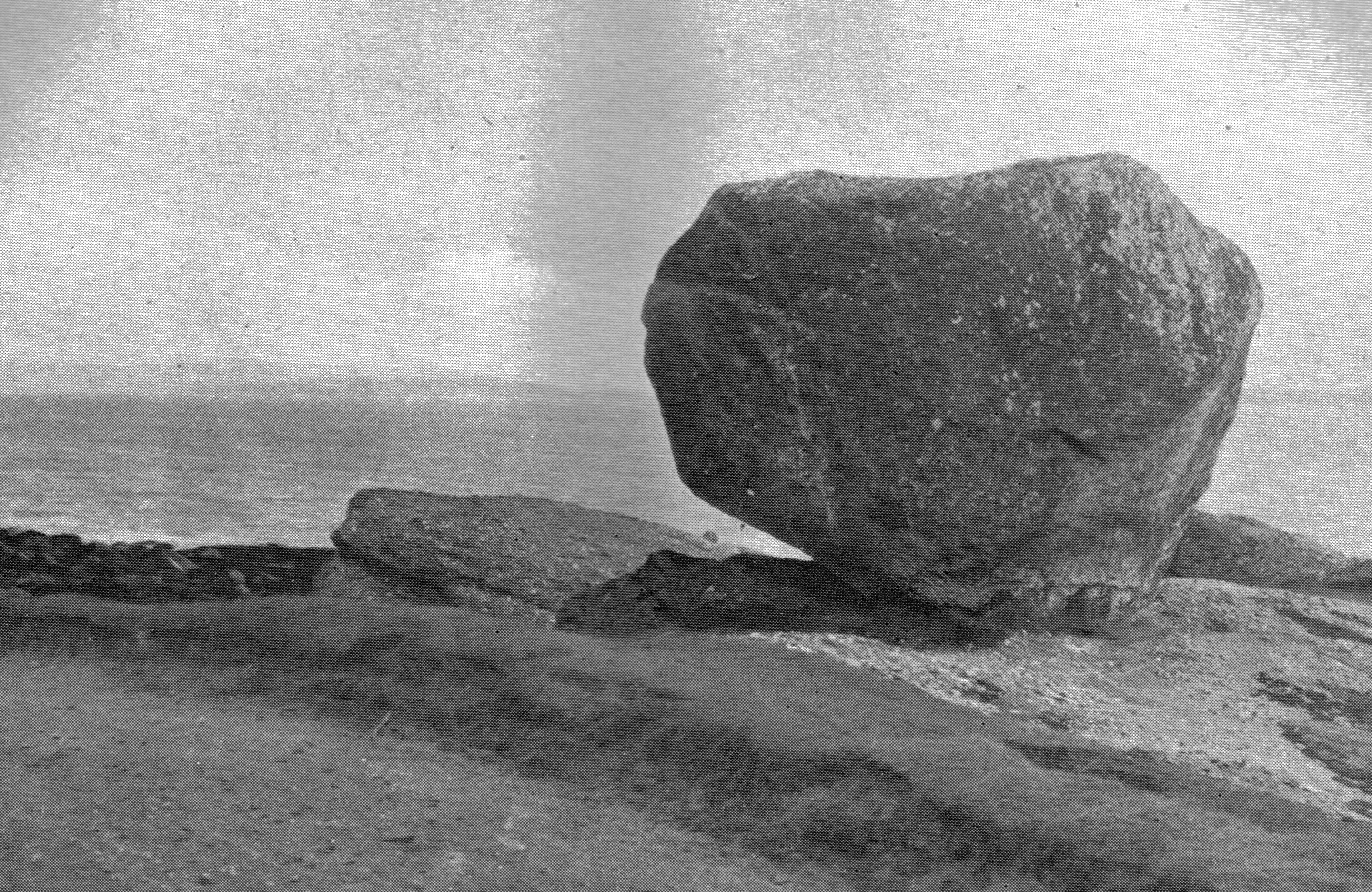
The Sannox rocking stone.

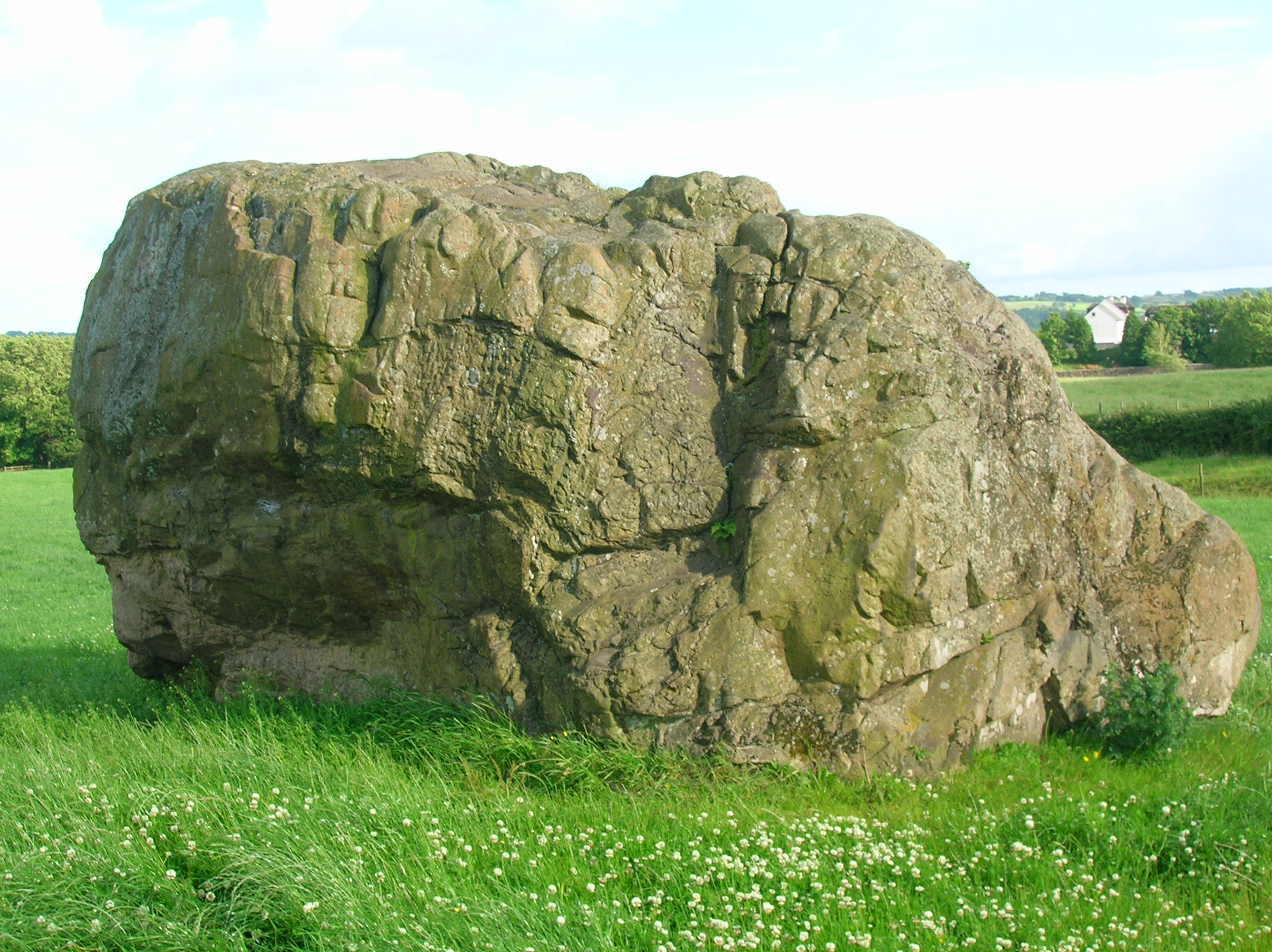
The Clochoderick Rocking stone.

Ayrshire has a number of rocking stones.

One rocking stone is recorded near the site of Saint Bride's Chapel. This stone stands on top of the Craigs of Kyle near Coylton in Ayrshire. It weighs around 30 tons and rest upon two stones. A large standing stone known as Wallace's stone stands nearby.

A rocking stone is near Loch Riecawr in South Ayrshire.

The parish of North Carrick in the Straiton District in South Ayrshire, about a quarter of a mile (400 m) to the west of the White Laise, and near the March Dyke, has a rocking stone named the Logan Stone, which is a grey granite rock that rests on greywacke. It can easily be moved with one hand. It is 4 feet 3 inches by 4 feet, by 3 feet high (1.3 × 1.2 × 0.9 m).

A rocking stone that some associate with the Druids is on Cuff Hill in Hessilhead, near Beith in North Ayrshire. It no longer rocks, due to people digging beneath to ascertain its fulcrum. It is in a small wood and surrounded by a circular drystone wall.

The Lamagee or Lamargle stone is in the centre of a stone circle in the village of Lugar in East Ayrshire. The Lamargle stone rests on two stones. Local legend has it that the Lamargle stone used to rock, but it no longer does.

Near Lugar in the parish of Auchinleck in Ayrshire is a rocking stone in a hollow by the Bella Water near its junction with the Glenmore Water. It is made of two vertical stones, and a horizontal stone about six feet long, three feet broad and four feet high (1.8 × 0.9 × 1.2 m). It was regarded as a Druidical monument or the grave of a Caledonian hero.

In 1913–19, a rocking stone was at Sannox on the Isle of Arran. It sat on a nearly horizontal platform next to the seashore.

The Clochoderick stone near Howwood and Kilbarchan in Renfrewshire used to rock, and it is said that the druids used it to judge people. The accused was made to sit on the stone and by the way it moved the druids judged their innocence or guilt. It is also said to be the burial place of Rhydderch Hael, King of Strathclyde who won the Battle of Arfderydd (or Arderydd) near Arthuret in the Borders. His victory brought Christianity to Strathclyde.

=== Views of the Cuff Hill rocking stone ===
This stone could still, with a little effort, be rocked in the 1860s, according to the historian John Smith.

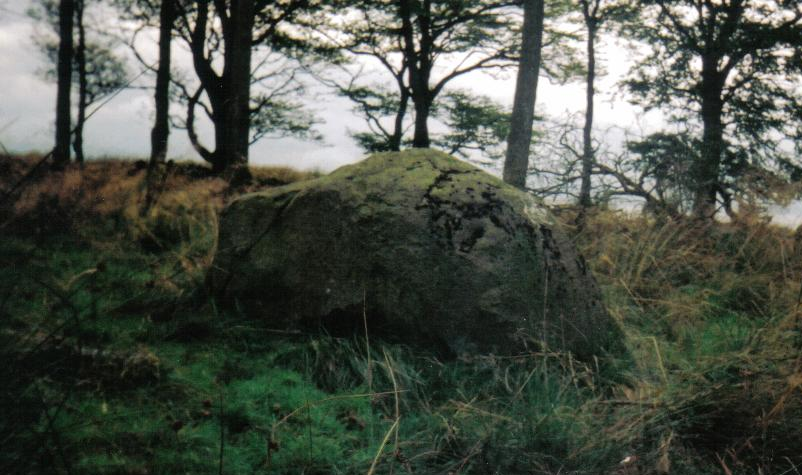
The Rocking Stone at Cuff Hill in Ayrshire.

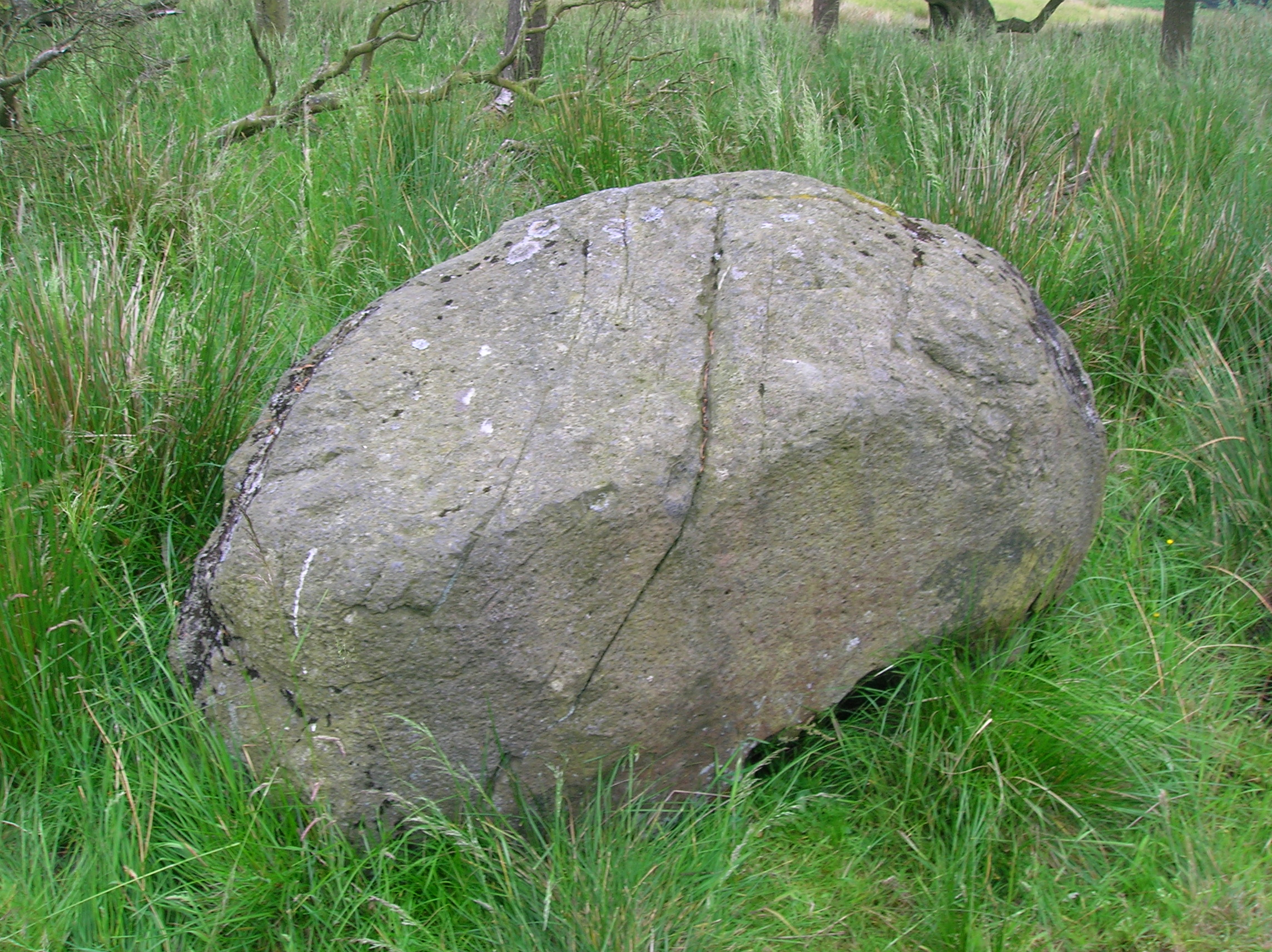
Detail of the rocking stone.

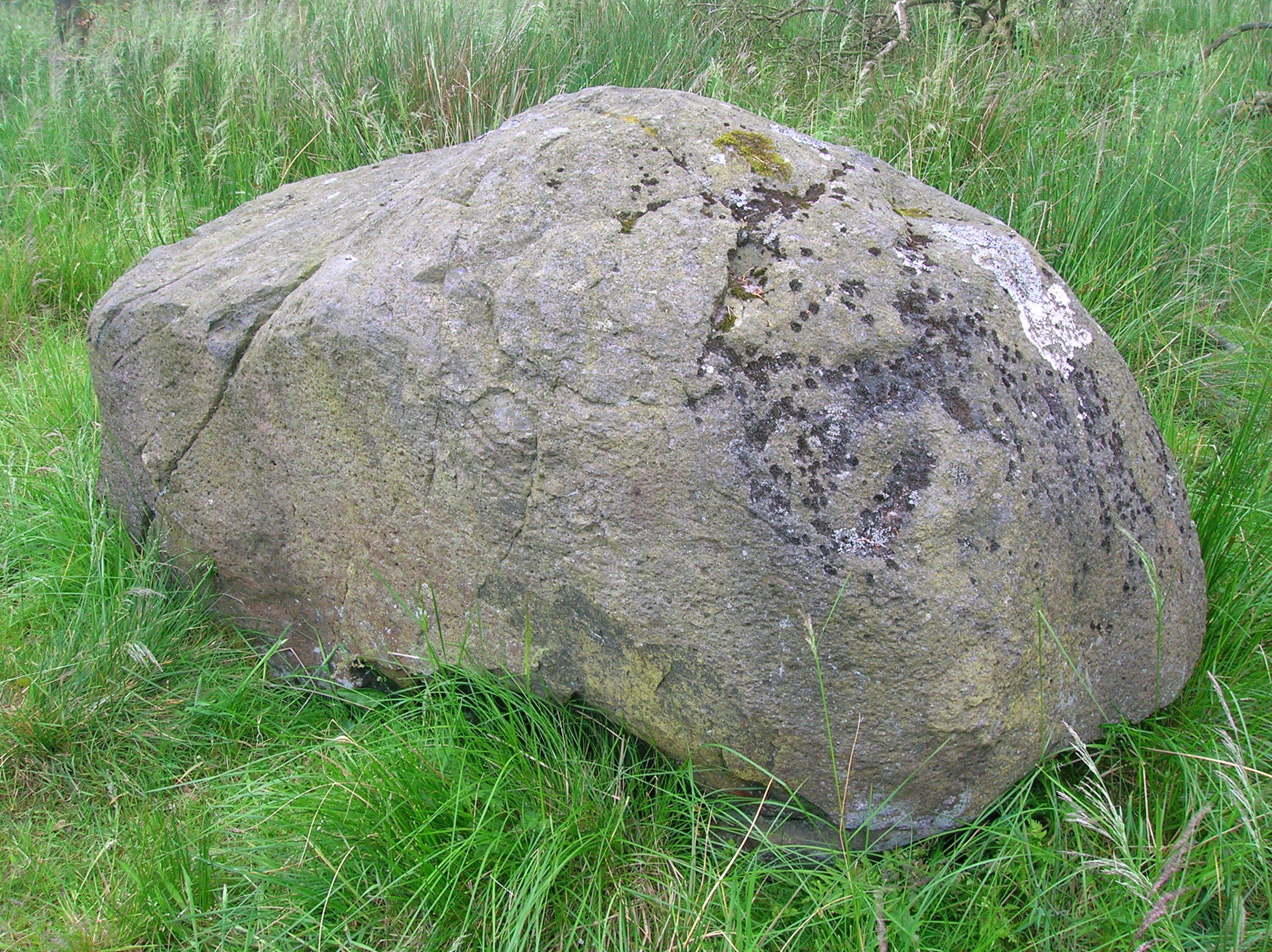
A different side.

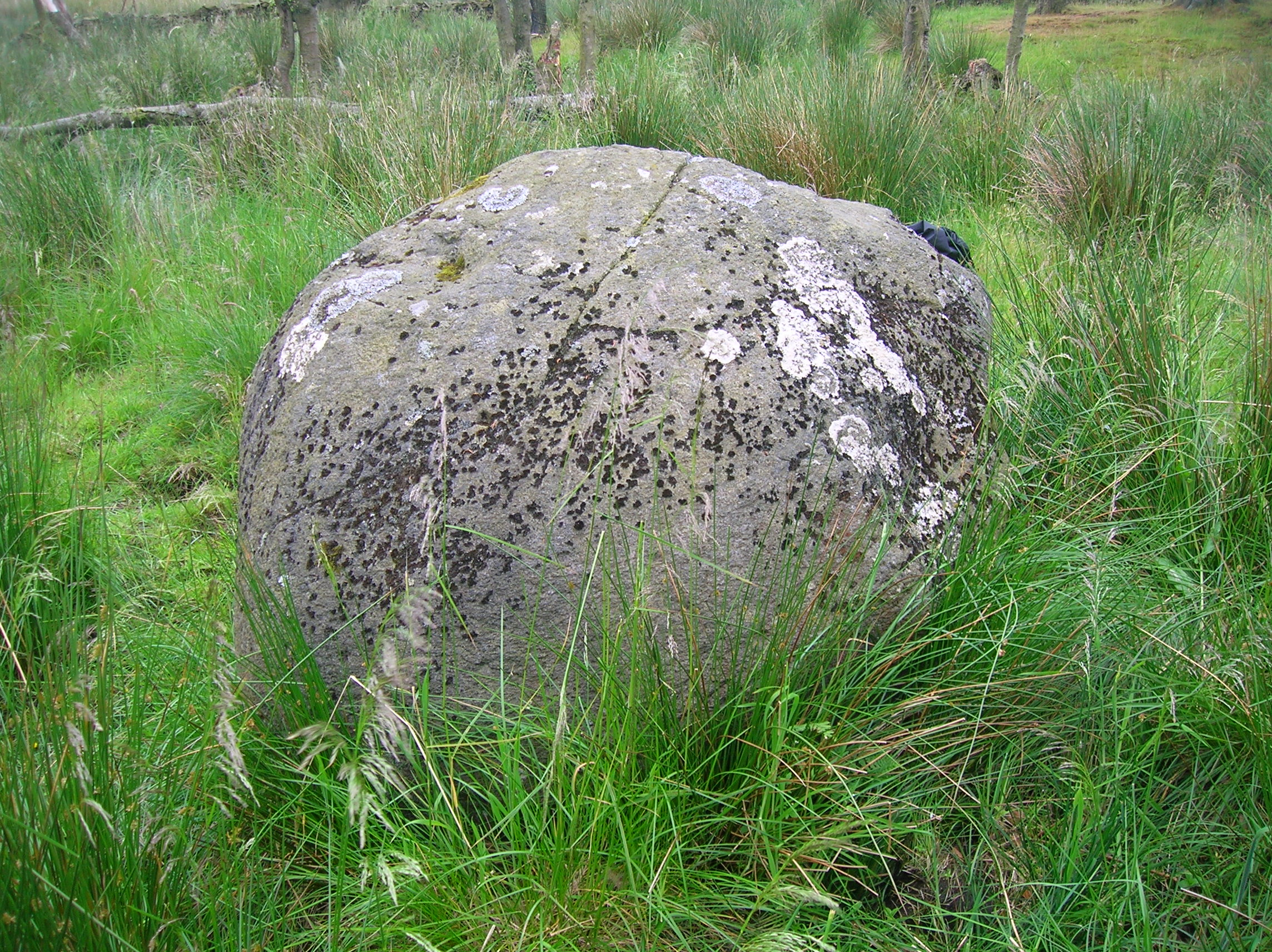
The third side.

== Lochmaben stone ==
The Lochmaben Stone (grid reference NY 3123 6600) is a megalith on the shore of the Solway Firth in Dumfries and Galloway, Scotland. It lies by the mouth of the Kirtle Water, near the town of Gretna. Together with a smaller stone, it is all that is left of a stone circle that was built around 3275 BC.

The principal stone or megalith has, in the Borders context, an unsurpassed extent of history attached to it. It is an erratic stone that is 7 feet (2.1 m) tall and 18 feet (5.5 m) in girth, and it weighs approximately 10 long tons (10,000 kg). It is composed of weathered granite, exposed to severe glacial action.

In these treeless flatlands this stone, given its size, would have been a distinctive landmark on the flat Solway Plain for several millennia.

== Thurgartstone ==
The Ogrestone or Thurgartstone near Dunlop in East Ayrshire is thought to have been a rocking stone. However, soil has built up around the base of the Thurgatstone over the years, which now prevents any rocking motion.

The Thurgatstane / Thorgatstane / Field Spirit Stane / Ogrestane near Dunlop in East Ayrshire is a glacial erratic stone near the middle of a field belonging to Brandleside Farm near to the site of St.Mary's Chapel on the Lugton road.

=== Views of the Thurgartstone in 2007 ===
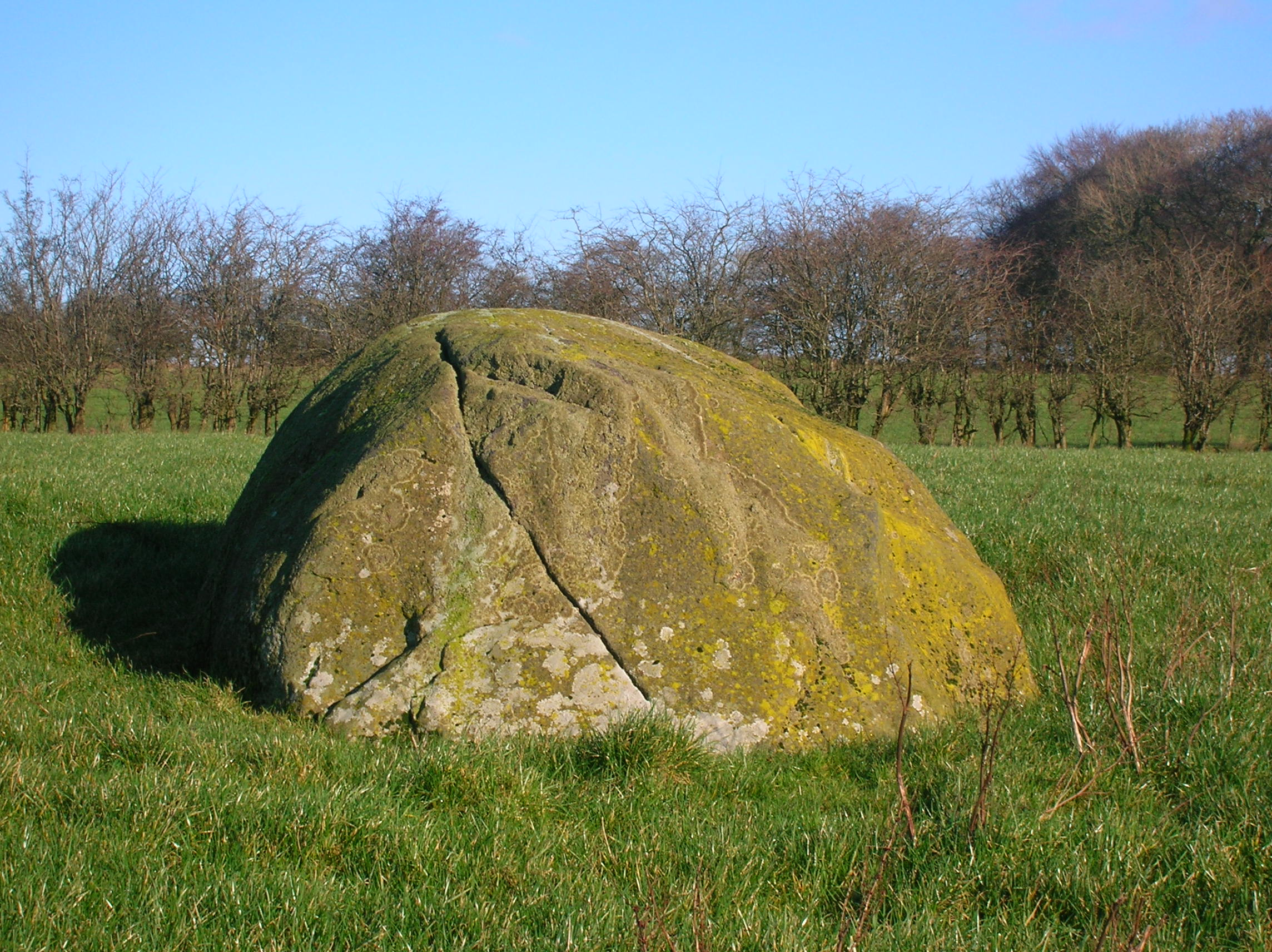
North Side

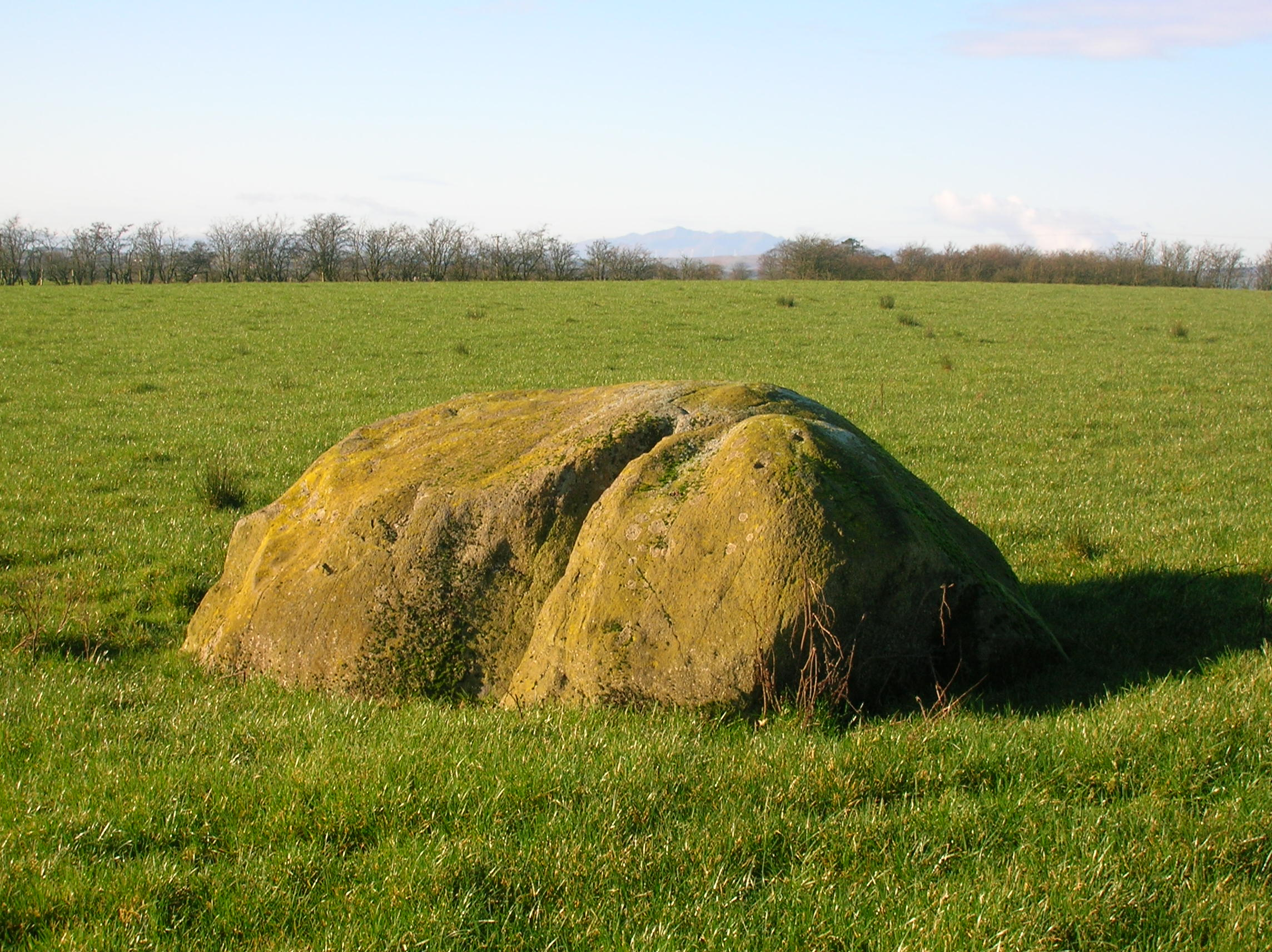
East Side

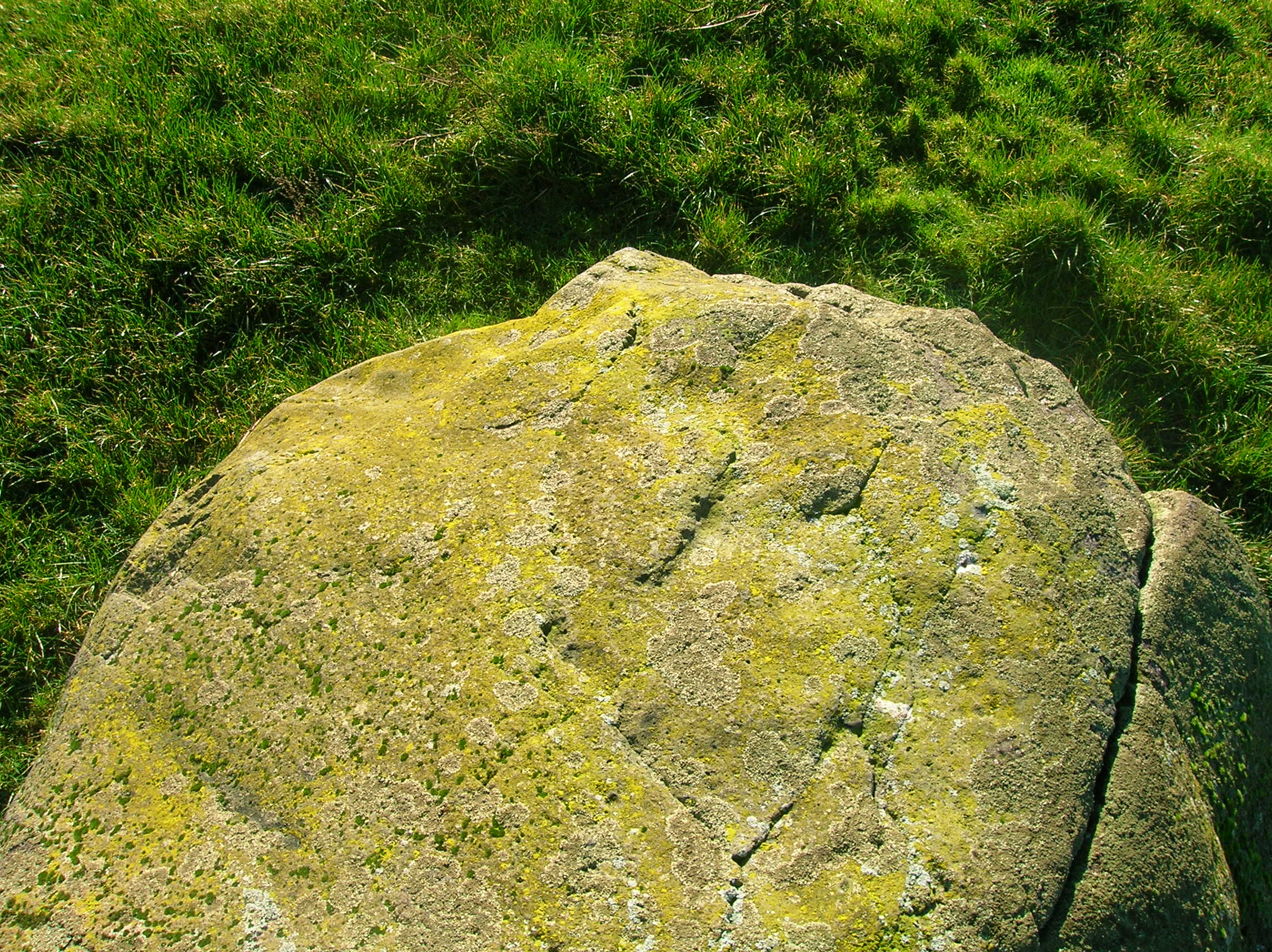
Viewed from above

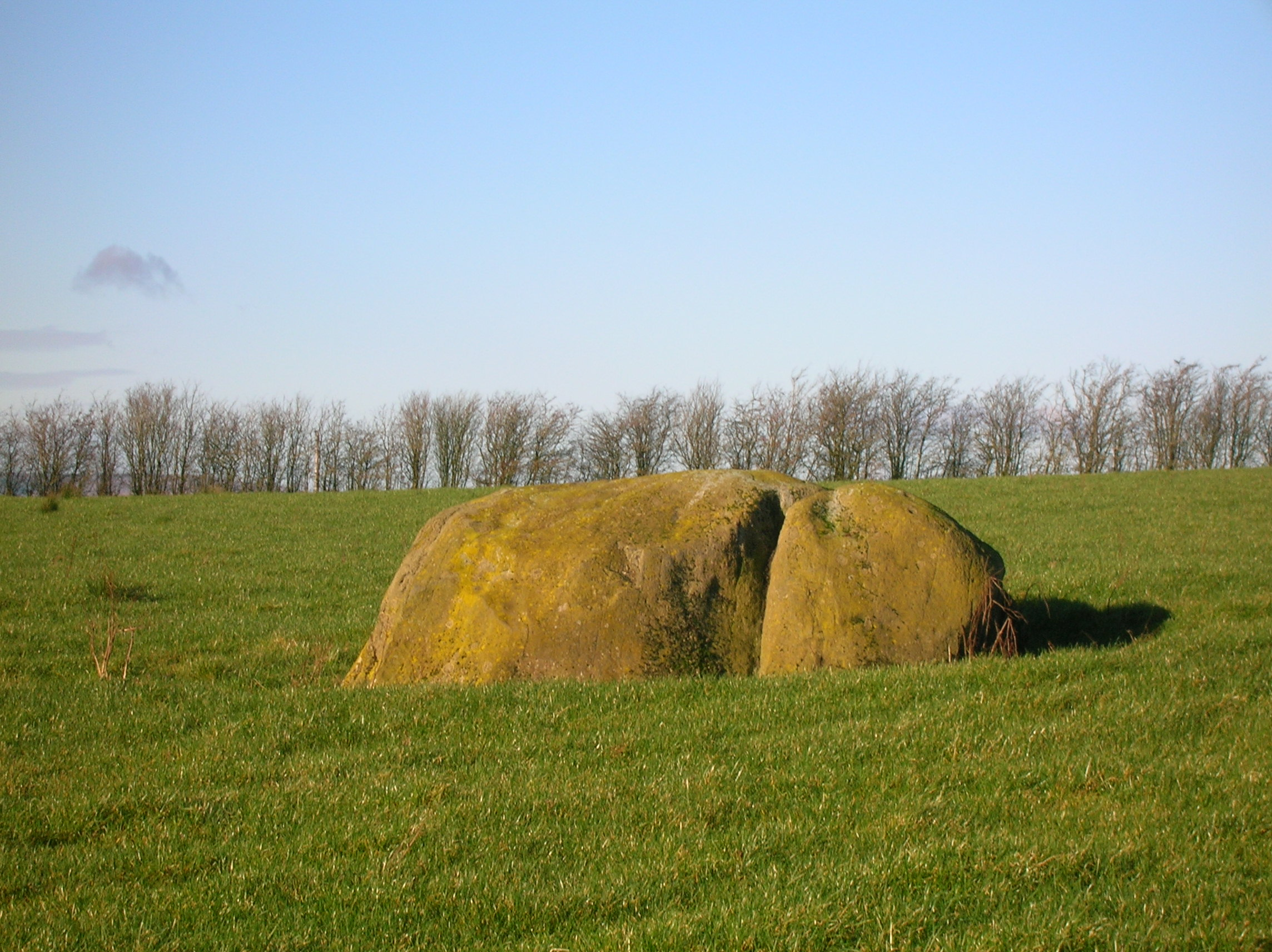
East Side

== The Carlin or Hag's Stone ==
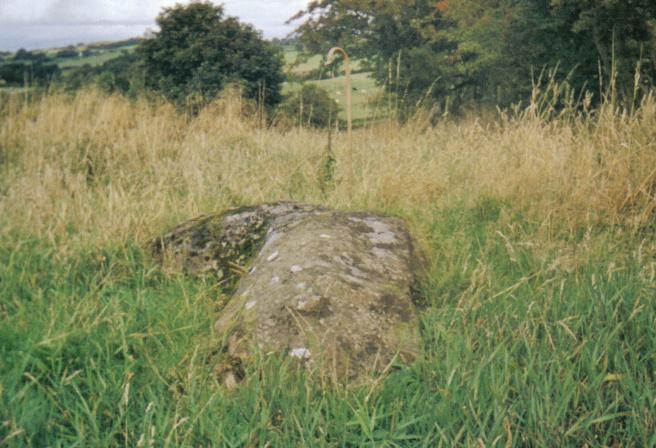
A view of the Carlin Stone.

On top of the Common Crags overlooking Dunlop and the Glazert is a large procumbent boulder known as the 'Carlin's Stone or Stane'. This stone is not as well known as the Thorgatstane. A Carl is a commoner, a husband or in a derogatory sense, a churl or person of low birth. Carlin is the Scots equivalent of Gaelic "Cailleach", meaning a witch or the 'old Hag', goddess of Winter. This would therefore be the Witch's Stone, one of several in Scotland with this name.

Near 'Kirkhill' outside Stewarton are several Kilbrides. Bride, Brigit or St. Brigid was originally a Celtic Goddess linked with the festival of Imbolc, the eve of the first of February. She was the goddess of Spring and was associated with healing and sacred wells, therefore the antithesis of the Carlin. Carlin's Tooth is the name of a rock outcrop in the Scottish borders between Knocks Knowe and Carter Fell (Logan Mack 1926). Several Carling Farms are to be found near Darvel in Ayrshire.

== The Stone of Mannau ==
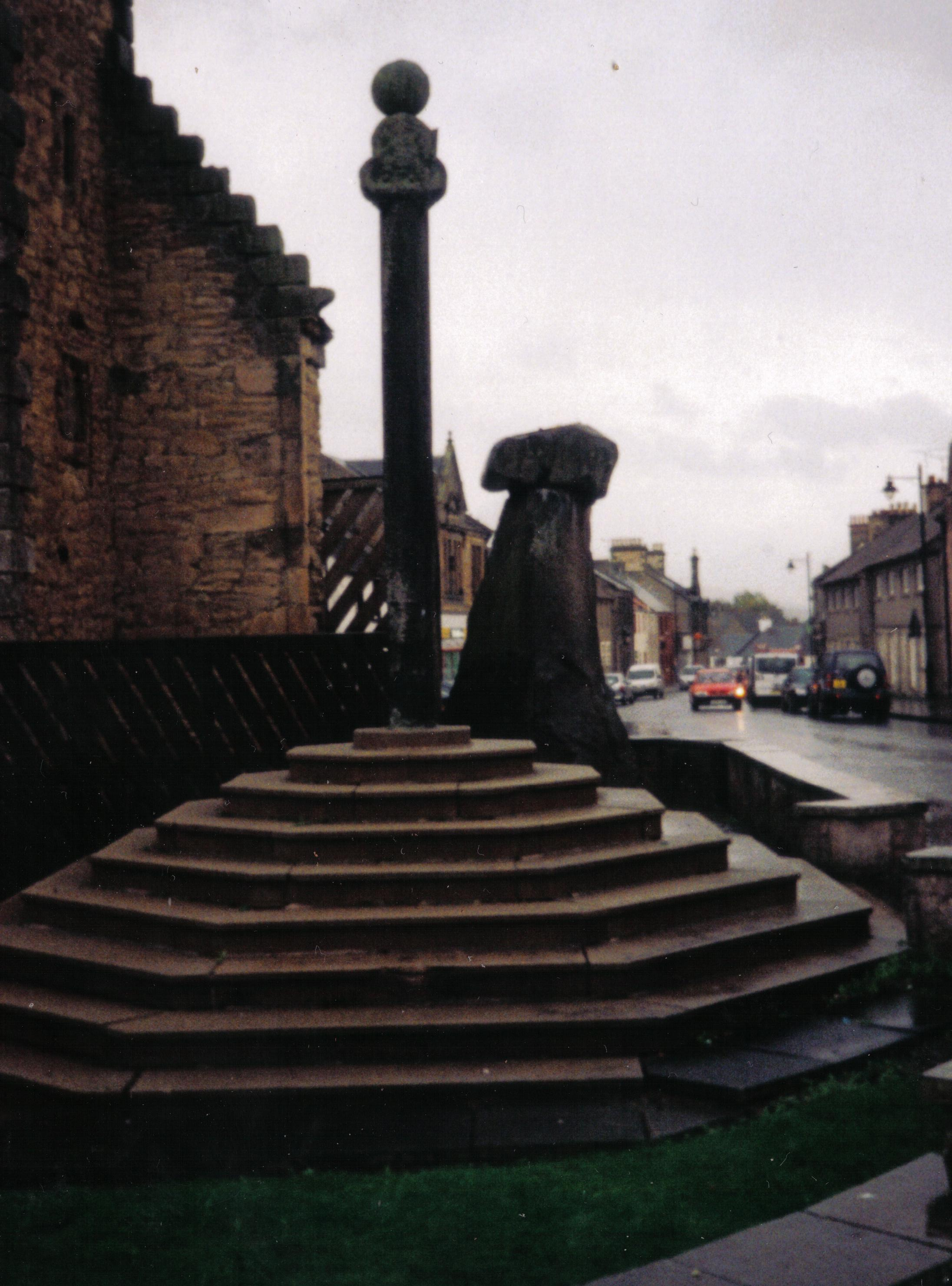
The Mercat cross and Stone of Manau at the 'Tolbooth' in Clackmannan (2005).

Clackmannan (from the Gaelic Clach Mhanainn, 'Stone of Manau') is the name of a small town and local government district in the Central region of Scotland, corresponding to the traditional county of Clackmannanshire, which was Scotland's smallest. The 'Stone of Manau or Manaw' is a monolith of religious significance to the ancient tribes of the area. It has been moved from its original position and placed in the town centre on top of a large standing stone, which was quarried locally.

== The Dagon Stone ==
The RCHAMS 'Canmore' site lists this unhewn olivine monolith in Darvel, Ayrshire, as a 'possible' standing stone. It is rather curious and its general size and shape suggest a prehistoric standing stone. It has twelve small connected depressions spread over three of its sides. These have been said to link the stone to astronomical observations and to the noon-day sun height at mid-summer. This would link the stone to life-giving powers, fertility and prosperity.

In 1821, someone attached a round sandstone ball to the top of it with an iron bar. Who or why is unknown. It is 1.6m tall and its original position is also unknown. It used to stand in what is now the main street, at the end of Ranoldcoup Road as shown by an old photograph, and was moved to the town square when the road was widened.

Documentation shows that prior to the 19th century messings-about, newlywed couples and their wedding parties marched around it for good luck, accompanied by a fiddler. Wedding processions also used to walk three times sunwise round the Dagon stone on the way to the bride's house.

The annual parade or "Prawd", originally held on old New Year's Day, headed by the village band used to walk sunwise round the Dagon stone as a mark of superstitious respect.

== The Dooslan stone ==
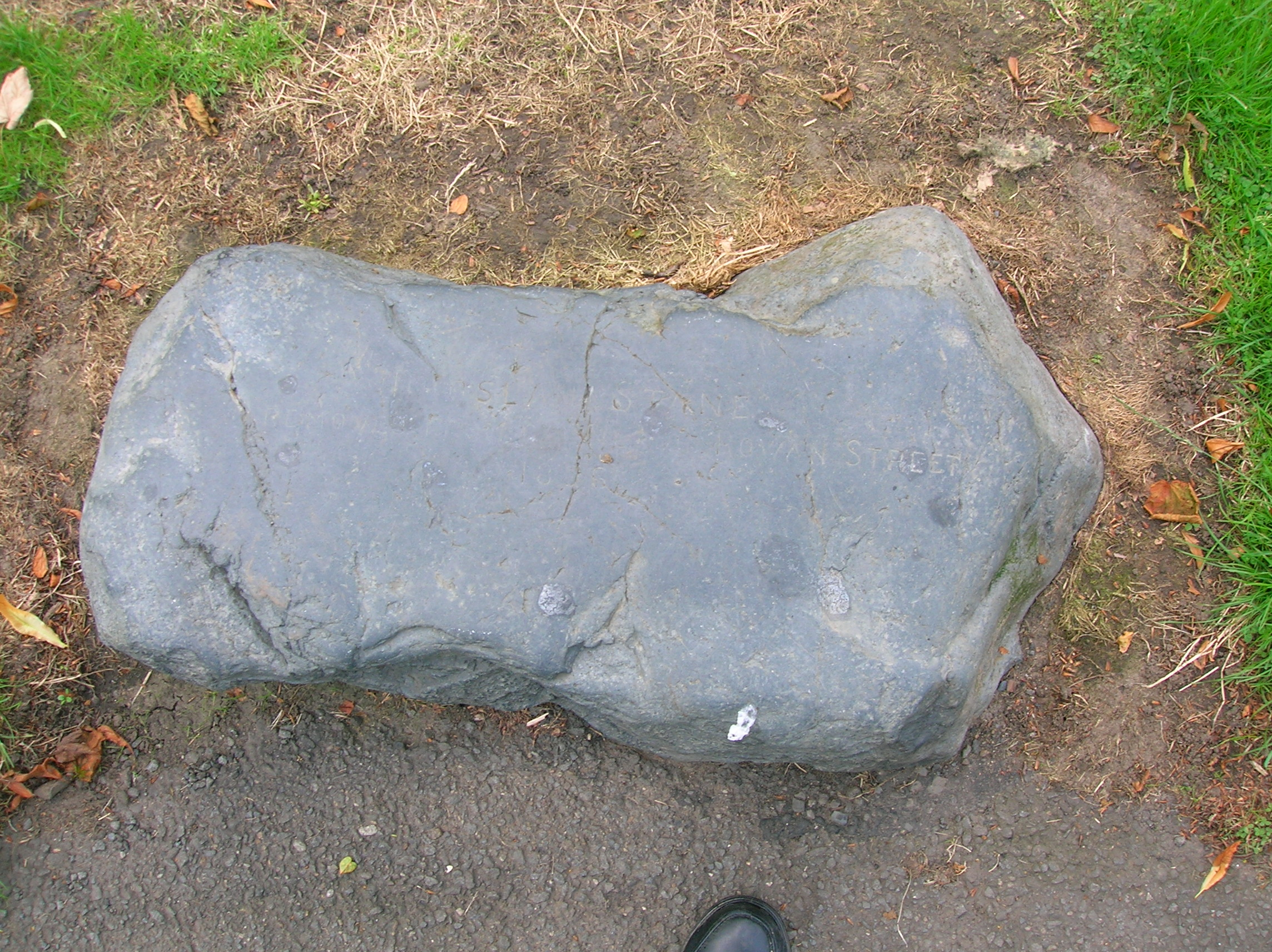
The Doosland Stone and the remains of the lettering inscribed on its surface.

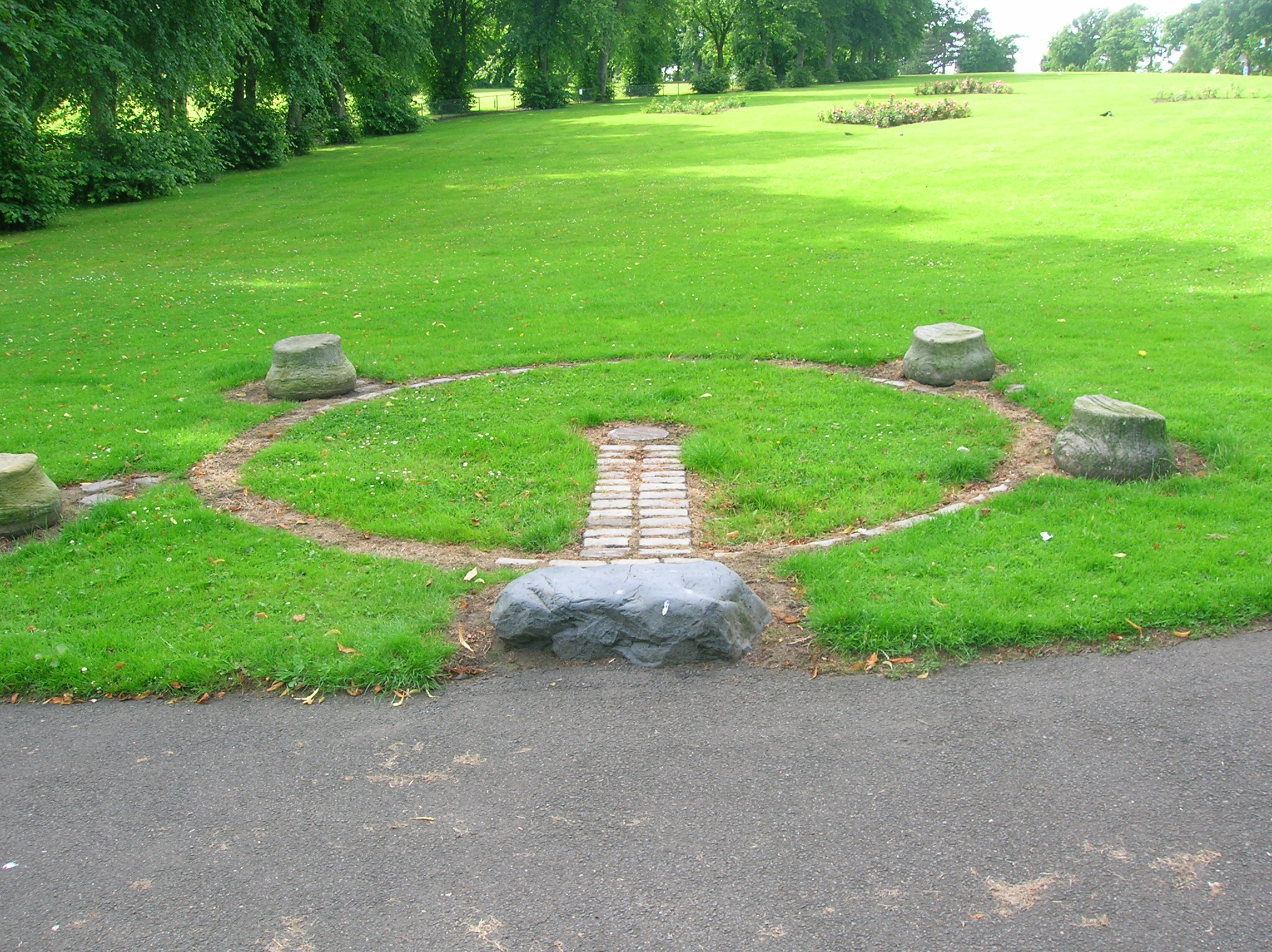
The Dooslan stone and the tolbooth bases in Brodie Park.

This glacial erratic stone now lies in Brodie Park in Paisley. It is thought to have been named after a Mr Dove who laid claim to the stone. Originally to be found at the corner of Neilston Road and Rowan Street in Paisley, the stone was the meeting place of the Weavers Union in the South of Paisley and was also used as a "soapbox". It was later moved to its present location in Brodie Park. The stone is still used today as the meeting point for the annual Sma' Shots parade. Its ancient significance is unknown, but it has played a significant role in historical times and has probably always been a megalith of social significance.

== Some views of Stones of Scotland ==
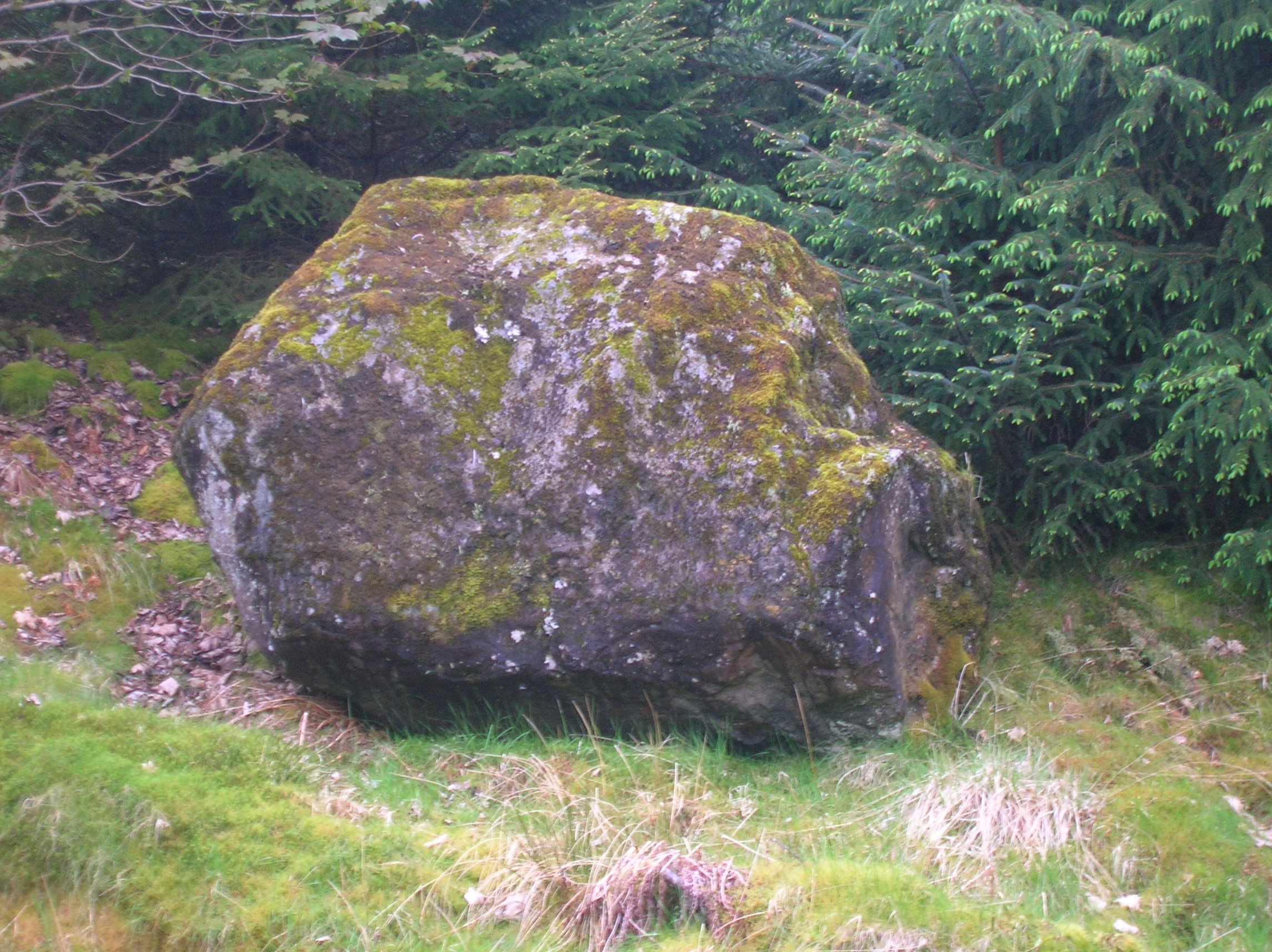
The Carlin Stone near Craigends Farm (2007).

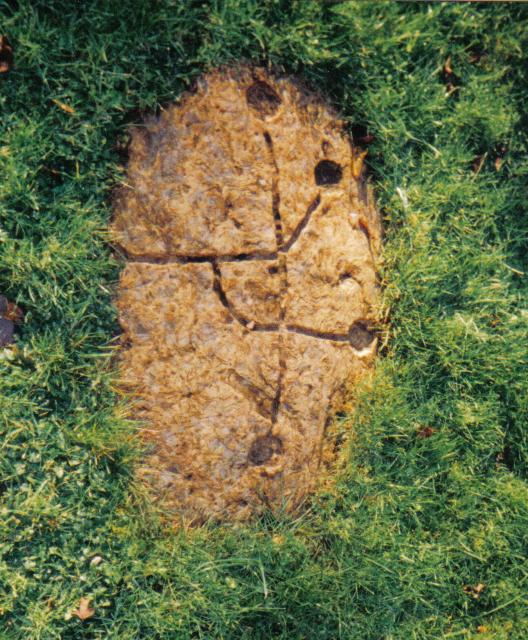
The Dalgarven Mill cup and ring mark stone.

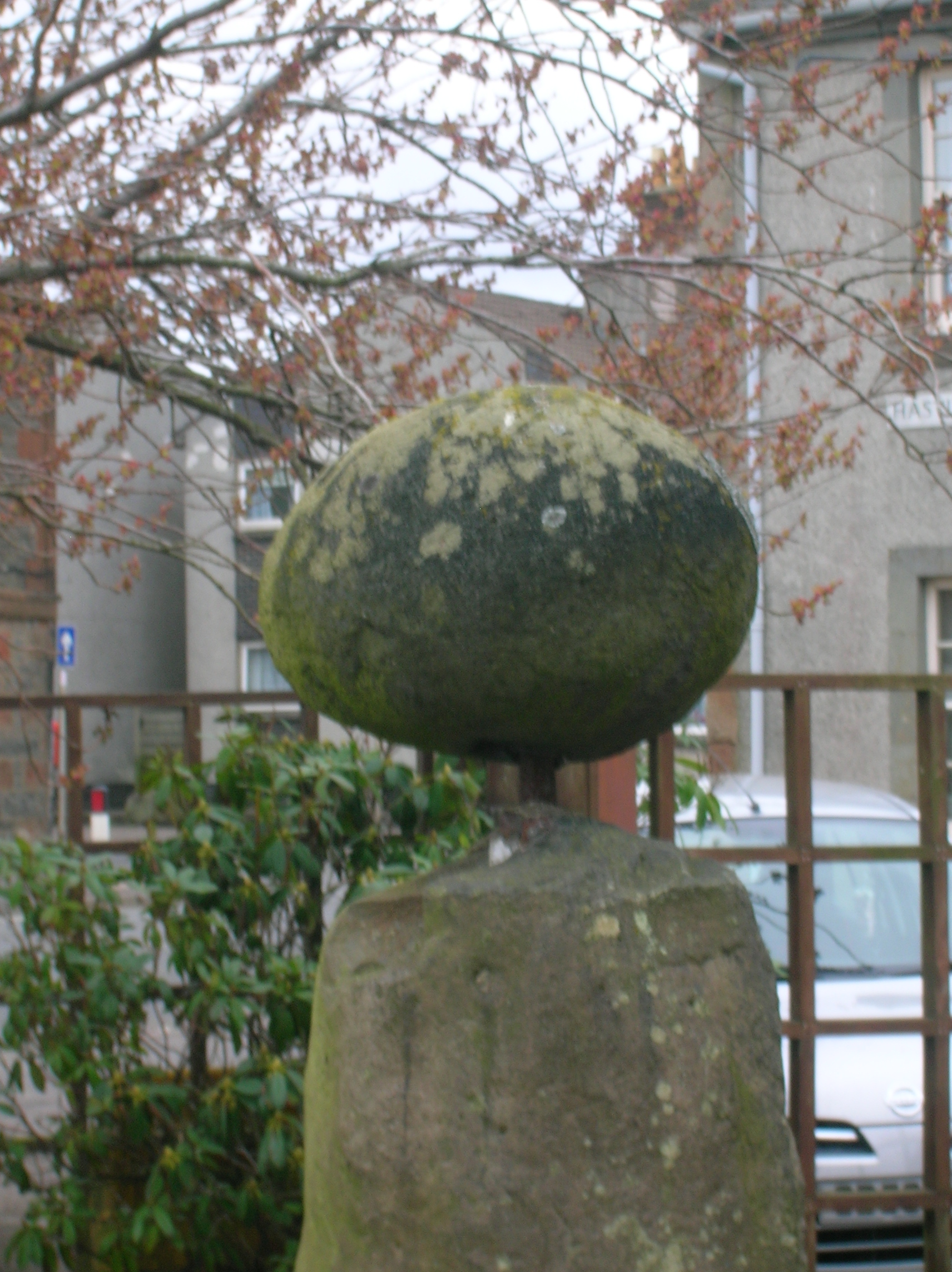
The Dagon stone in Hasting's Square, Darvel (2007).

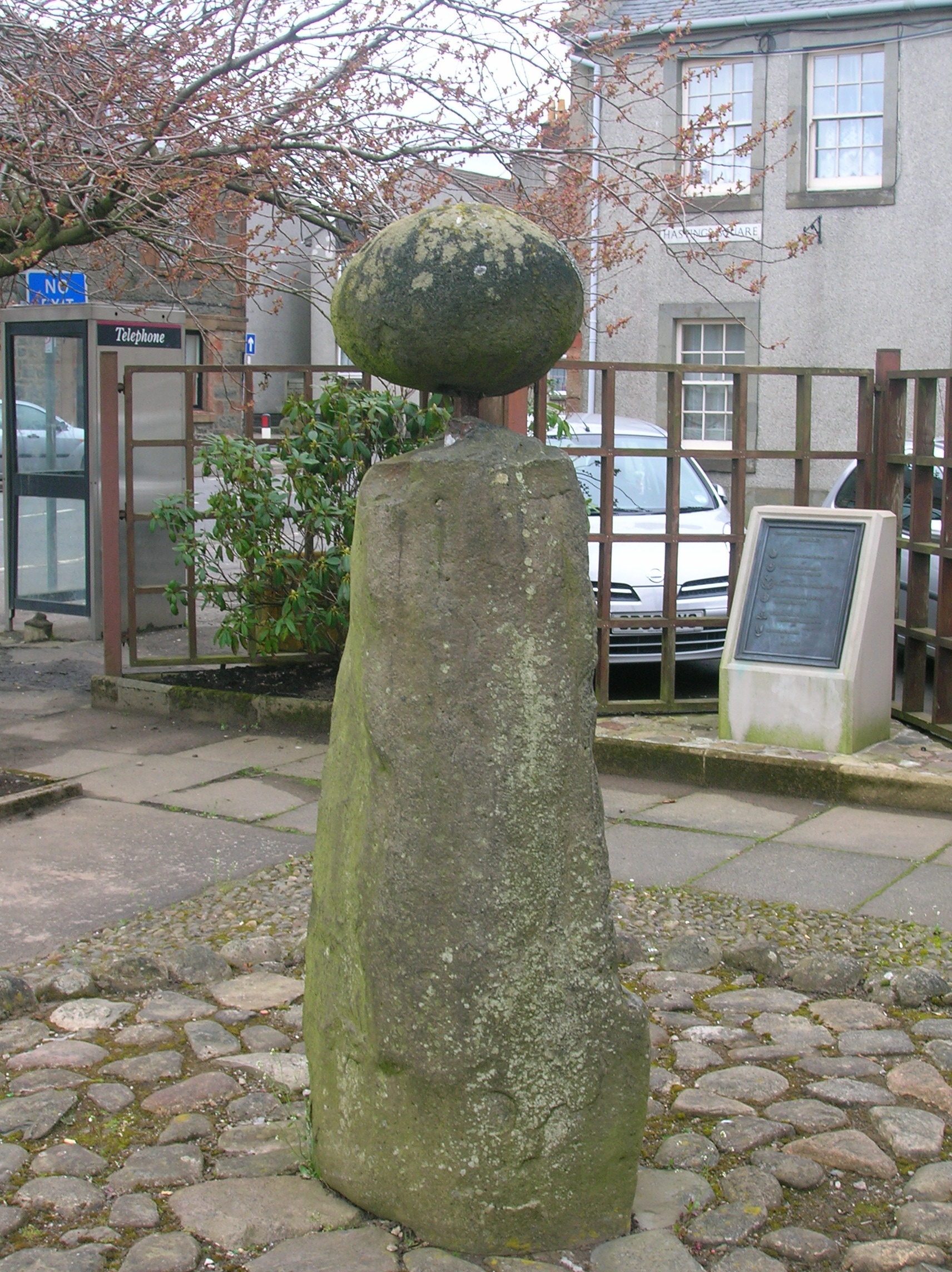
The Dagon stone in Hasting's Square, Darvel (2007).

== Scottish stones in Ayrshire ==
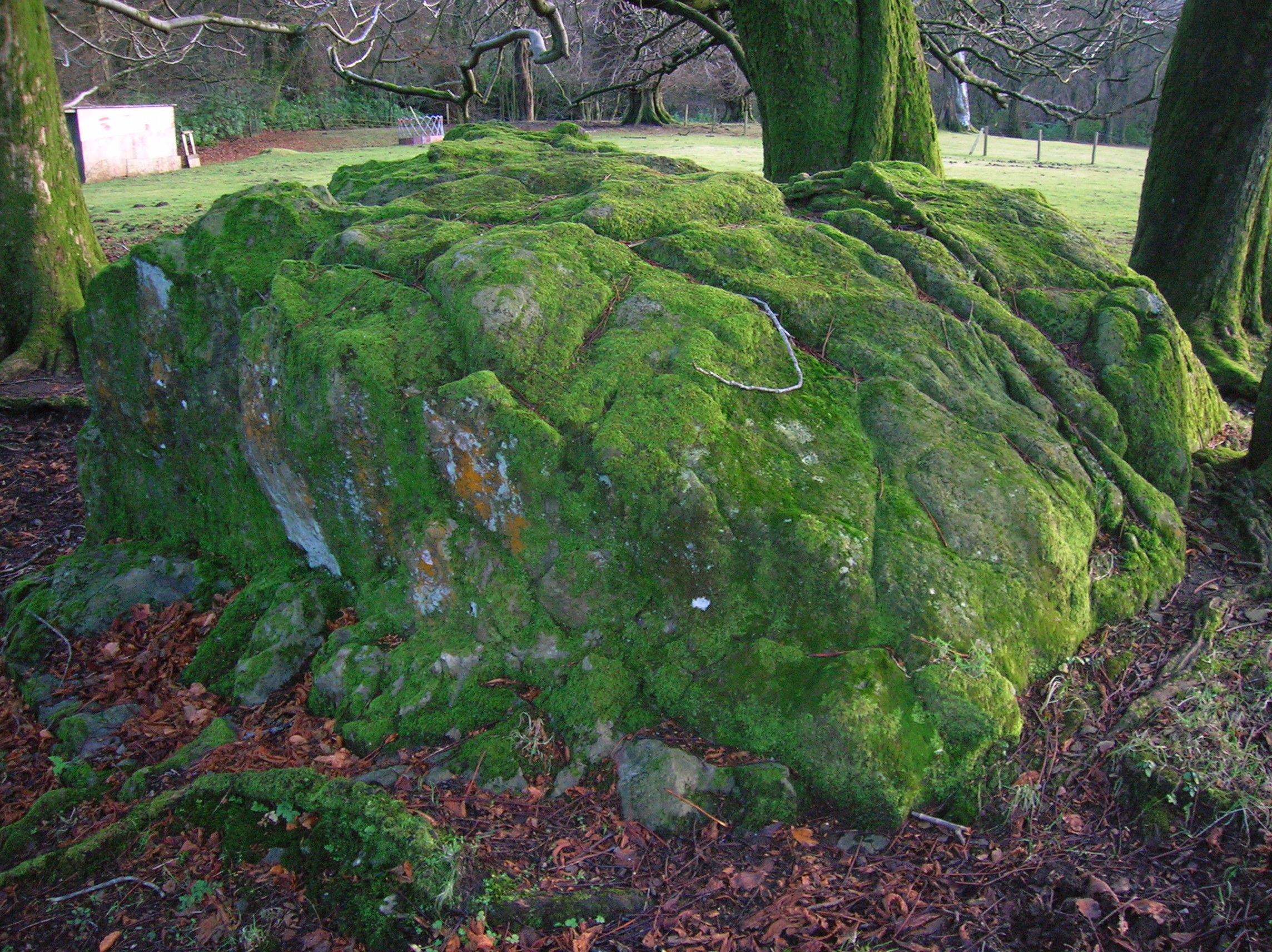
The Deil's Chuckie Stane near Ladyland House.

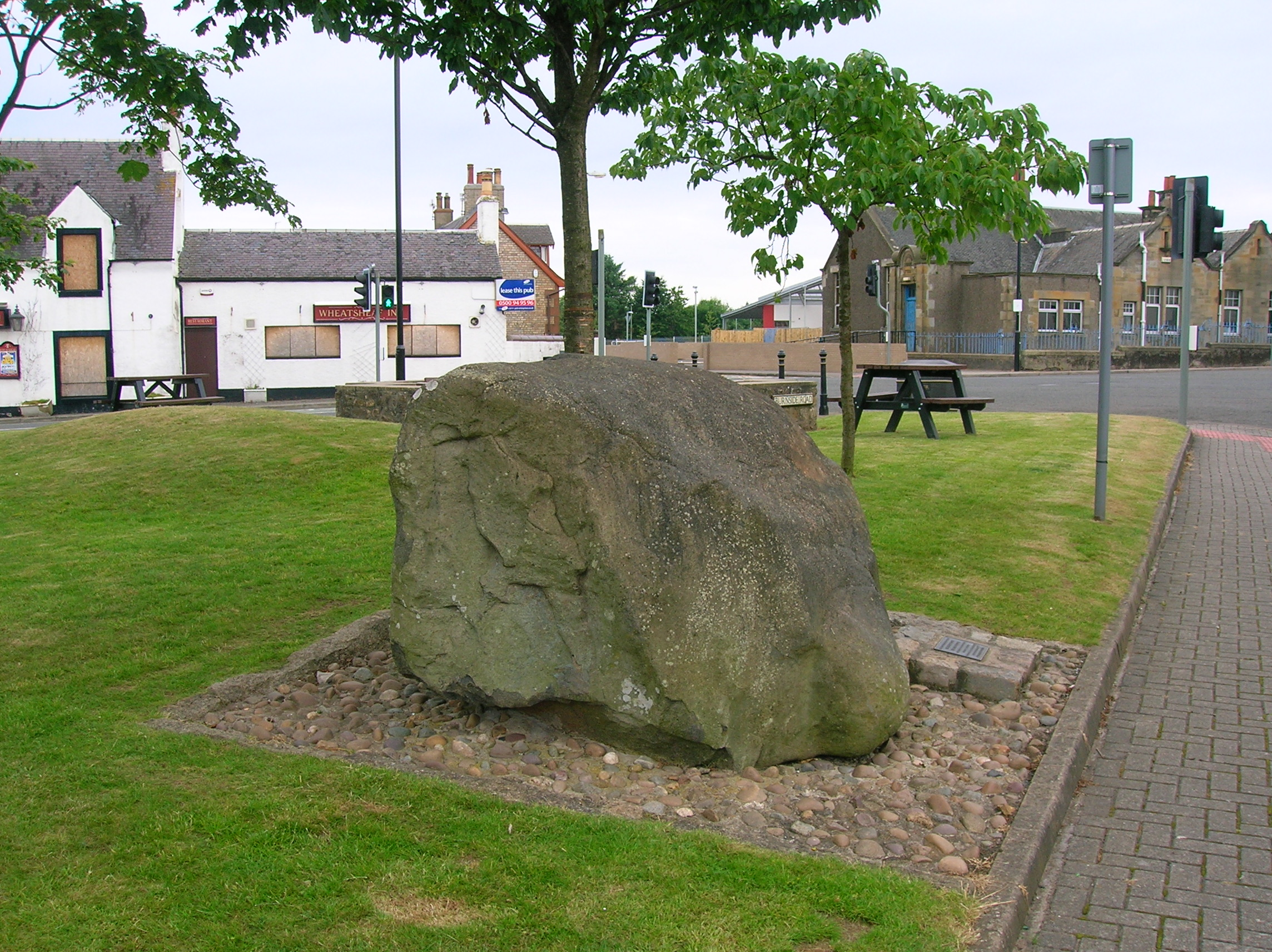
The Hare Stone.

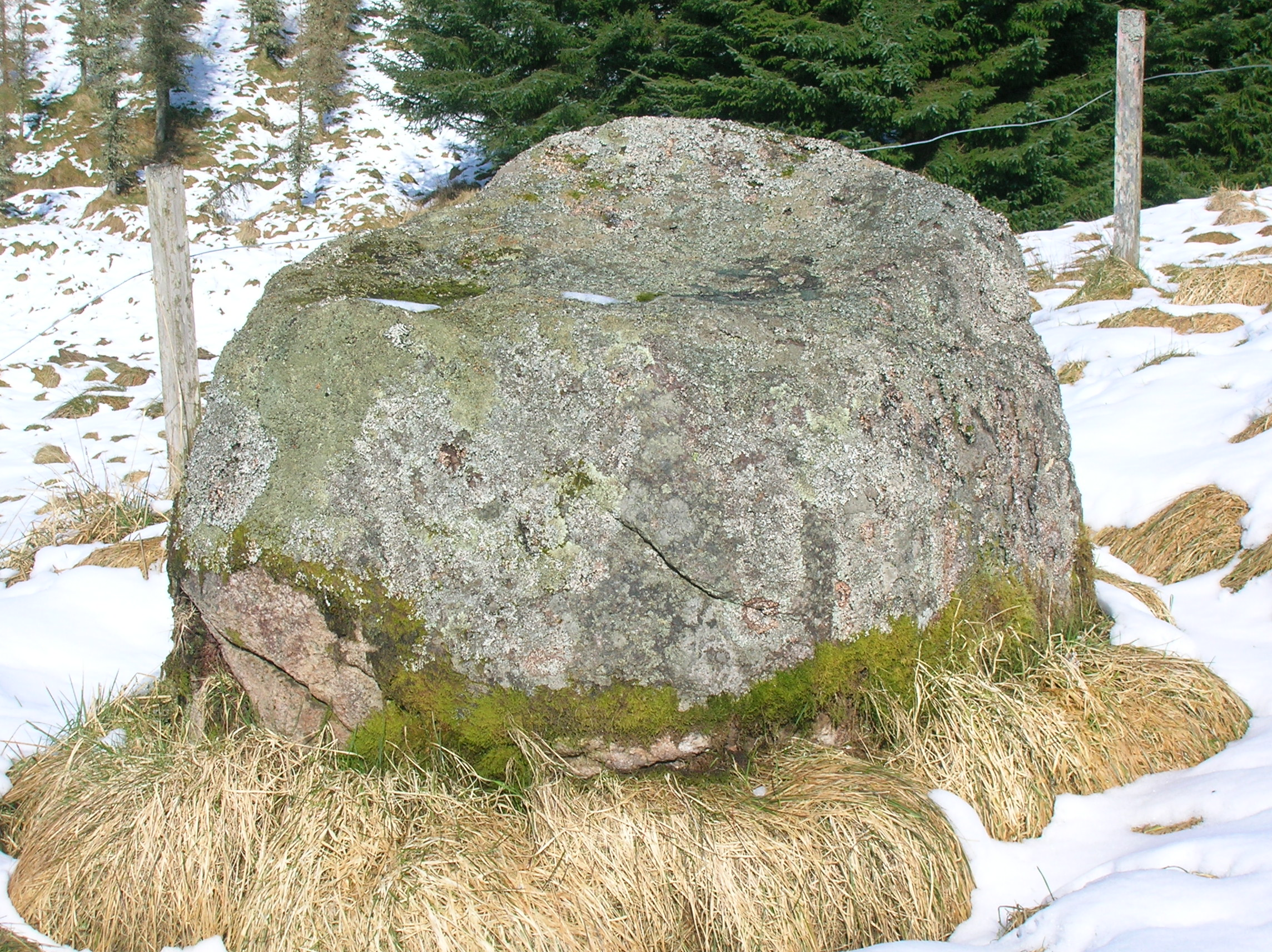
The Gowk Stane.

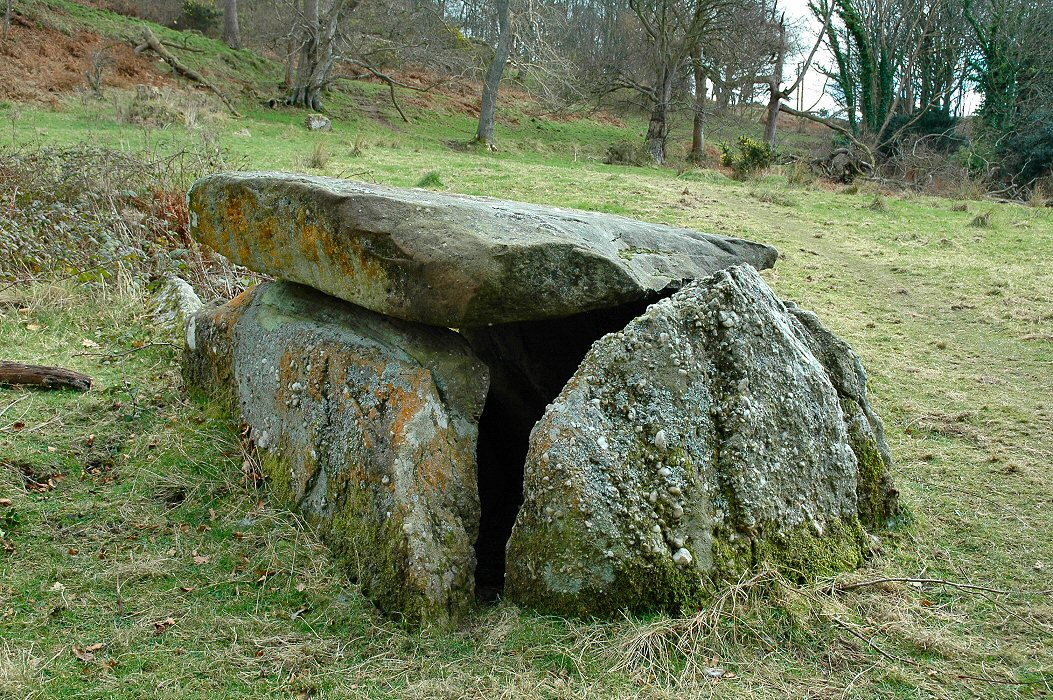
Haylie Chambered Tomb.

=== The Carlin Stone at Craigends ===
A large procumbent boulder known on the OS map as the 'Carlin's Stone' lies next to the Carlin Burn near Craigends Farm below Cameron's Moss in East Ayrshire. The name is the same as the example at Dunlop in East Ayrshire. It has been much visited at one time, with the clear remains of a footbridge running to it across the Hareshawmuir Water.

=== The Deil's Chuckie Stane at Ladyland ===
A large boulder in amongst trees near the David Hamilton designed Ladyland House, Kilbirnie, North Ayrshire. Despite the name no clear legend has been preserved regarding this stone in the neighbourhood. The stone has survived being broken up despite the building of the old Ladyland Castle, stone dykes, farm buildings, etc.

=== The Grannie stane at Irvine in Ayrshire ===
The Grannie Stane (or Granny Stane) is described as "one of Irvine's prehistoric puzzles", this boulder is either left behind from the Ice Age or is the last remaining stone of a stone circle – others were removed, by blasting, after the Irvine weir was constructed in 1895, but popular protests saved this remaining stone. The Grannie Stane is visible when the water is low.

=== The Hare stone ===
The Muckle or Hare stone is a glacial erratic boulder previously located in a nearby field and moved to the centre of Monkton, near Prestwick, in 2000. A number of tales of witchcraft and evil spirits are associated with it.

=== The Gowk Stane ===
Near Laigh Overmuir on the moors above Darvel in East Ayrshire is the Gowk Stane, a glacial erratic boulder located in a prominent position overlooking the upper tributaries of the Glen Water.

=== The Haylie Chambered Tomb ===
In Largs, North Ayrshire resides a Neolithic tomb behind Douglas Park. This monument is known as the Haylie Chambered Tomb and it was once covered by a cairn of stones (known as Margaret's Law). When it was uncovered in the early 20th century, the tomb was dated to around 3000 to 2000 BCE.

== Cup and ring mark stone ==
The purpose of cup and ring marked stones is unknown, however they may represent family trees, star maps, br related to labyrinths, etc. The carvings on such stones date from the Neolithic or Bronze Age times, being as old as 6000 years. This example from Dalgarven Mill in Ayrshire is unusual in having cups and connecting troughs, but no rings and it may therefore have been abandoned at an early stage in its use. Often up to five concentric rings are found circling the central cup.

== Scottish Standing Stones ==
=== Stone Arrangements ===
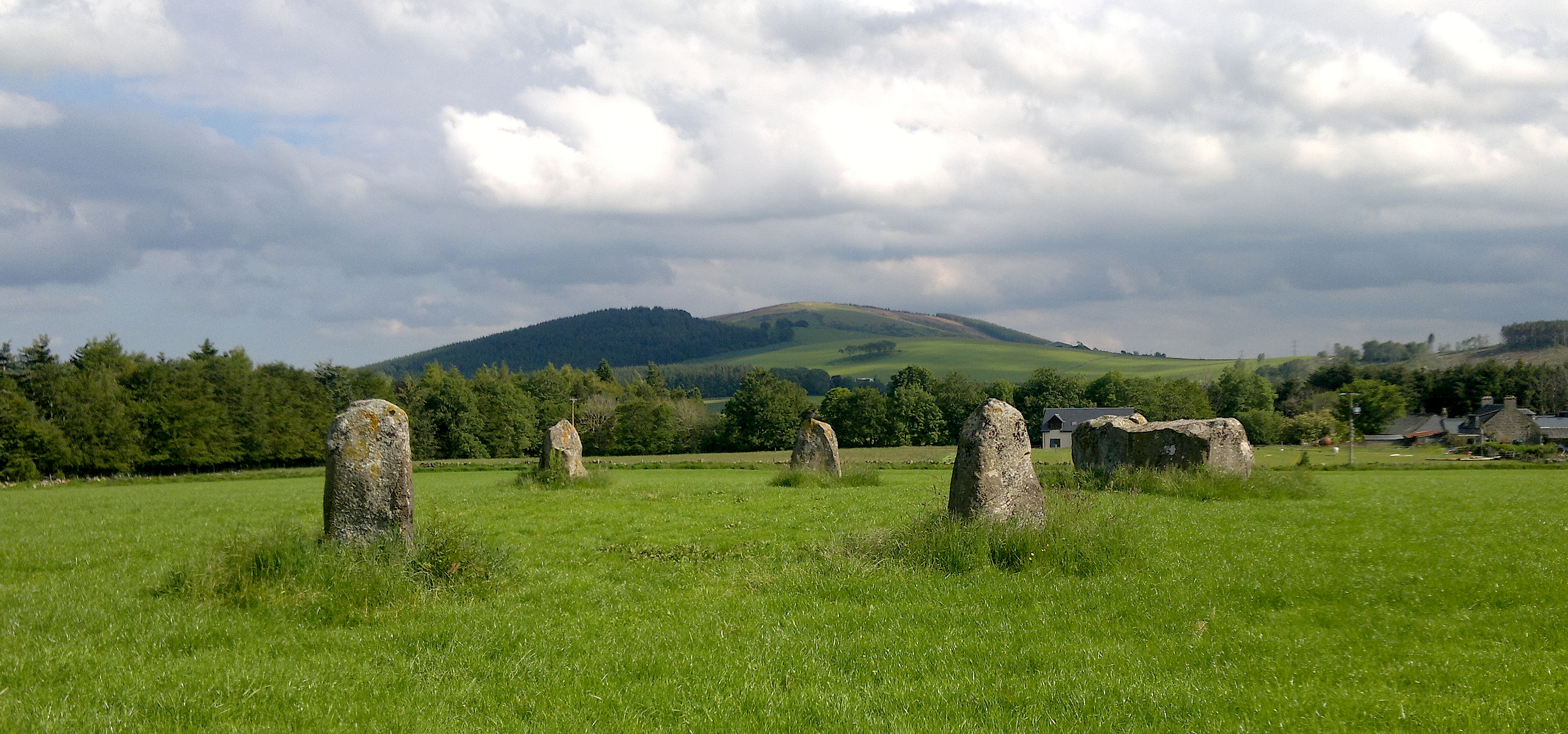
Rothiemay Stone Circle.

Scotland has a number of stone circles (and other arrangements, such as the Celtic Cross formation of the Callanish Stones):

- Calanais (Callanish I)
- Callanish II
- Callanish III
- Callanish IV
- Callanish VIII
- Callanish X
- Cullerlie stone circle
- Dunnideer stone circle
- Easter Aquhorthies
- Loanhead of Daviot stone circle
- Ring of Brodgar
- Sunhoney
- Temple Wood
- The Ringing Stone
- Rothiemay Stone Circle

=== Scottish standing stones ===
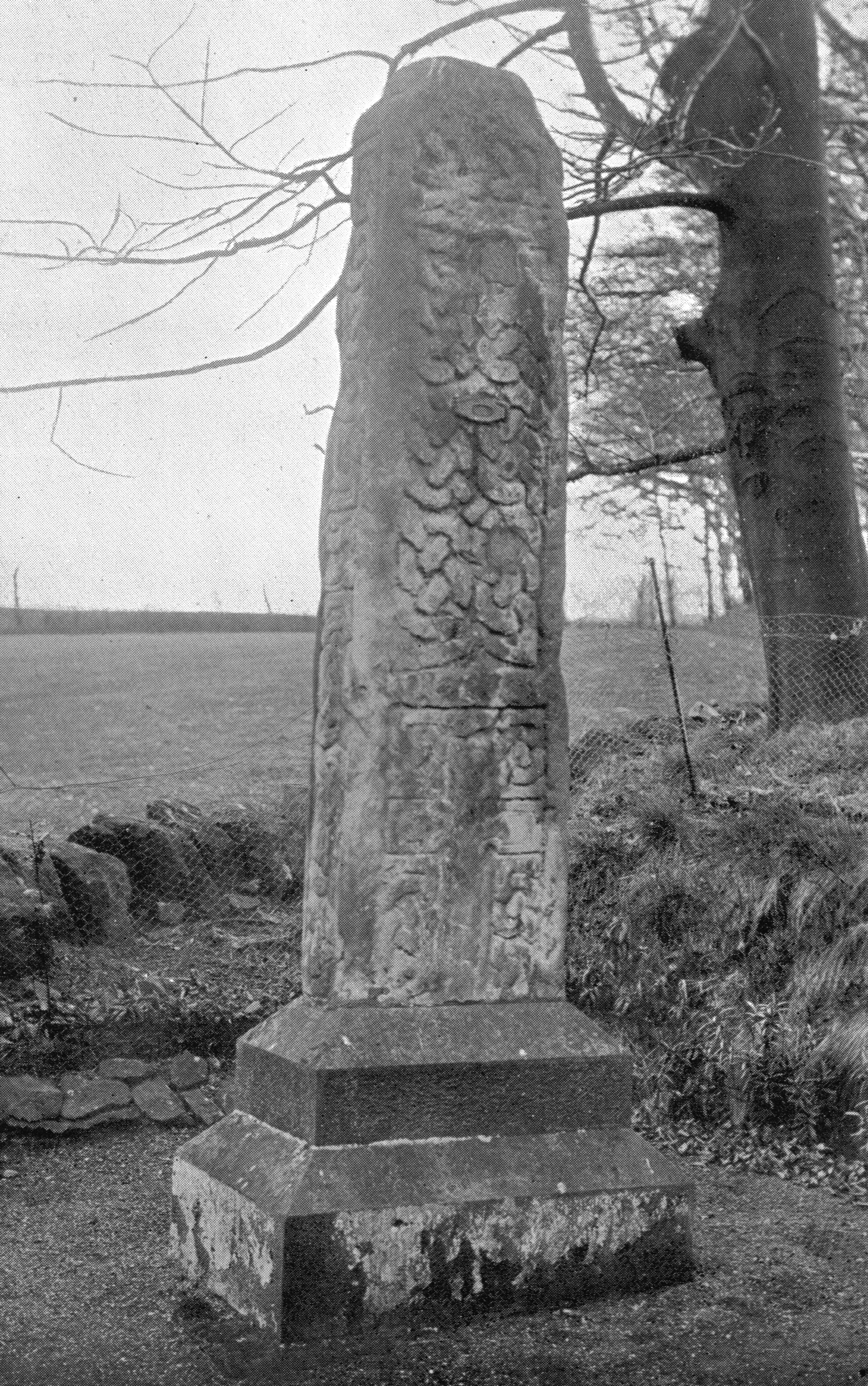
The Arthulie Stone or Cross near Barrhead in Renfrewshire.

Other well-known lone standing stones in Scotland include:

- Achavanich
- Ballymeanoch
- Clach an Trushal
- Comet Stone
- Granny Kempock Stone
- Hill o'Many Stanes
- Nether Largie
- Stones of Stenness
- Watch Stone
- Maiden Stone
- Yarrow Stone, Selkirk
- Dunfallandy Stone
- Picardy Stone
- Ravenswood standing stone

=== Scottish picture stones ===
Some famous Picture stones with carvings on them in Scotland are:

- The Goose Stone
- Tillytarmont
- Red Hill Stone
- Aberlemmo Territorial Stone

=== Scottish recumbent stones ===
Scotland also has a various examples of recumbent stones:

- Easter Aquhorthies Recumbent Stone Circle
- Korskellie Recumbent Stone
- Avochie Recumbent Stone
- The Wolf Stone, Brora, East Sutherland
- Brandsbutt Stone
- Carlin stone, Dunlop, East Ayrshire

== See also ==
- Corsehill
- Corsehill, Lainshaw, Robertland and Dunlop
- List of individual rocks
- Rocking Stones
- Thurgartstone

== Bibliography ==
- MacIntosh, John (1894). Ayrshire Nights Entertainments: A Descriptive Guide to the History, traditions, Antiquities, etc. of the County of Ayr. Pub. Kilmarnock. p. 195.
- Mack, James Logan (1926). The Border Line. Pub. Oliver & Boyd.
