= Midmar =

Coordinates: 57.15°N 2.52°W

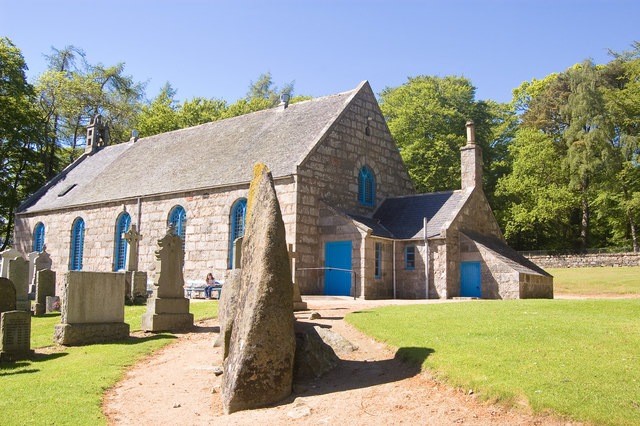
Midmar Kirk and Stone Circle

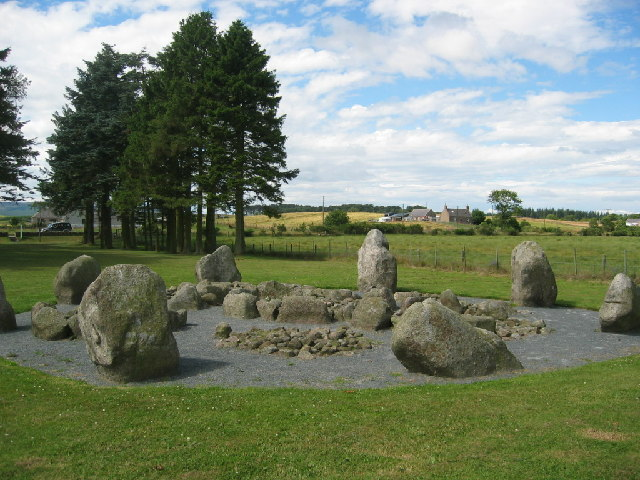
Cullerlie stone circle

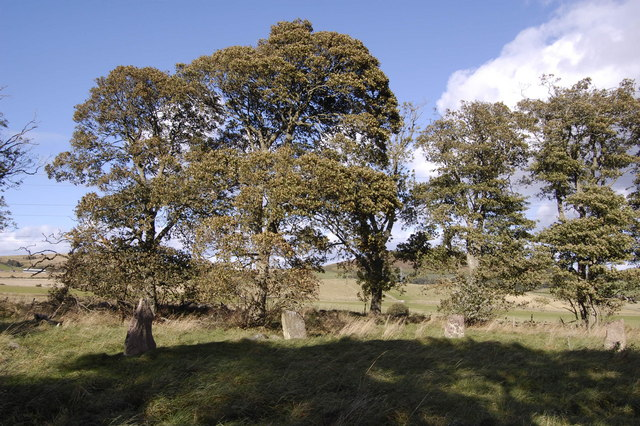
Sunhoney stone circle

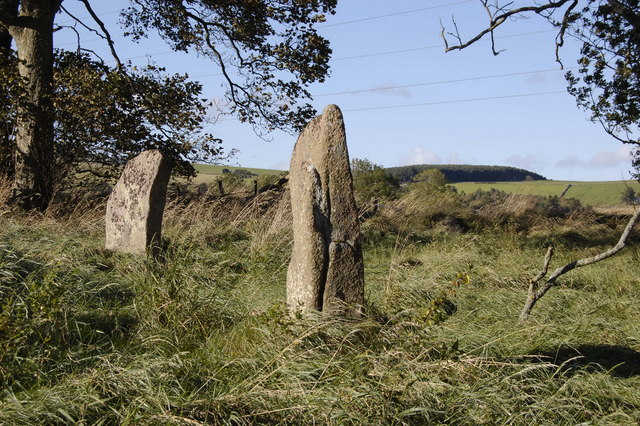
Standing Stones at Midmar

Midmar is a historic settlement in Aberdeenshire, lying north of Banchory and southwest of Inverurie. It is noted for its three stone circles and various standing stones. Midmar and Sunhoney are both recumbent stone circles.

== History ==
The name Midmar, formerly Migmar, is of Pictish origin. The first element is mig- meaning "bog, swamp" (cf. Welsh mig(n)), while the second is the district name Mar.

Midmar is a largely rural community, and links to Midmar Castle and Midmar Manor House. The castle dates from the 16th century. The current church dates from 1787. The previous church, St Nidian's, was located over half a kilometre to the south and now forms part of a scheduled monument that includes a medieval motte known as Cunningar Motte.

The oil boom in the 1970s created a temporary burst in building due to the village's proximity to Aberdeen.

== Stone circles ==
Midmar stone circle lies adjacent to the parish church. The 17m diameter circle features stones up to 2.45m high. The stones have been described as "fang-like". In 1914, the stones were disturbed by the construction of a new graveyard. The circle was scheduled as an ancient monument in 1925 and 1970.

Sunhoney stone circle lies slightly east of the village at Sunhoney Farm. Cullerlie stone circle lies further east. Sunhoney and Midmar are both recumbent stone circles whilst Cullerlie is thought to be a later version.

The three circles are supplemented by other standing stones of similar date, scattered throughout the area. One example is a standing stone 100 metres north of the Midmar circle.

== Notable residents ==
- Prof J. R. U. Dewar (1850–1919), principal of the Dick Vet School in Edinburgh
- Rev John Ogilvie (poet) (1733–1813)
- John Ligertwood Paterson (1820–1882), medical doctor known for work in Bahia, Brazil

== Bankhead ==
Several hamlets are associated with Midmar. One of these, Bankhead, has a former free church chapel (now converted to a domestic residence) that is a category B listed building.
