= Sunhoney =

Stone circle in Aberdeen, Scotland

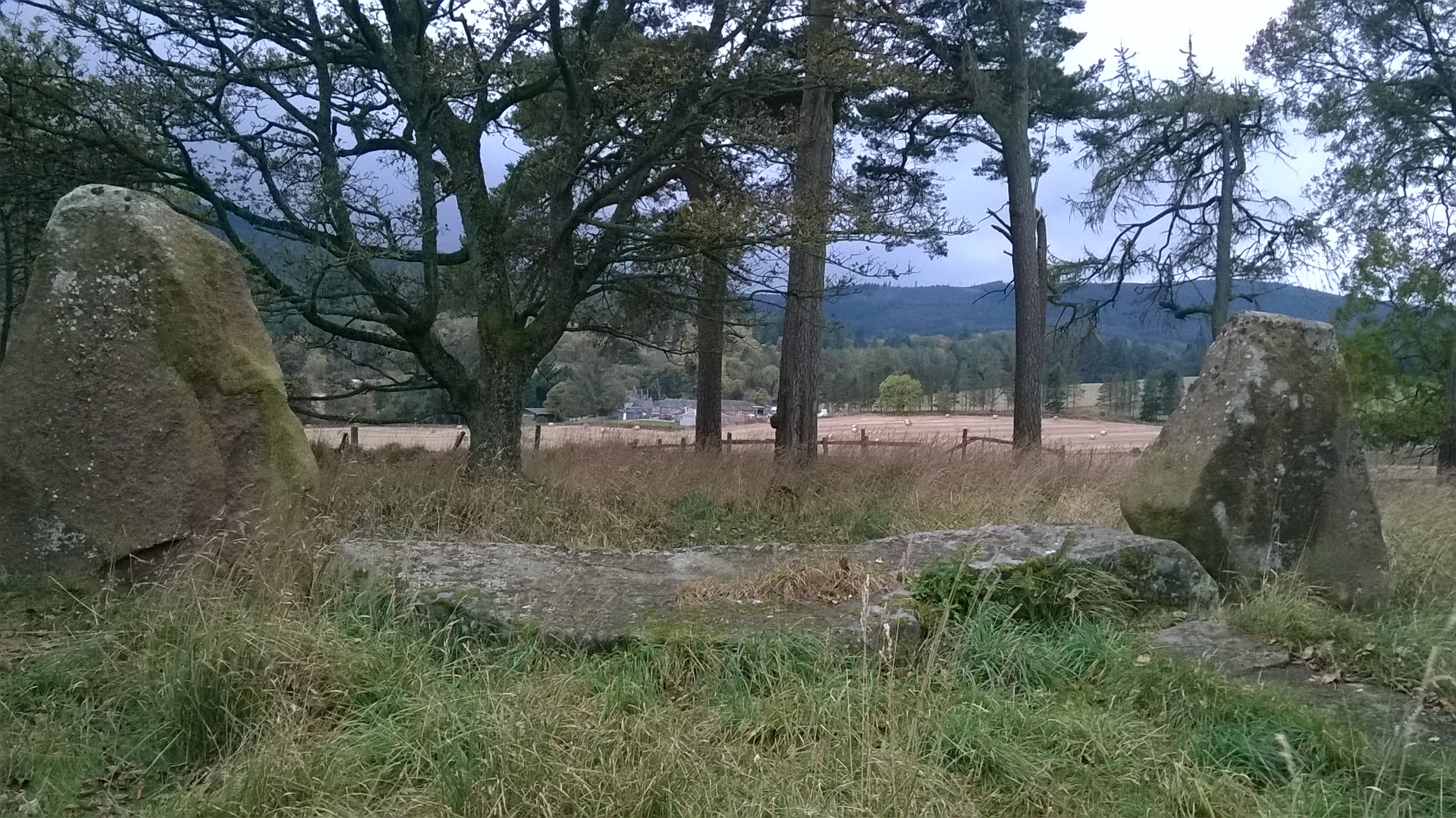
- Recumbent and flankers in 2020
- Interactive map of Sunhoney
- 57.141329°N 2.4710916°W
- Type: Recumbent stone circle
- Location: Scotland
- Region: Aberdeenshire
- OS grid reference: NJ715057

Site notes
- Public access: Yes

Scheduled monument
- Official name: Sunhoeny stone circle
- Type: Prehistoric ritual and funerary: stone circle or ring
- Designated: 31 August 1925
- Reference no.: SM44

Sunhoney is a stone circle of the recumbent type, which is common in the Grampian region, in particular at the River Dee. Sunhoney is situated about 2 km west of Echt in Aberdeenshire, near to the Cullerlie and Midmar stone circles. It is designated a scheduled monument

== Recumbent stone circles ==
A recumbent stone circle is a type of stone circle constructed in the early Bronze Age. The identifying feature is that the largest stone (the recumbent) is always laid horizontally, with its long axis generally aligned with the perimeter of the ring between the south and southwest. A flanker stone stands each side of the recumbent and these are typically the tallest stones in the circle, with the smallest being situated on the northeastern aspect. The rest of the circle is usually composed of between six and ten orthostats graded by size. The builders tended to select a site which was on a level spur of a hill with excellent views to other landmarks. Over seventy of these circles are found in lowland Aberdeenshire in northeast Scotland – the most similar monuments are the axial stone circles of southwest Ireland. Recumbent stone circles generally enclosed a low ring cairn, though over the millennia these have often disappeared. They may have been a development from the Clava cairns found nearby in Inverness-shire and axial stone circles may have followed the design. Whilst cremated remains have been found at some sites, the precise function of these circles is not known.

== Description ==
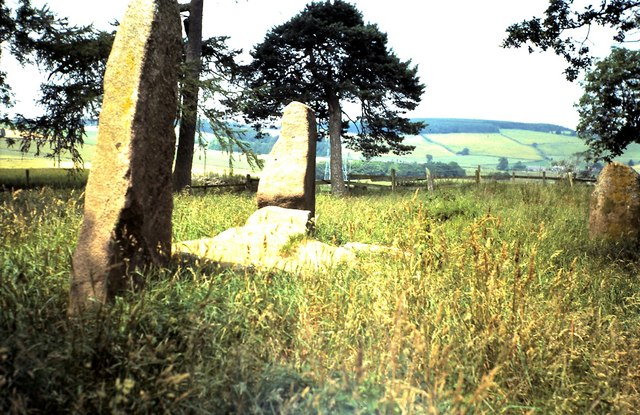
Recumbent stone flanked by two uprights from the side

The circle is 25.40 metres in diameter and is formed by 12 stones, namely the recumbent, two flankers and nine others. The recumbent has broken into two parts and bears a number of cup marks. These have been counted variously as 28, 30 or 31 in total.

Inside the circle is a ring cairn. At the excavation in 1865 by Charles Dalrymple, remains of cremations were discovered. Since it is in relatively good condition, researchers have assessed Sunhoney for its archaeoastronomy. Norman Lockyer was first to do so, then George Browne on two occasions, in 1906 and 1920. Alexander Thom, Aubrey Burl and Clive Ruggles have also more recently worked on the site. The recumbent was observed to face the Blackyduds hill. The most recent geological survey was carried out in 2006 by Simon Howard, Diane Mitchell and Nigel Ruckley.

The site has been designated a scheduled monument. Another recumbent stone circle is about 2 km to the west, at the church of Midmar and Cullerlie stone circle is also nearby.

== See also ==
- Stones of Scotland
- List of recumbent stone circles

== Literature ==
- Anna and Graham Ritchie: Scotland – An Oxford Archaeological Guide. S. 149 Oxford University Press1998 ISBN 0-19-288002-0
