= John Ogilvie (poet) =

Scottish minister, hymn-writer and poet

John Ogilvie or Ogilvy FRSE (18 November 1733- 17 November 1813) was an 18th-century Scottish minister, hymn-writer and poet. A friend of James Beattie and Samuel Johnson he came to fame during his own life-time but had more success with his poetry than with longer texts.

== Life ==
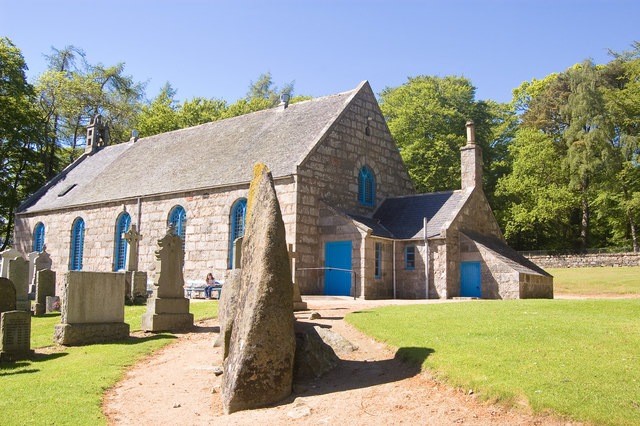
Midmar Kirk

He was born on 18 November 1733 in Aberdeen the son of Rev James Ogilvie. He studied divinity at Marischal College in Aberdeen, graduating MA in 1759 and being immediately ordained in the Church of Scotland. His charge was Midmar in Aberdeenshire, where he served his whole life.

It was to Ogilvie that Samuel Johnson delivered his infamous statement: th noblest prospect which a Scotchman ever sees is the high road that leads him to England (1763).

Aberdeen University awarded him an honorary doctorate (DD) in 1777.

In 1789 he was elected a fellow of the Royal Society of Edinburgh. His proposers were Robert Arbuthnot (Ceylon), Henry Mackenzie, and Andrew Dalzell.

He died in Midmar on 17 November 1813, the day before his 80th birthday.

== Poems ==
- The Day of Judgement (1753)
- Ode to Sleep (1758)
- Ode to Time (1759)
- Ode to Evening (1762)
- Ode to Innocence (1762)
- Providence (1764)
- Solitude: or the Elysium of ther Poets (1765)
- Paradise (1769)
- Rona (1777)
- Fane of the Druids (1784)
- Britannia (1801)

== Hymns ==
- Lo, in the of Days, Behold (1781)
- Paraphrase 62
