= J. R. U. Dewar =

Scottish veterinarian (1850–1919)

John Robert Urquhart Dewar FECVS (1850–1919) was a 19th/20th-century Scottish veterinarian who served as Principal of the Dick Vet school in Edinburgh from 1895 to 1911.

== Life ==
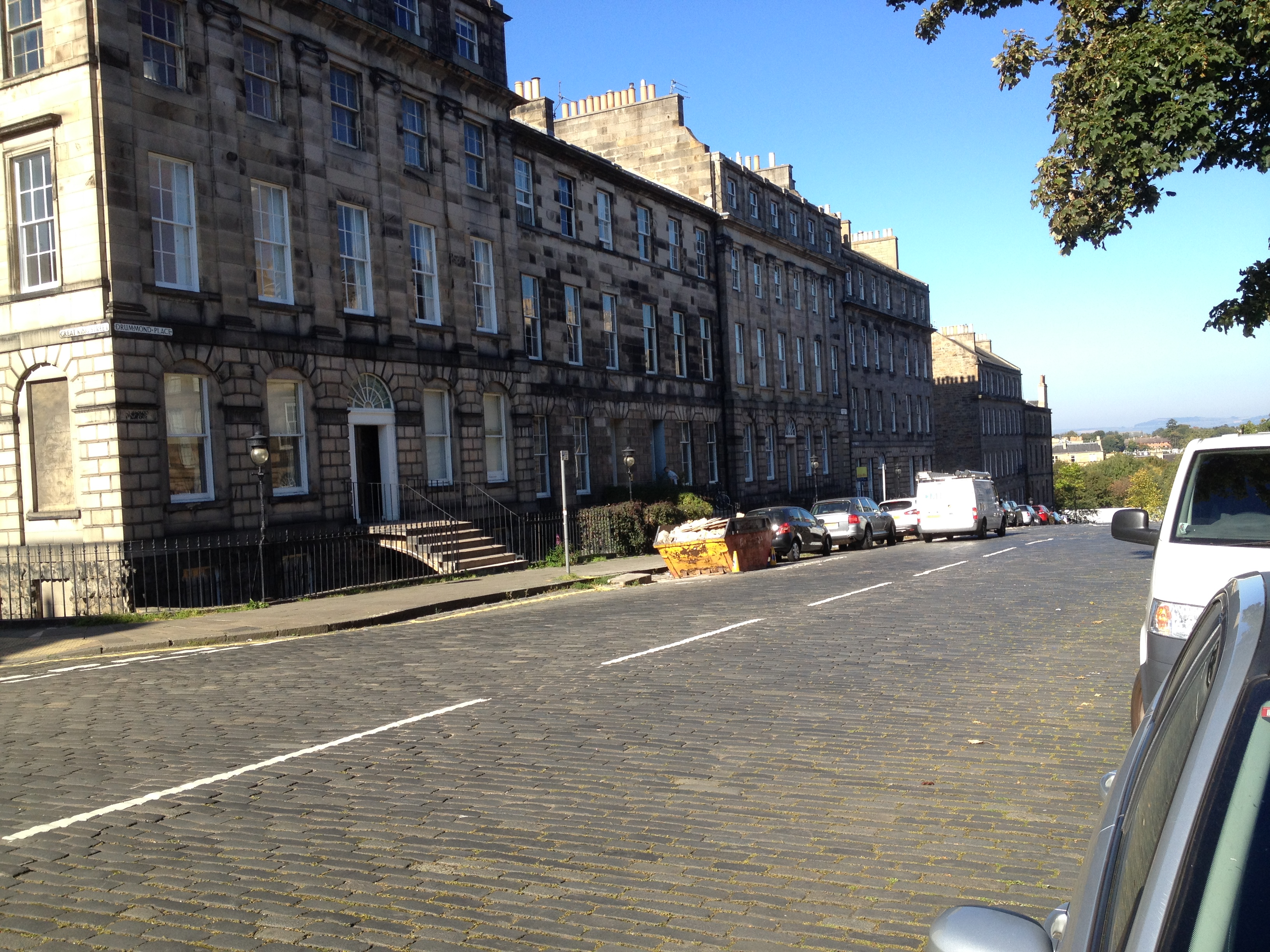
Drummond Place, Edinburgh

He was born on 26 March 1850 in Aberdeenshire.

In 1875, he won a silver medal in General Proficiency from the Highland and Agricultural Society of Scotland. Through the 1870s he was living at Midmar in Aberdeenshire.

He became Veterinary Advisor to the City of Edinburgh.

In 1895, he was appointed Principal of the Dick Vet School in Edinburgh. He was then living at 15 Union Street in the eastern New Town. He oversaw seven professors and 100 students.

By the time of his retiral in 1911 he was living at 18 Drummond Place, a very fine Georgian townhouse.

He died at Fettercairn on 25 October 1919. He is buried in Kinnernie Churchyard.

== Artistic recognition ==
Dewar was one of twenty "shadow portraits" created in the Summerhall building of the college, depicting former Principals. The portraits are now in the Easter Bush buildings.

== Family ==
In 1880, he was married to Mary Wilson Watt (1856-1935). They had three daughters: Mary (1881-1955), Jessy Urquhart (1884-1941) and Helen Agnes (1886-1964)Their only son William Gordon Dewar was drowned in Leith Docks aged 11.
