= Lochmaben Stone =

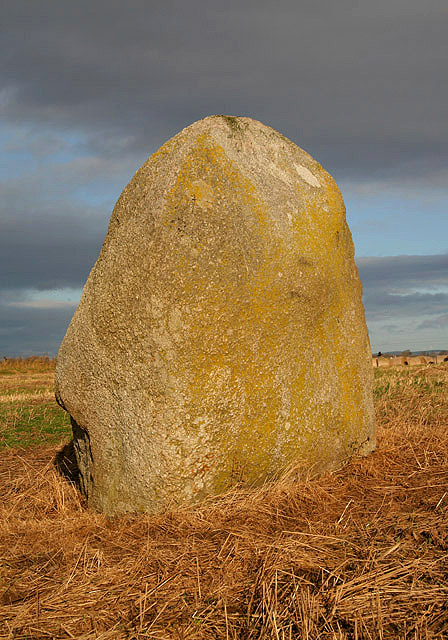
- The stone in 2008
- Interactive map of Lochmaben Stone
- 54.983875°N 3.076073°W
- Location: Scotland, United Kingdom

History
- Built: c. 3275 BC

Site notes
- Height: c. 2.1 meters

Scheduled monument
- Official name: Lochmaben Standing Stone
- Type: Prehistoric ritual and funerary: standing stone
- Designated: 31 December 1973
- Reference no.: SM3378

The Lochmaben Stone (grid reference NY 3123 6600) is a megalith on the shore of the Solway Firth in Dumfries and Galloway, Scotland. It lies by the mouth of the Kirtle Water, near the town of Gretna. Together with a smaller stone, it is all that is left of a stone circle that was built around 3275 BC.

The principal stone or megalith has, in the Borders context, an unsurpassed extent of history attached to it. It is an erratic stone that is 7 feet (2.1 m) tall and 18 feet (5.5 m) in girth, and it weighs approximately 10 long tons (10,000 kg). It is composed of weathered granite, exposed to severe glacial action.

In these treeless flatlands this stone, given its size, would have been a distinctive landmark on the flat Solway Plain for several millennia.

== Etymology ==
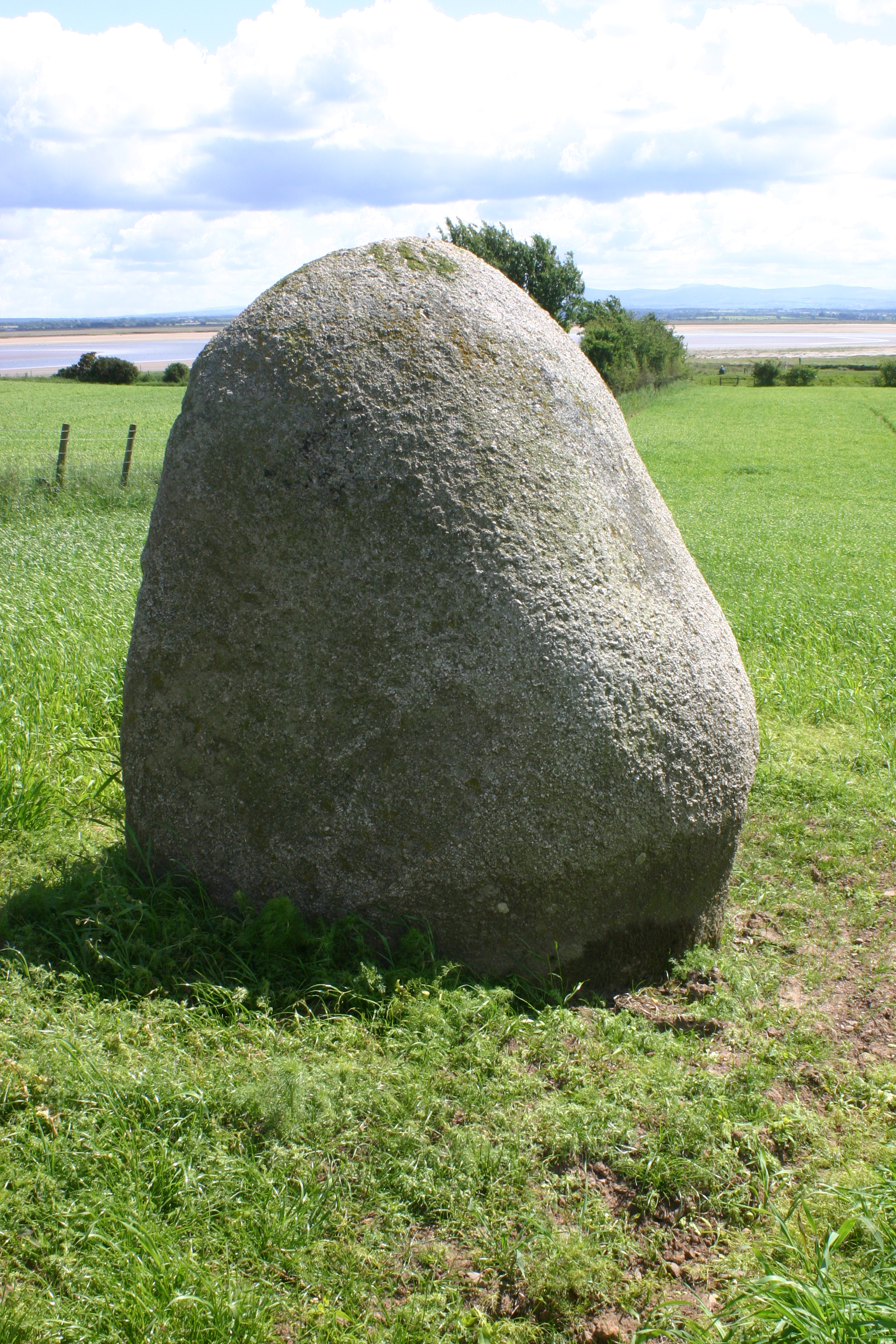
The principal Lochmaben Stone from the north

The stone is referred to as Clochmabenstane in 1398, as Loumabanestane in 1409, and as Lochmabenstane in 1448. The name comes from the Brittonic clog Mabon, meaning "Mabon's stone", in reference either to the god of that name or to some individual who shared his name with the god. Later, the Scots word stane was suffixed to the name, and the initial C was dropped (a result of confusion with the name Lochmaben).

The Lochmaben Stone may be the "pillar" referred to in the name Solway Firth (from Norse Súlvaðfjǫrðr, "estuary of the pillar ford").

== Archaeology ==
The first edition Ordnance Survey six-inch map (1843–1882) refers to it as "Druidical circle (Remains of)", which the Ordnance Survey Name Book states as being formerly composed of nine upright stones placed in an oval of about 0.5 acres (2,000 m^{2}). Only two of these stones are visible above the surface of the ground, one being the Lochmaben Stone. The other stone stands 1 m high by 1.2 m in diameter in a less conspicuous position in the nearby hedge to the north east of the larger stone. The 1845 'New Statistical Account' also relates that a ring of large stones once stood here, enclosing an area of around half an acre, most of which were removed shortly before that date to facilitate ploughing of the site.

In 1982 the stone fell over, and excavations prior to its re-erection revealed that it had been set into a shallow pit. No artifacts were recovered. However, a sample of mixed Oak and Hazel charcoal taken from the lower fill of the stone-pit yielded a radiocarbon date of approximately 3275 BC according to Aubrey Burl.

== The cult of Maponus or Mabon ==
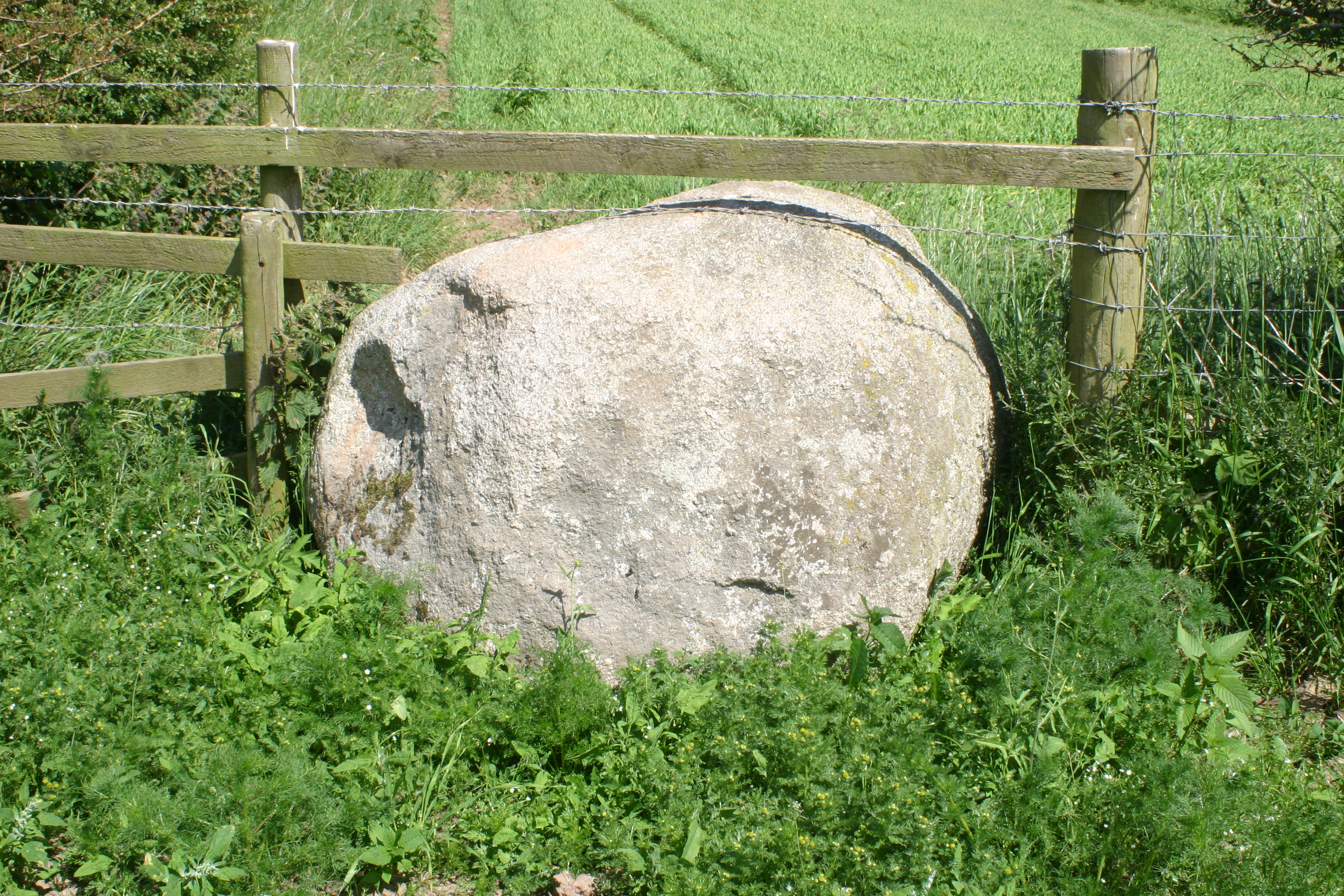
The smaller Lochmaben Stone incorporated into a hedge

The name of the stone strongly suggests that this site was a centre of the cult of the Celtic god Mabon or Maponus. The name has its origins in map, the Old Welsh for "son of" and is suggestive of a divine youth. He is said to have been the divine patron of the Kingdom of Rheged and dedications to his cult have so far been found at Birrens, Brampton, Chesterholm (Vindolanda), Corbridge and Ribchester. Mabon may have been a god of fertility: the Romans made him a British Apollo. Tolstoy sees Merlin as a chief druid carrying out ceremonies at the Clochmabenstane.

Sometime during the seventh century, an unknown monk in the Monastery at Ravenna on the Adriatic (eastern) coast of Italy compiled a list of all the towns and road-stations throughout the Roman Empire; this important historical document has since become known as the Ravenna Cosmography and it lists a 'Locus Maponi' which has been tentatively identified with the Lochmaben stone site.

== The border line and the Lochmaben Stone ==
The Lochmaben Stone was a well known, well recognised and easily located "marker" on the Scottish Marches and as such it performed a number of functions prior to the Union of the Crowns, such as arrangements for truces, exchange of prisoners, etc.

=== Rendezvous ===
Raiding parties met here before launching expeditions into England and Scottish armies assembled here before major incursions or defence operations took place. It may well have been a tribal assembly point. An army was ordered to assemble here as late as 6 February 1557.

=== Exchange of prisoners ===
In 1398, an exchange of prisoners took place when English and Scots representatives, the Dukes of Rothesay and Lancaster met at the Lochmaben Stone. The prisoners were released without ransoms and any that had already been paid were to be returned.

=== The Commissioners and the Wardens of the Western Marches ===
Its use by the Marcher Lords or Wardens suggests that the Scots regarded the Lochmaben stone as being the southernmost limit of the Scottish realm. In 1398, an indenture was made at "Clochmabenstane" for the men of Tyndale and Redesdale to meet from Whitsunday to Michaelmas at Kershope Bridge. The Commissioners not only met here, but "gave bail for their good behaviour to one another."

In 1398, the agreement was reached that "The men of Galloway, Nithsdale, Annandale and Crawford Muir, shall meet with the Wardens of the West March for redress of claims at Clochmabanestane."

In 1473, the Scottish and English ambassadors met to agree that more frequent meetings of the marcher Wardens were to be held at the six recognised sites on the marches. These were Newbyggynfurde, Redaneburn, Gammyllispethe, Belle, Loumabanestane and Kershopebrig and the meetings were to be held at successive venues. On 26 March 1494, the commissioners of both countries met at the Lochmaben Stone to finally settle the long running dispute over the "Fish Garth" across the River Esk.

In the 16th century a reference is recorded "Loughmaben Stone standyng in Scotland, wher we have beyn accustomyd to keipe days of marches."

== Recent history ==
In the 1800s, the tenant of Old Graitney farm decided to clear his land of the three remaining stones which ruined his field's appearance and got in the way of his machinery. He set his farmhands to work digging deep pits for the burial of the stones. One had been completely buried and another partially sunken when the proprietor, Lord Mansfield, arrived at the scene and stopped further operations. The stone was still used as a gathering place for the locality into comparatively recent times.

A local tradition suggests that the stone was moved by a farm worker with an excavator, the intention being to locate any "treasure" beneath. The local primary school attended an official re-erection ceremony which was covered by the local paper, the Dumfries and Galloway Standard 22 September 1995.

== See also ==
- Stones of Scotland
- Stone circles in the British Isles and Brittany
- List of stone circles
