= Echt, Aberdeenshire =

Coordinates: 57.14054°N 2.43455°W

Echt: Scottish Gaelic: Eicht
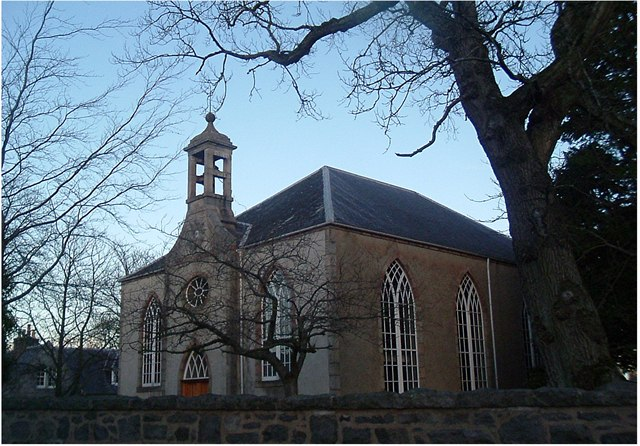
- Echt church, built 1804

- Location within Aberdeenshire
- OS grid reference: NJ739055
- Council area: Aberdeenshire
- Lieutenancy area: Aberdeenshire
- Country: Scotland
- Sovereign state: United Kingdom
- Post town: WESTHILL
- Postcode district: AB32
- Police: Scotland
- Fire: Scottish
- Ambulance: Scottish
- UK Parliament: West Aberdeenshire and Kincardine
- Scottish Parliament: Aberdeenshire West

Echt (Scottish Gaelic: Eicht) is a crossroads village in Aberdeenshire, Scotland. Echt has a number of prehistoric remains, including the Barmekin of Echt, a prehistoric hillfort on a hill to the northwest. There is also the Cullerlie stone circle near Sunhoney Farm, which may date from the Bronze Age.

Echt contains a church, a village shop and post office, a restaurant (Echt Tandoori), and a pleasure park with a children's play area. Local football matches are also held there. The annual Echt Show, a farmers' show, is held on the second Saturday in July.

It is centred on the junction of the B977 Dunecht to Banchory road and the B9119 Kingsford to Ordie road. It is some 12 1/2 miles (20.1 km) from the city of Aberdeen.

== Literary associations ==
Echt was the birthplace, in 1896, of Chris Guthrie, the fictional heroine of Lewis Grassic Gibbon's trilogy A Scots Quair. In the 1890s, Jean Baxter, author of the collection of poems in Scots A' Ae 'Oo (1928), spent part of her childhood in the village, while her family kept the Balcarres Arms Hotel.
