= Cullerlie stone circle =

Stone circle in Aberdeenshire, Scotland

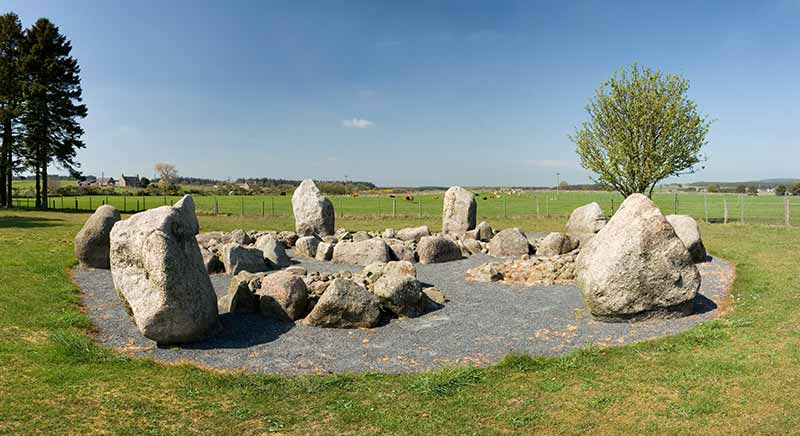
- The stone circle
- Interactive map of Cullerlie stone circle
- 57°07′44″N 2°21′24″W
- Type: Stone circle
- Periods: Neolithic / Bronze Age
- Location: Aberdeenshire, Scotland (grid reference NJ785043)

History
- Built: 2nd millennium BC

Site notes
- Excavation dates: 1934
- Archaeologists: H. E. Kilbride-Jones
- Website: Historic Environment Scotland

Scheduled monument
- Official name: "Cullerlie stone circle", Standing Stones of Echt
- Type: Prehistoric ritual and funerary: kerb cairn; stone circle or ring
- Designated: 31 August 1925
- Reference no.: SM90088

Cullerlie stone circle, also known as the Standing Stones of Echt, is a small stone circle situated near Echt, Aberdeenshire. It consists of eight irregular stones of red granite arranged at approximately equal intervals to form a circle of 10.2 m (33 ft) diameter, enclosing the same number of small cairns. The cairns are characterised by outer kerbs or rings of stones, with a double ring surrounding the central cairn and a single ring in the others. All but one of the cairns have eleven ringstones, with the last having nine. The whole circle sits on a patch of gravel which forms the end of a low gravel ridge linking the site with Leuchar Moss. It is regarded as "a later development from the recumbent stone circle", though its layout with kerbed cairns within the circle makes it unique.

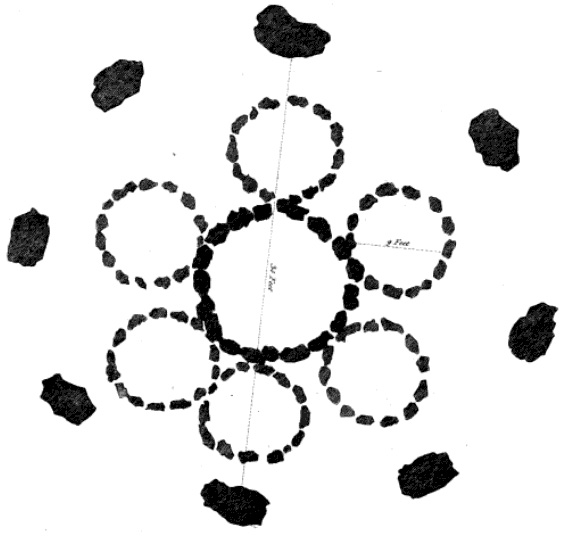
Diagram of the layout of Cullerlie stone circle (Logan, 1820)

At the time that the circle was built in the second millennium BC, the surrounding landscape was characterised by wet bogs, and the stones were transported to the site from higher ground some distance away. The tallest of the stones marks the north side of the circle. They vary in height from 1.09 m (3.6 ft) to 1.80 m (5.9 ft). A 2004 survey of the site discovered that several of the stones had been carved with previously unnoticed cup marks.

Excavations carried out in 1934 by H. E. Kilbride-Jones on behalf of the Ministry of Works, showed that the circle was built in stages. The entire site had first been cleared, leveled and burned by setting fire to piles of willow twigs. Then came the outer stones, with their bases shaped into points to make them more stable in their gravel bed. They have been somewhat eroded over time by acidic peat eating away the lower portions of the stones. Oak and hazel were burned within the stone rings, leaving charcoal behind, and cremated human bones were deposited in the ashes within five of the rings. They were then filled with smaller stones to create the cairns visible today.

The circle may once have had several companions. In 1820 James Logan wrote: "The small Circles contained in the larger present a curious singularity; and it is also remarkable that, at a short distance to the southwest, are nine others of similar dimensions." However, when the site was excavated in 1934, no trace of these satellite circles could be found.
