= Prehistory of France =

Prehistoric France is the period in the human occupation (including early hominins) of the geographical area covered by present-day France which extended through prehistory and ended in the Iron Age with the Roman conquest, when the territory enters the domain of written history.

The Pleistocene is characterized by long glacial periods accompanied by marine regressions, interspersed at more or less regular intervals by milder but shorter interglacial stages. Human populations during this period consisted of nomadic hunter-gatherers. Several human species succeeded each other in the current territory of France until the arrival of modern humans in the Upper Palaeolithic .

The earliest known fossil man is Tautavel Man, dating from 570,000 years ago. Neanderthal Man is attested in France from about 335,000 years before present. Homo sapiens, modern humans, are attested since around 54,000 years ago in the Mandrin Cave.

In the Neolithic, which begins in the south of France in the middle of the 6th millennium BC, the first farmers appeared. The first megaliths were erected in the early 5th millennium BC.

== The Palaeolithic ==
=== Lower Palaeolithic ===
The Lower Paleolithic period began with the first human occupation of the region. Stone tools discovered at Lézignan-la-Cèbe indicate that early humans were present in France from least 1.2 million years ago.

5 prehistoric sites in France are dated from between 1 and 1.2 million years ago:

- the Bois-de-Riquet, in Lézignan-la-Cèbe, in the Hérault (1.2 Ma), discovered in 2008
- the Vallonnet cave, in Roquebrune-Cap-Martin, in the Alpes-Maritimes (1.15 Ma), discovered in 1958
- Terre-des-Sablons, in Lunery-Rosières, in Cher (1.15 Ma),
- Pont-de-Lavaud, at Éguzon-Chantôme, in Indre (1.05 Ma),
- Pont-de-la-Hulauderie, in Saint-Hilaire-la-Gravelle, in Loir-et-Cher (1 My).

None of these sites have thus far revealed any evidence of lithic industry which prevents identification of the human species responsible for them.

France includes Olduwan (Abbevillian) and Acheulean sites from early or non-modern (transitional) Hominini species, most notably Homo erectus and Homo heidelbergensis. Tooth Arago 149 - 560,000 years. Tautavel Man (Homo erectus tautavelensis), is a proposed subspecies of the hominid Homo erectus, the 450,000-year-old fossil remains of whom were discovered in the Arago cave in Tautavel.

The Grotte du Vallonnet near Menton contained simple stone tools dating to 1 million to 1.05 million years BC. Cave sites were exploited for habitation, but the hunter-gatherers of the Palaeolithic era also possibly built shelters such as those identified in connection with Acheulean tools at Grotte du Lazaret and Terra Amata near Nice in France. Excavations at Terra Amata found traces of the earliest known domestication of fire in Europe, from 400,000 BC.

=== Middle Palaeolithic ===
The Neanderthals are thought to have arrived earlier than 300,000 BC, (Note: The oldest known Neanderthal fossil in France was found in 1998 in the cave of Pradayrol, in Caniac-du-Causse, in Lot-et-Garonne. A Neanderthal incisor has been dated there to 335,000 years.) but seem to have died out by about by 30,000 BC, presumably unable to compete with modern humans during a period of cold weather. Numerous Neanderthal, or "Mousterian", artifacts (named after the type site of Le Moustier, a rock shelter in the Dordogne region of France) have been found from this period, some using the "Levallois technique", a distinctive type of flint knapping developed by hominids during the Lower Palaeolithic but most commonly associated with the Neanderthal industries of the Middle Palaeolithic. Importantly, recent findings suggest that Neanderthals and modern humans may have interbred.

Important Mousterian sites are found at:

- Fieux, in Lot-et-Garonne (340 ka)
- Petit-Bost, in the Dordogne (325 ka)

The first identified Neanderthal burials were discovered at La Chapelle-aux-Saints in 1908 (dating from 70 ka) then at La Ferrassie in 1909. The identification of burial practices in Neanderthals at these sites led to new insights concerning the capacity of Neanderthals to develop spiritual or metaphysical beliefs, extending understanding of the human species beyond what had been hitherto assumed.

=== Upper Palaeolithic ===
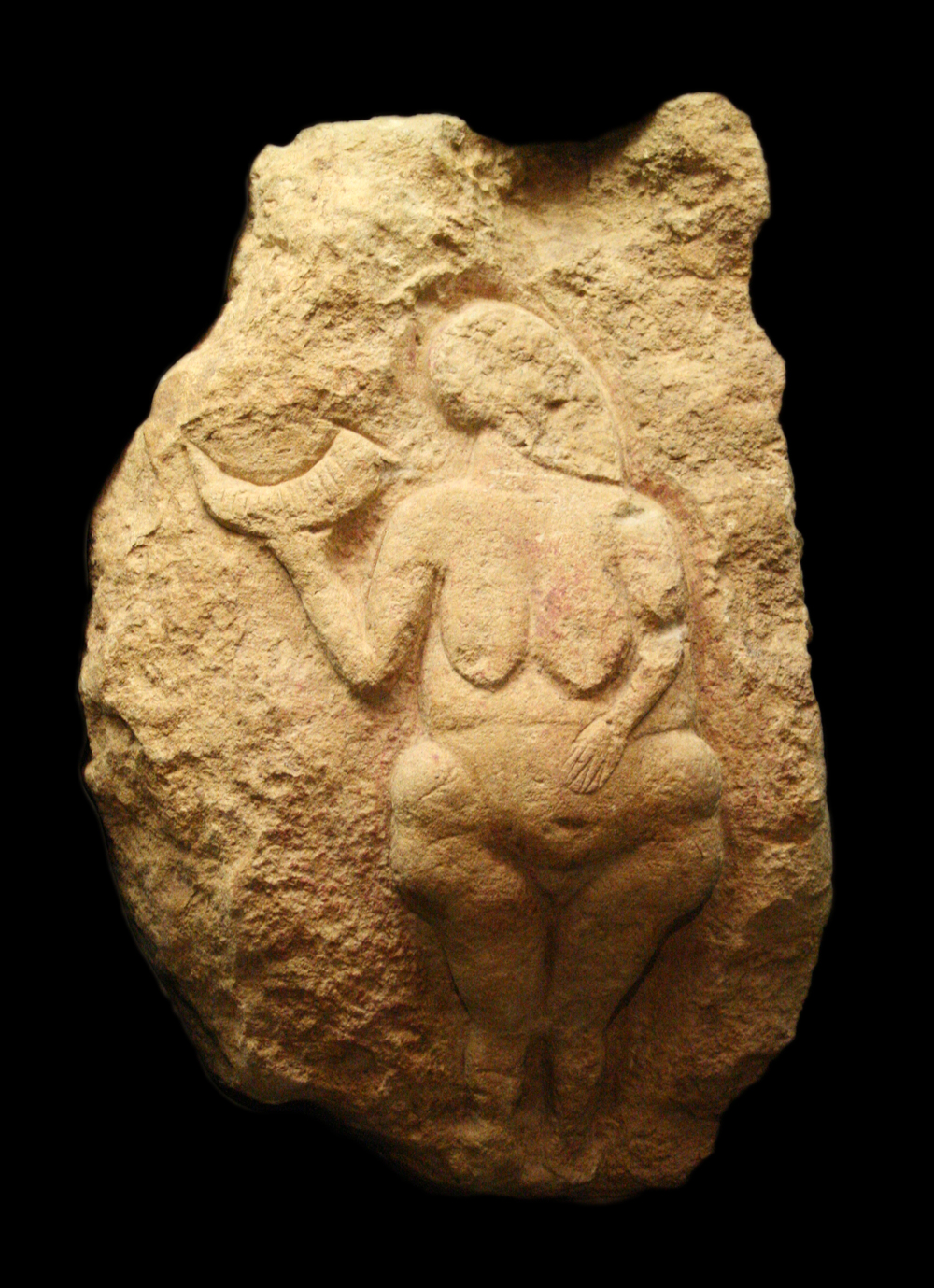
Venus of Laussel, Gravettian culture, c. 23,000 BC

The earliest indication of Upper Palaeolithic early modern human (formerly referred to as Cro-Magnon) migration into France, and indeed in the whole of Europe, is a series of modern human teeth with Neronian industry stone tools found at the Mandrin Cave, Malataverne in France, dated in 2022 to between 56,800 and 51,700 years ago. The Neronian is one of the many industries associated with modern humans classed as transitional between the Middle and Upper Palaeolithic. When they arrived in Europe, they brought with them sculpture, engraving, painting, body ornamentation, music and the painstaking decoration of utilitarian objects. Some of the oldest works of art in the world, such as the cave paintings at Lascaux in southern France, are datable to shortly after this migration.

European Palaeolithic cultures are divided into several chronological subgroups (the names are all based on French type sites, principally in the Dordogne region):

- Aurignacian (c. 38,000 - 23,000 BP) – responsible for Venus figurines, cave paintings at the Chauvet Cave (continued during the Gravettian period).
- Périgordian (c. 35,000 - 20,000 BP) – use of this term is being debated (the term implies that the following subperiods represent a continuous tradition).
  - Châtelperronian (c. 39,000 - 29,000 BP) – culture derived from the earlier, Neanderthal, Mousterian industry as it made use of Levallois cores and represents the period when Neanderthals and modern humans occupied Europe together.
  - Gravettian (c. 28,000 - 22,000 BP) – responsible for Venus figurines, cave paintings at the Cosquer Cave.
- Solutrean (c. 22,000 - 17,000 BP)
- Magdalenian (c. 17,000 - 10,000 BP) – thought to be responsible for the cave paintings at Pech Merle (in the Lot in Languedoc, dating back to 16,000 BC), Lascaux (located near the village of Montignac, in the Dordogne, dating back to somewhere between 13,000 and 15,000 BC, and perhaps as far back as 25,000 BC), the Trois-Frères cave and the Rouffignac Cave also known as The Cave of the hundred mammoths. It possesses the most extensive cave system of the Périgord in France with more than 8 kilometers of underground passageways.
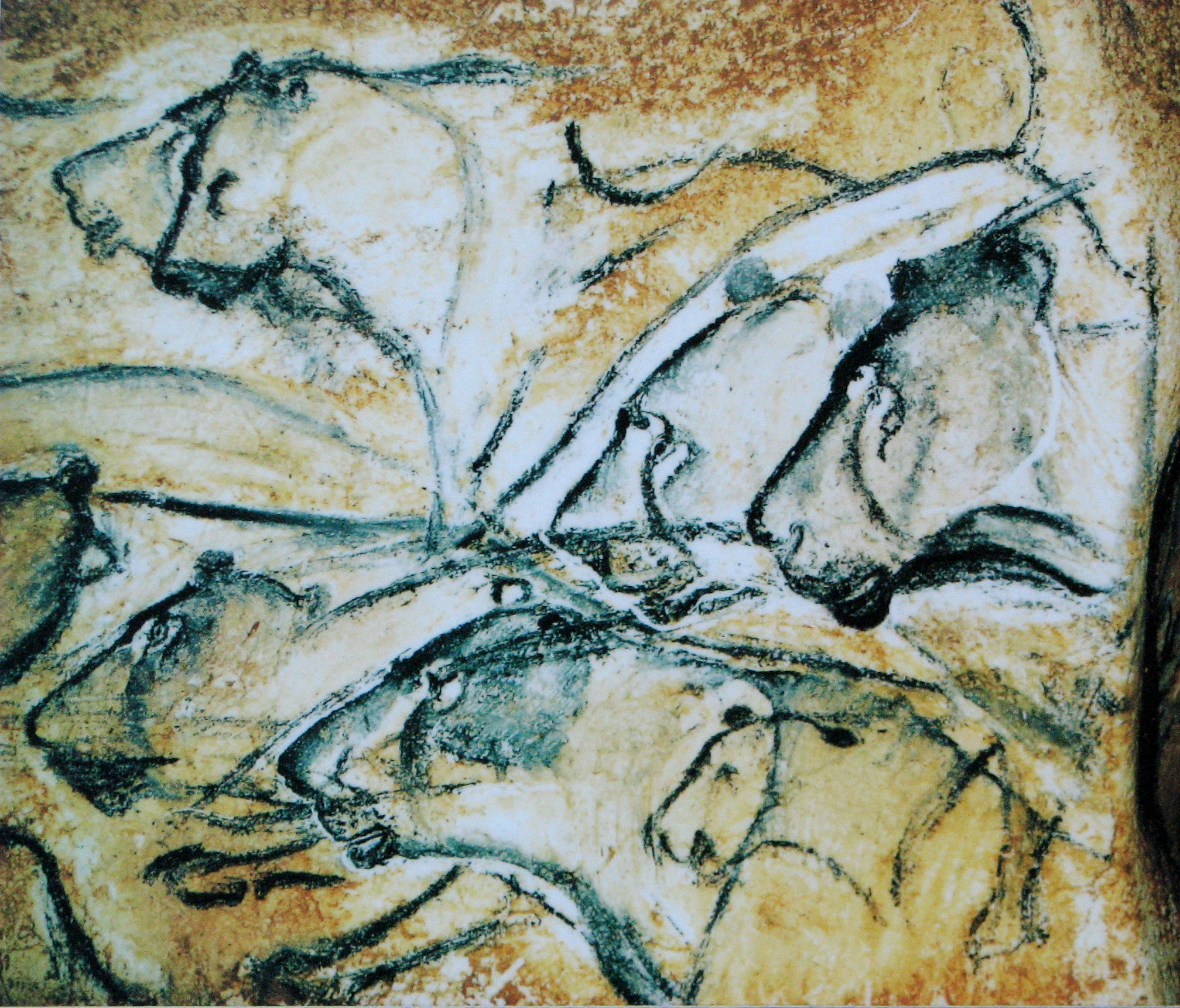
Chauvet cave painting, Aurignacian culture

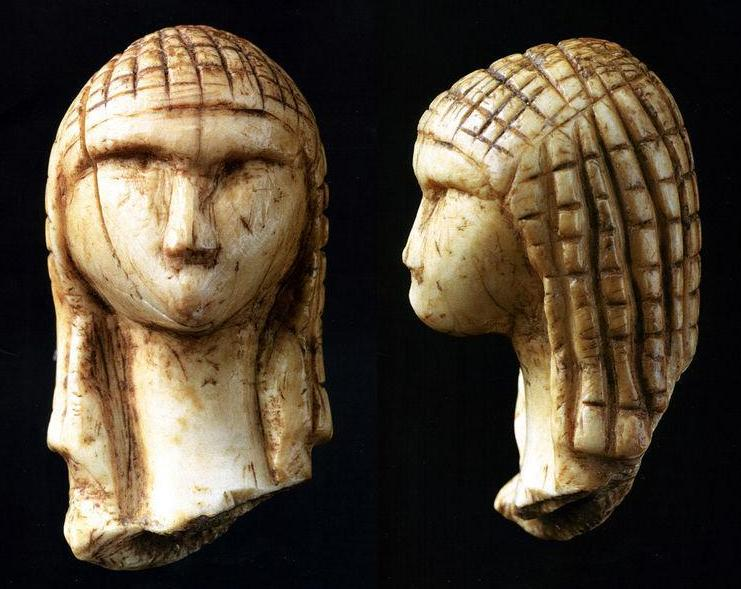
Venus of Brassempouy, Gravettian culture

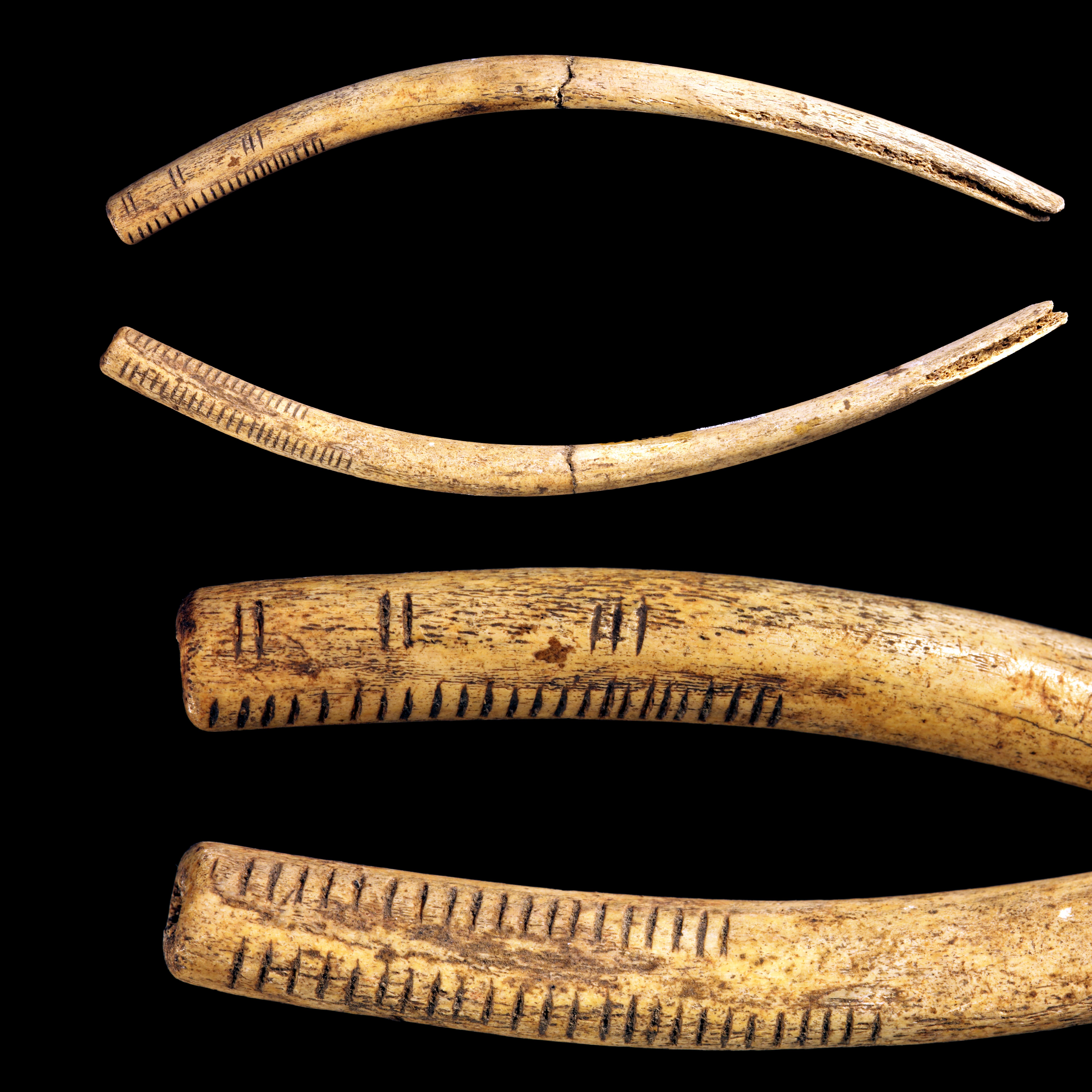
Inscribed bones, Gravettian culture

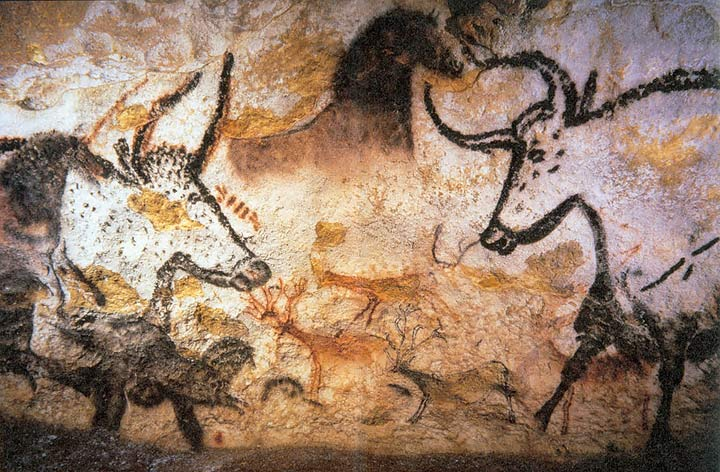
Lascaux cave painting, Magdalenian culture

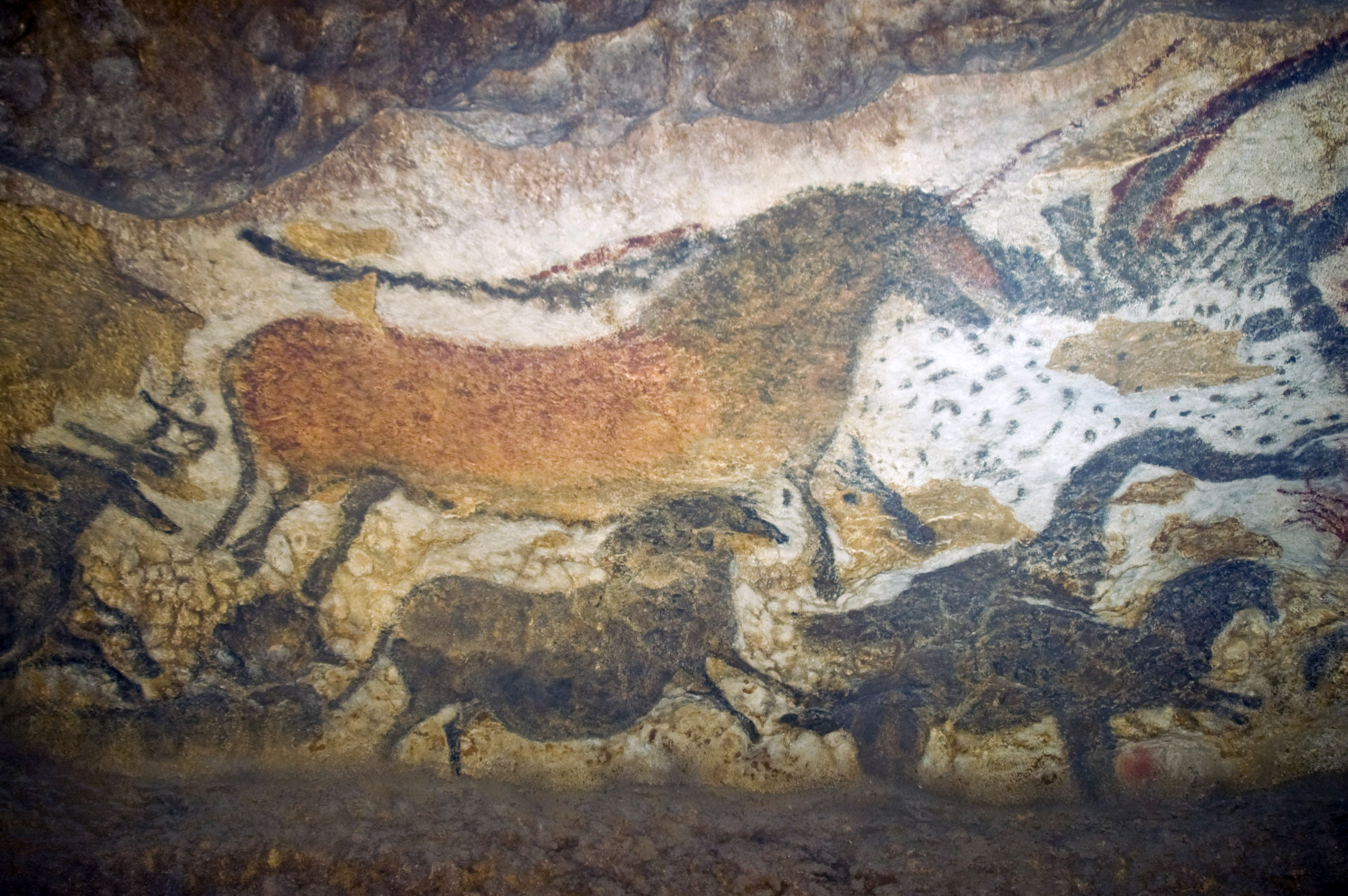
Lascaux cave painting, Magdalenian culture

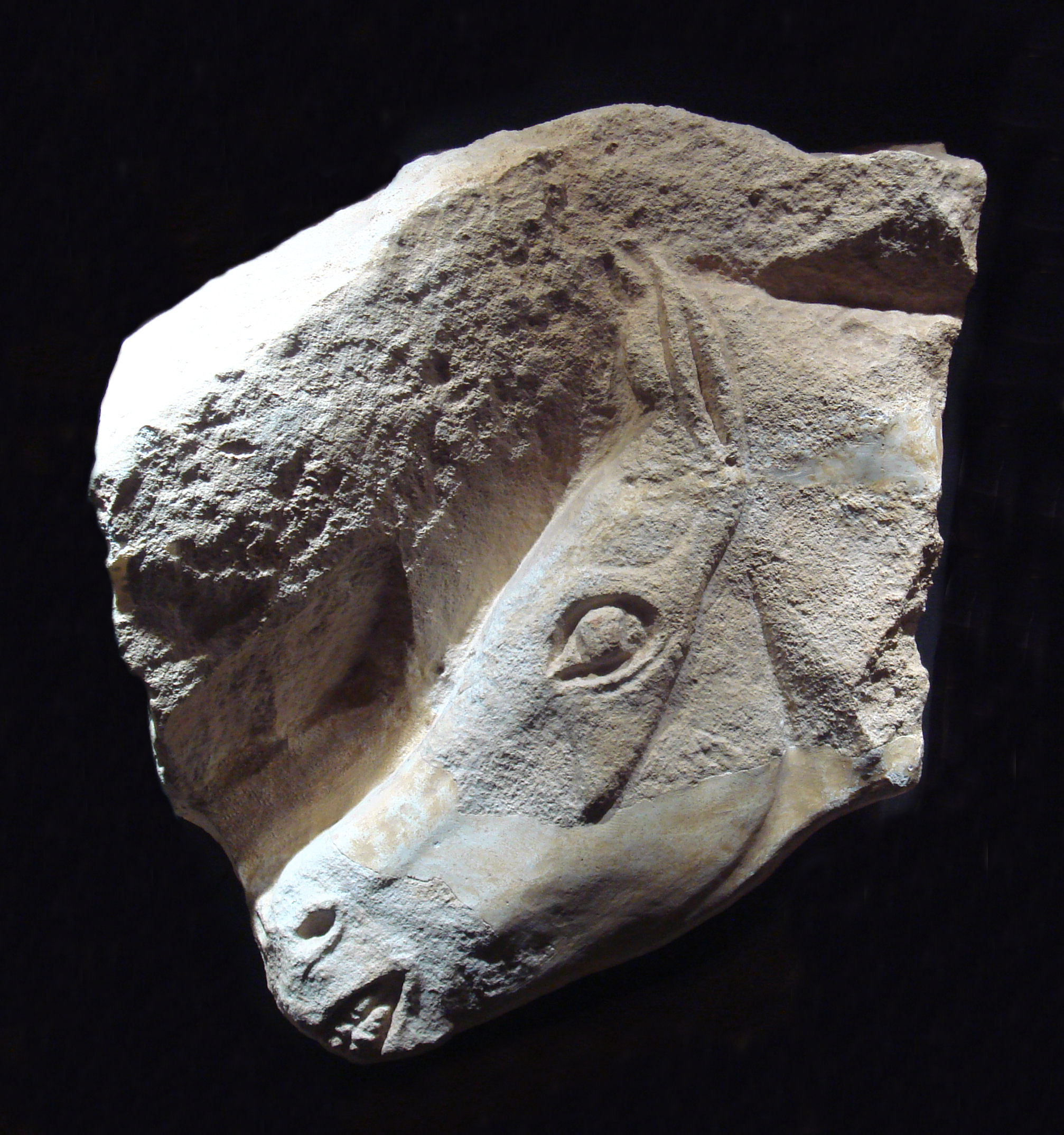
Stone engraving, Magdalenian culture

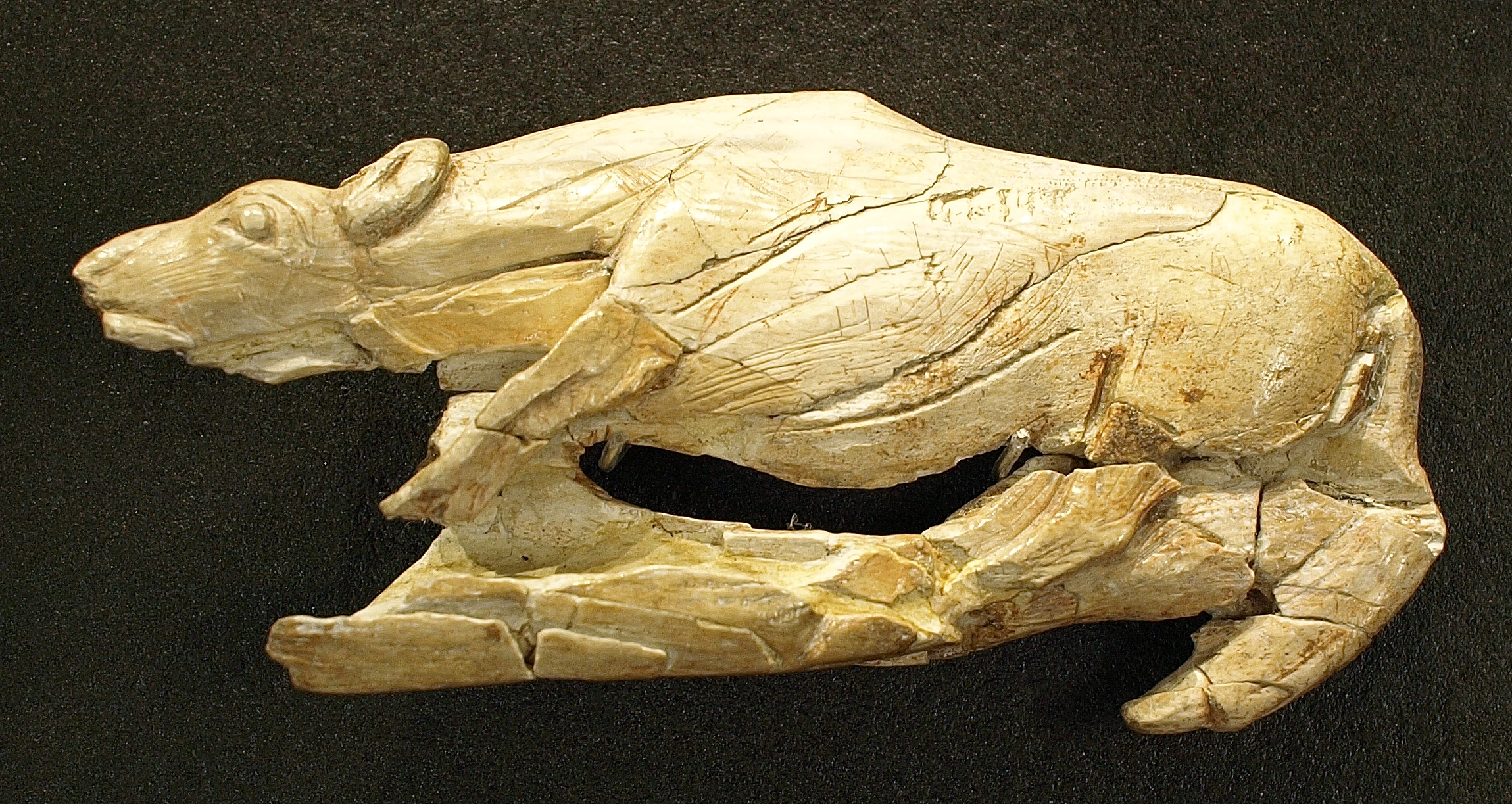
Bone sculpture, Magdalenian culture

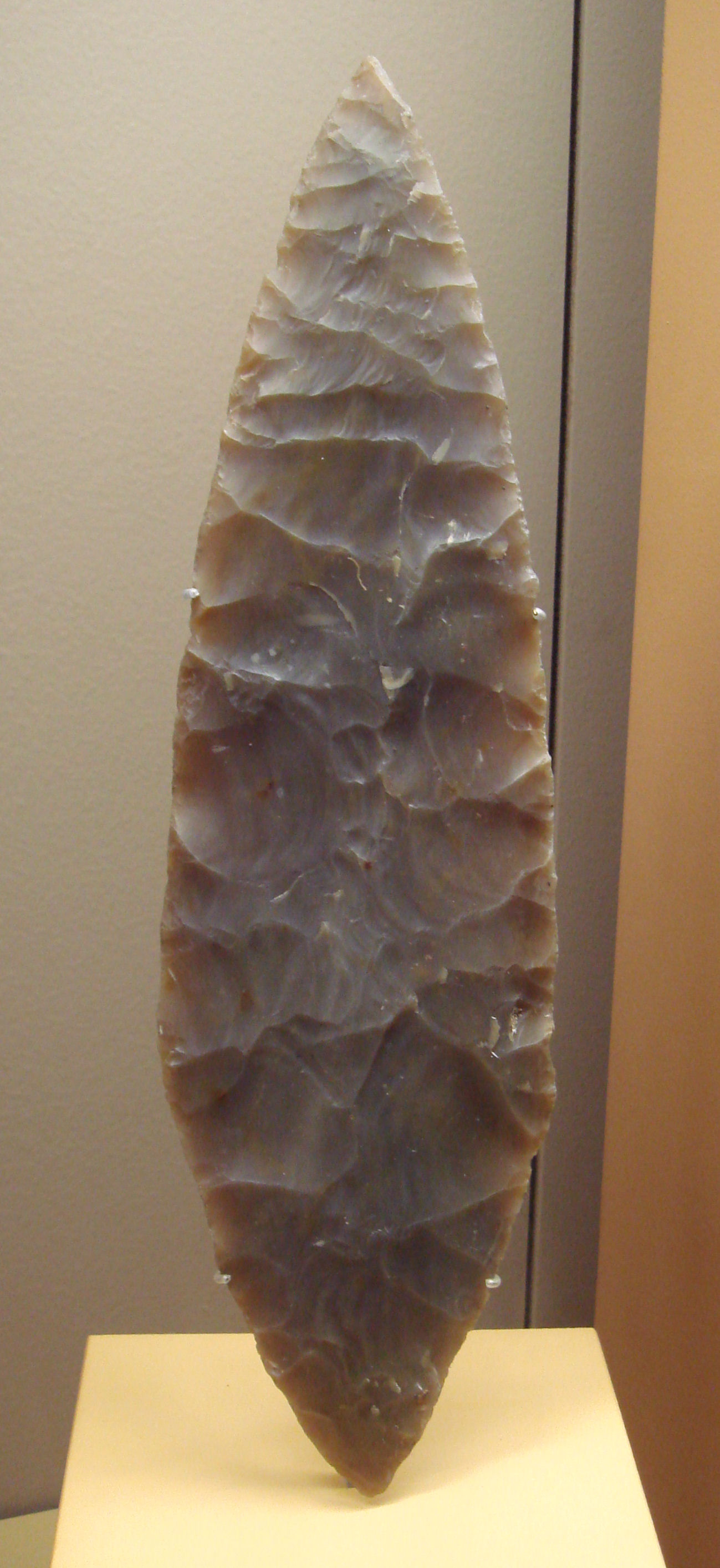
Large biface, Solutrean culture

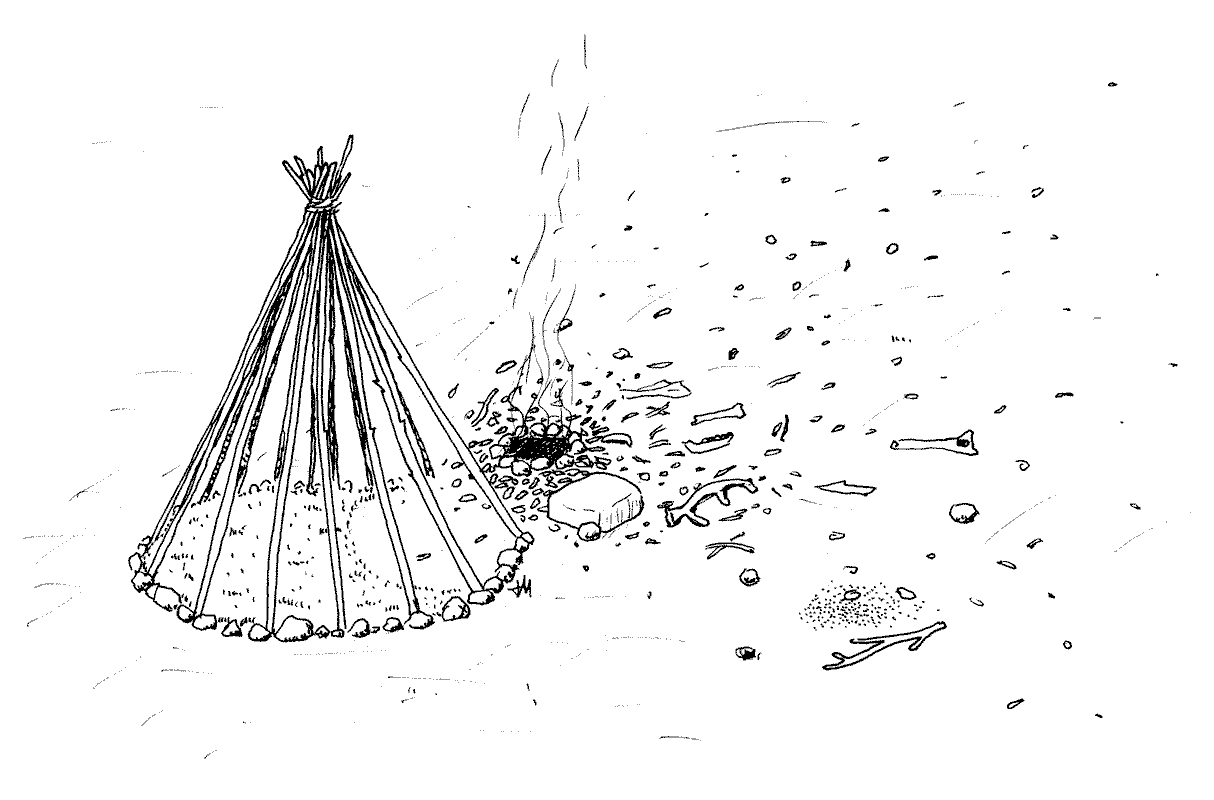
Magdalenian tent, 12,000 BP

== The Mesolithic ==
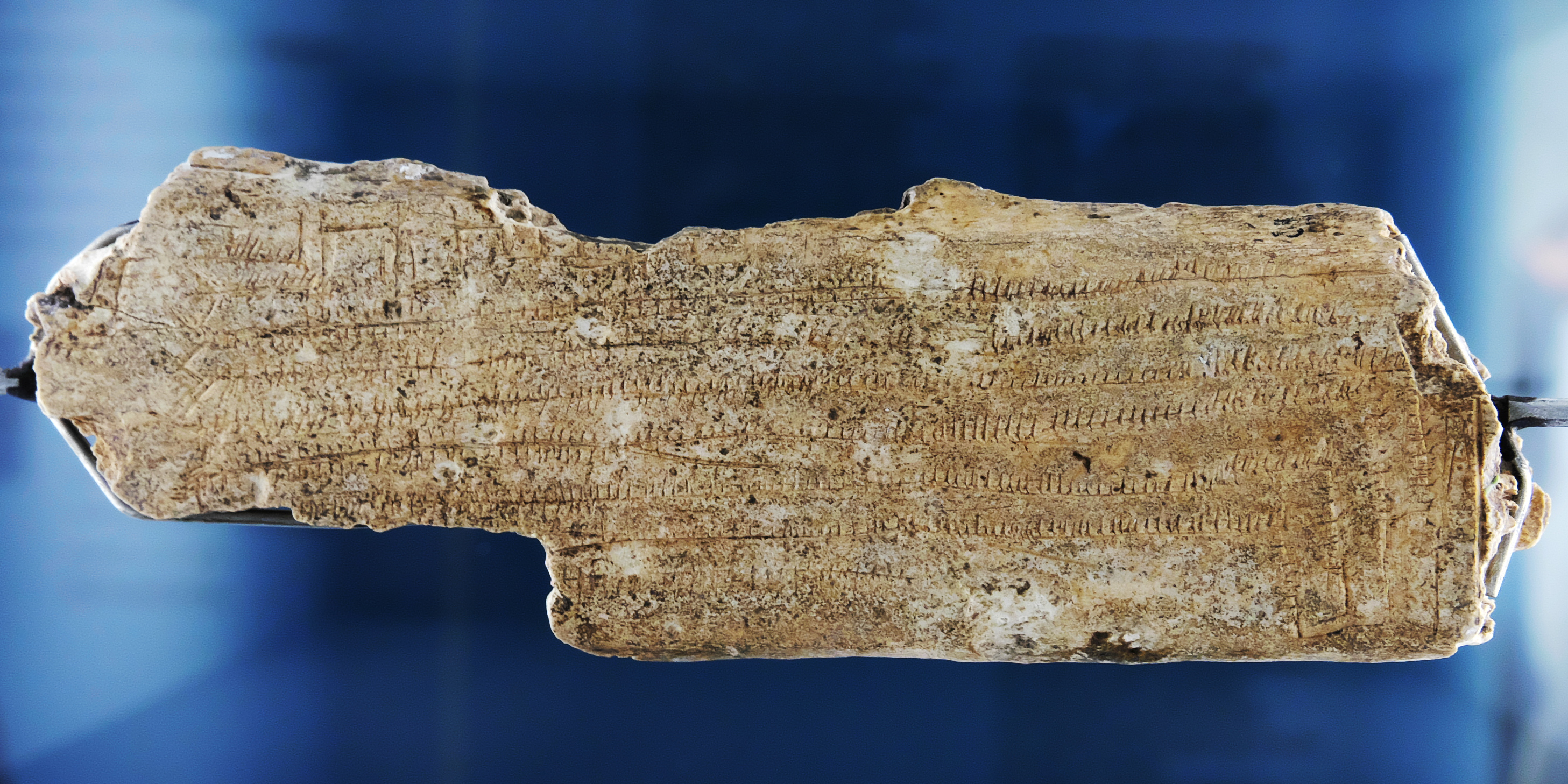
Thaïs bone, Azilian culture, c. 10,000 BC. (Note: The engraving on the Thaïs bone is a non-decorative notational system of considerable complexity. The cumulative nature of the markings together with their numerical arrangement and various other characteristics strongly suggest that the notational sequence on the main face represents a non-arithmetical record of day-by-day lunar and solar observations undertaken over a time period of as much as 3½ years. The markings appear to record the changing appearance of the moon, and in particular its crescent phases and times of invisibility, and the shape of the overall pattern suggests that the sequence was kept in step with the seasons by observations of the solstices. The latter implies that people in the Azilian period were not only aware of the changing appearance of the moon but also of the changing position of the sun, and capable of synchronizing the two. The markings on the Thaïs bone represent the most complex and elaborate time-factored sequence currently known within the corpus of Palaeolithic mobile art. The artefact demonstrates the existence, within Upper Palaeolithic (Azilian) cultures c. 12,000 years ago, of a system of time reckoning based upon observations of the phase cycle of the moon, with the inclusion of a seasonal time factor provided by observations of the solar solstices.)

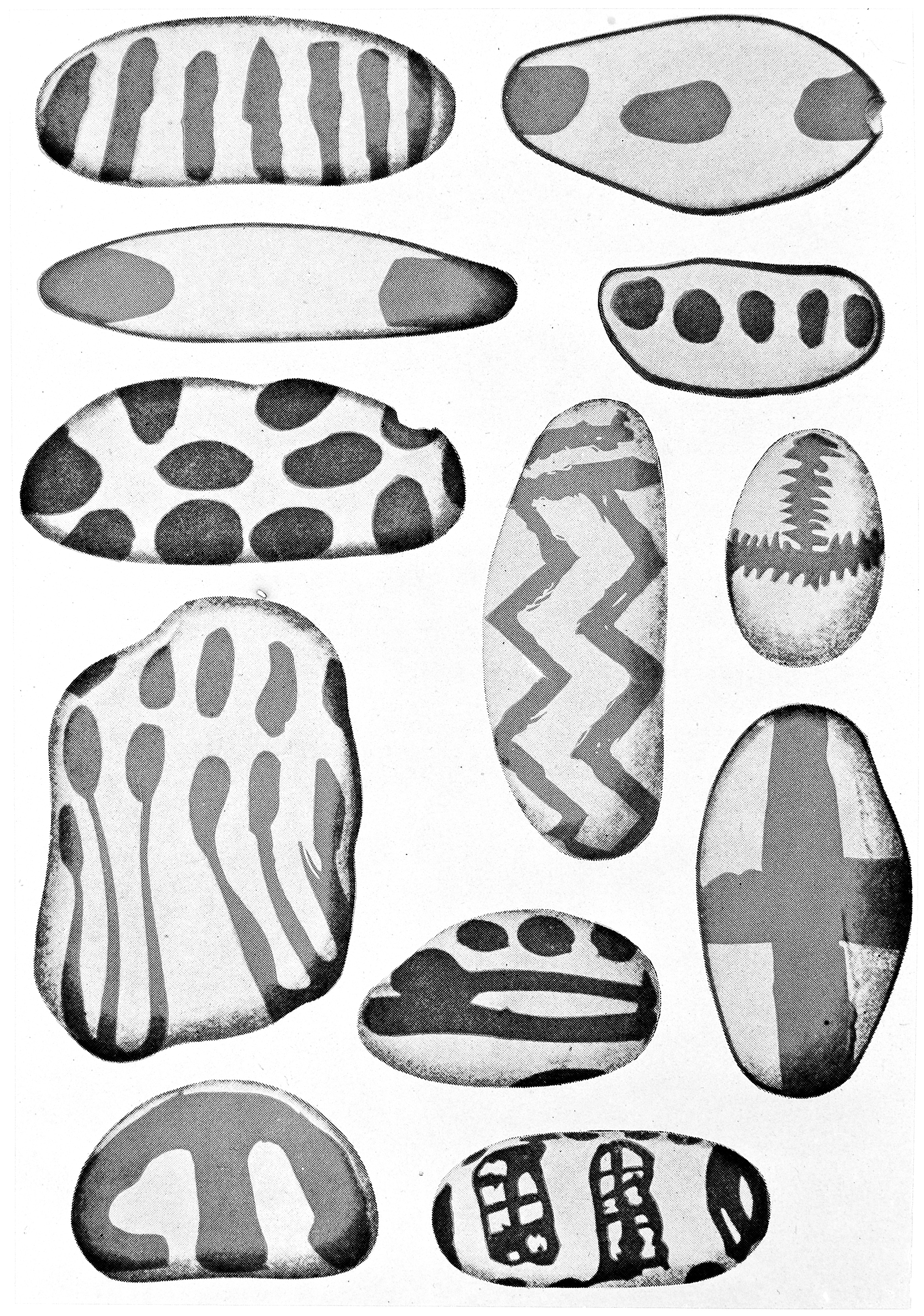
Painted pebbles, Azilian culture

From the Paleolithic to the Mesolithic, the Magdalenian culture evolved. The Early Mesolithic, or Azilian, began about 14,000 years ago, in the Franco-Cantabrian region of northern Spain and Southern France. This was ahead of other parts of Western Europe, where the Mesolithic began by 11,500 years ago at the beginning of the Holocene. It ended with the introduction of farming.

The Azilian culture of the Late Glacial Maximum co-existed with similar early Mesolithic European cultures such as the Tjongerian of North-Western Europe, the Ahrensburgian of Northern Europe and the Swiderian of North-Eastern Europe, all succeeding the Federmesser complex. The Azilian culture was followed by the Sauveterrian in Southern France and Switzerland, the Tardenoisian in Northern France, the Maglemosian in Northern Europe.

Archeologists are unsure whether Western Europe saw a Mesolithic immigration. Populations speaking non-Indo-European languages are obvious candidates for Mesolithic remnants. The Vascons (Basques) of the Pyrenees present the strongest case, since their language is related to none other in the world, and the Basque population has a distinct genetic profile. The disappearance of Doggerland affected the surrounding territories and the hunter gatherers living there are believed to have migrated to northern France and as far as eastern Ireland to escape from the floods.

== The Neolithic ==
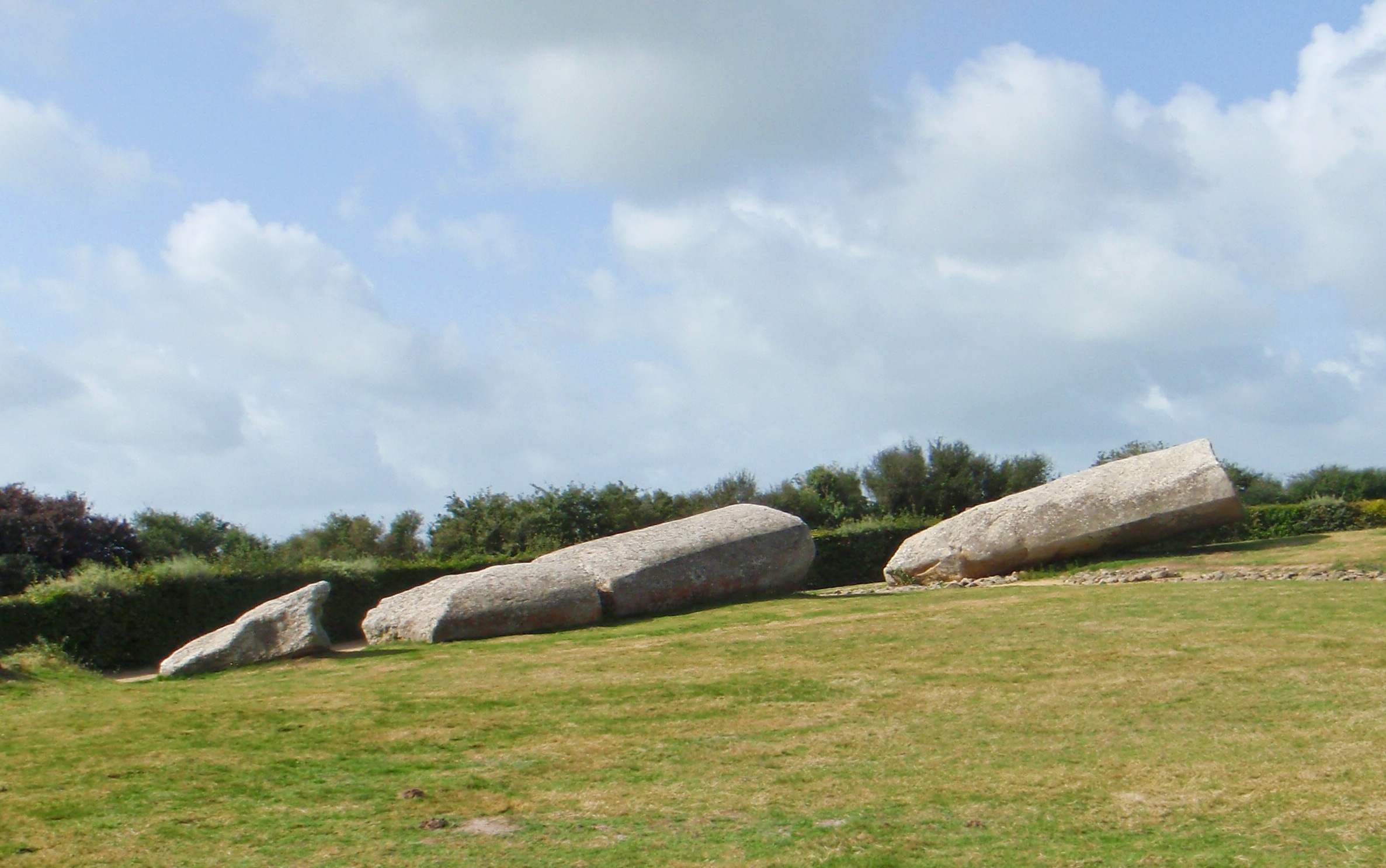
The Broken Menhir of Er Grah, 4500 BC. Originally 20.6m in height

The Neolithic period lasted in northern Europe for approximately 3,000 years (c. 5000 BC–2000 BC). It is characterised by the so-called Neolithic Revolution, a transitional period that included the adoption of agriculture, the development of tools and pottery (Cardium pottery, LBK), and the growth of larger, more complex settlements. There was an expansion of peoples from southwest Asia into Europe; this diffusion across Europe, from the Aegean to Britain, took about 2,500 years (6500 BC–4000 BC). According to the leading Kurgan hypothesis, Indo-European languages were introduced to Europe later, during the succeeding Bronze Age, and Neolithic peoples in Europe are called "Pre-Indo-Europeans" or "Old Europe". Nevertheless, some archaeologists believe that the Neolithic expansion, and the eclipse of Mesolithic culture, coincided with the introduction of Indo-European speakers. In what is known as the Anatolian hypothesis, it is postulated that Indo-European languages arrived in the early Neolithic. Old European hydronymy is taken by Hans Krahe to be the oldest reflection of the early presence of Indo-European languages in Europe.

Many European Neolithic groups share basic characteristics, such as living in small-scale family-based communities, subsisting on domestic plants and animals supplemented with the collection of wild plant foods and with hunting, and producing hand-made pottery (that is made without the potter's wheel). Archeological sites from the Neolithic in France include artifacts from the Linear Pottery culture (c. 5500 – c. 4500 BC), the Rössen culture (c. 4500—4000 BC), and the Chasséen culture (4,500 - 3,500 BC; named after Chassey-le-Camp in Saône-et-Loire), the name given to the late Neolithic pre-Beaker culture that spread throughout the plains and plateaux of France, including the Seine basin and the upper Loire valleys.

The 'Armorican' (Castellic culture) and Northern French Neolithic (Cerny culture) is based on traditions of the Linear Pottery culture or "Limburg pottery" in association with the La Hoguette/Cardial culture. The Armorican culture may also have origins in the Mesolithic tradition of Téviec and Hoedic in Brittany.

It is most likely from the Neolithic that date the megalithic (large stone) monuments, such as the dolmens, menhirs, stone circles and chamber tombs, found throughout France, the largest selection of which are in the Brittany and Auvergne regions. The most famous of these are the Carnac stones (c. 3300 BC, but may date to as old as 4500 BC) and the stones at Saint-Sulpice-de-Faleyrens.

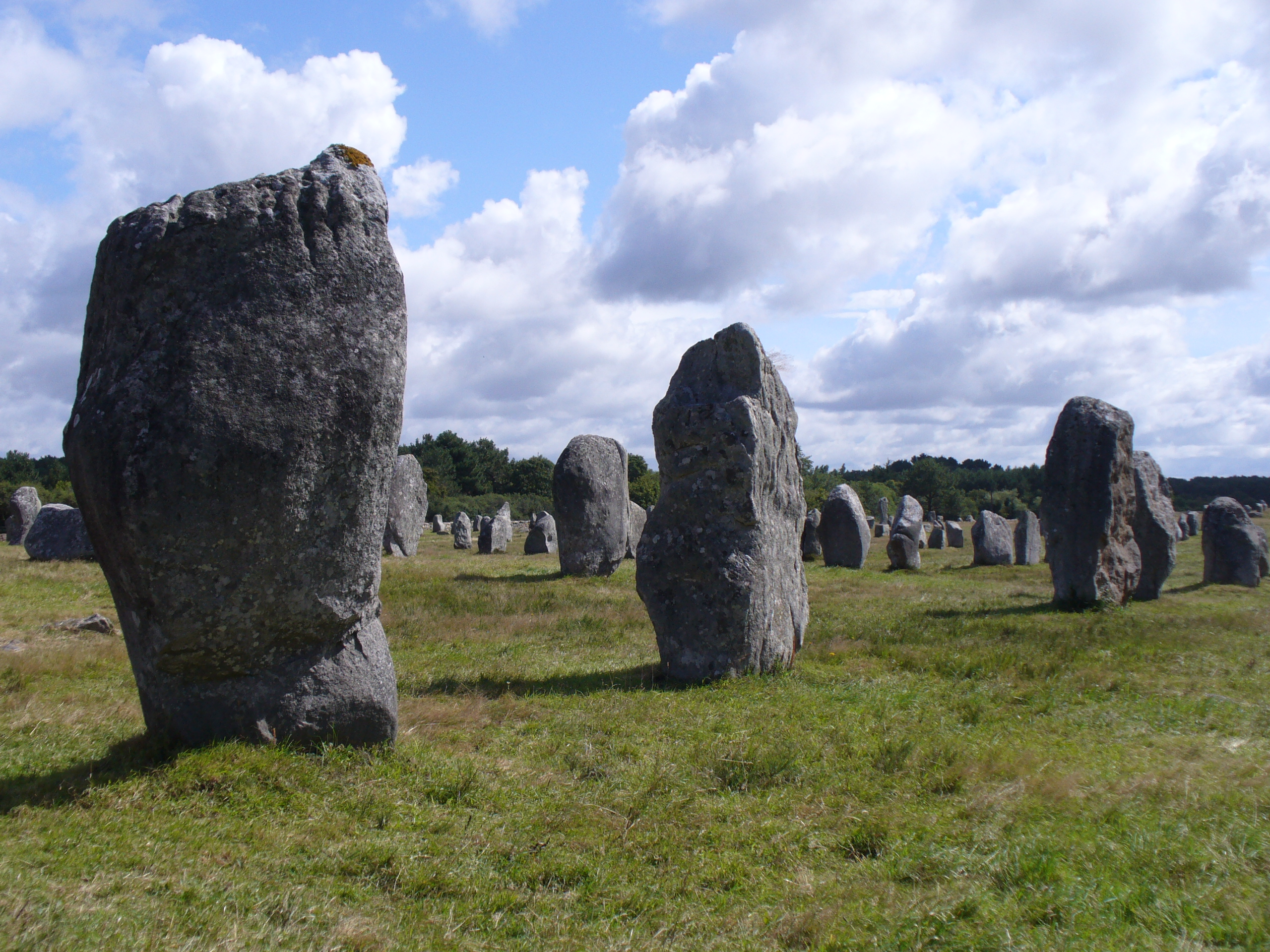
Le Menec alignments, Carnac, 4500–3300 BC

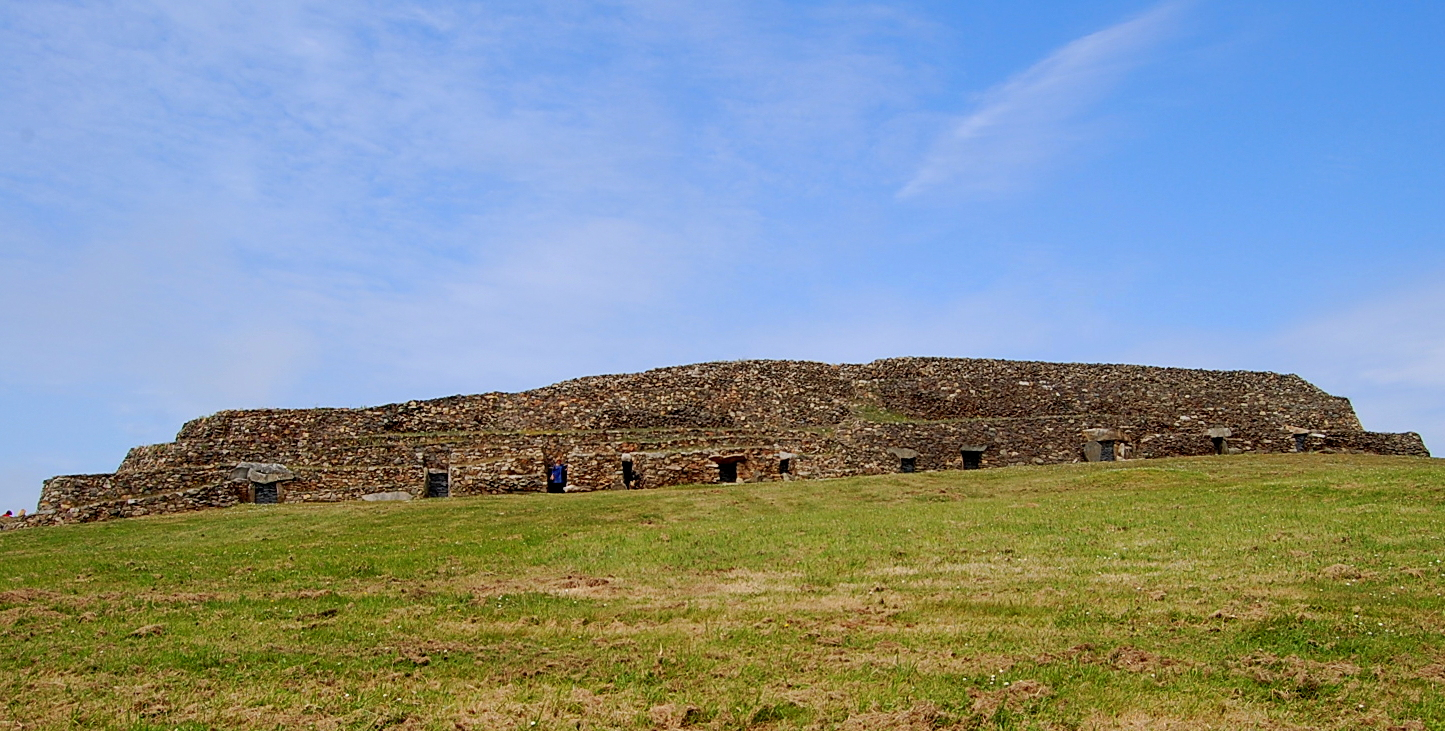
Cairn of Barnenez, Brittany, c. 4800 BC

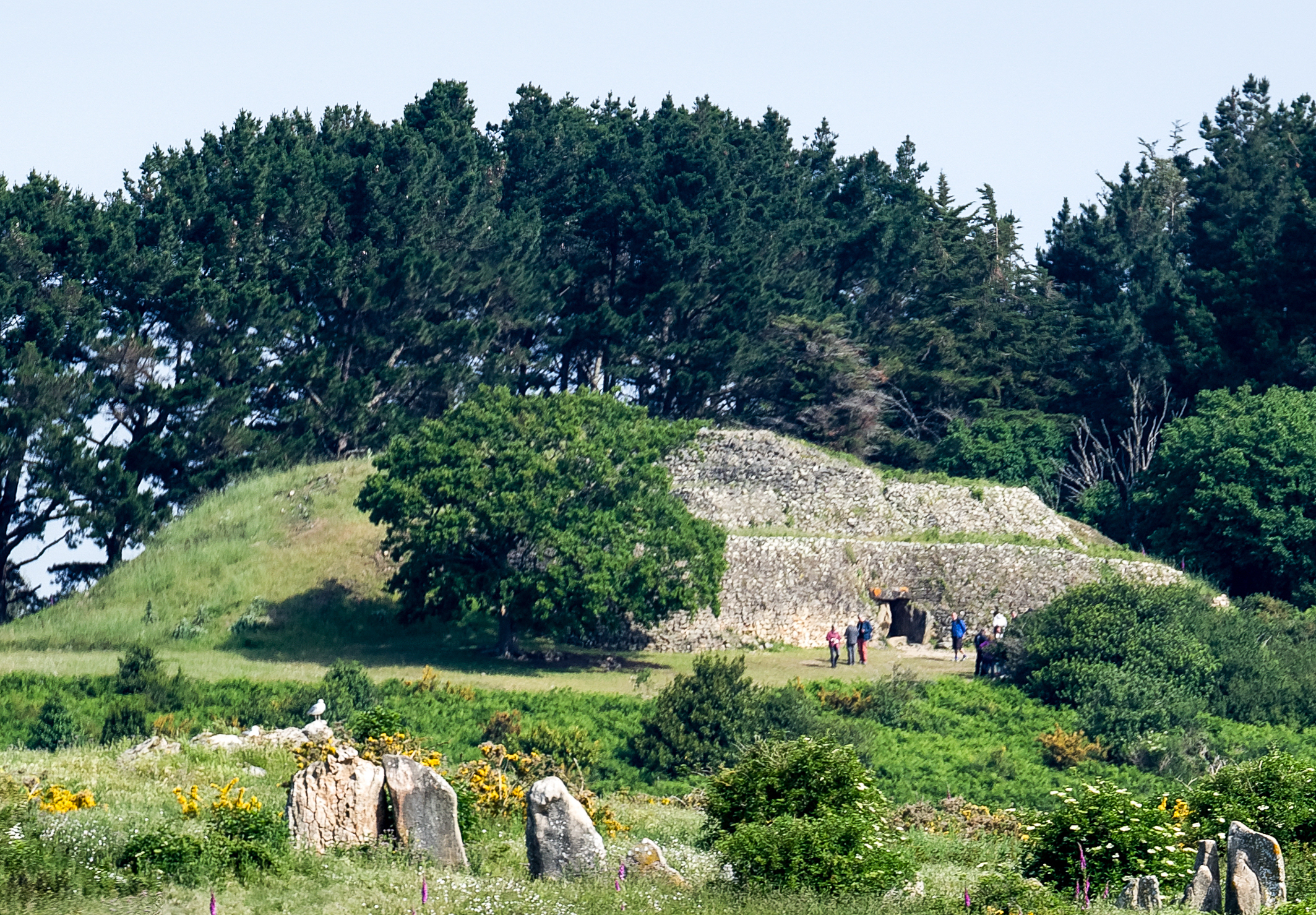
Gavrinis passage grave, Brittany, c. 4200 BC.

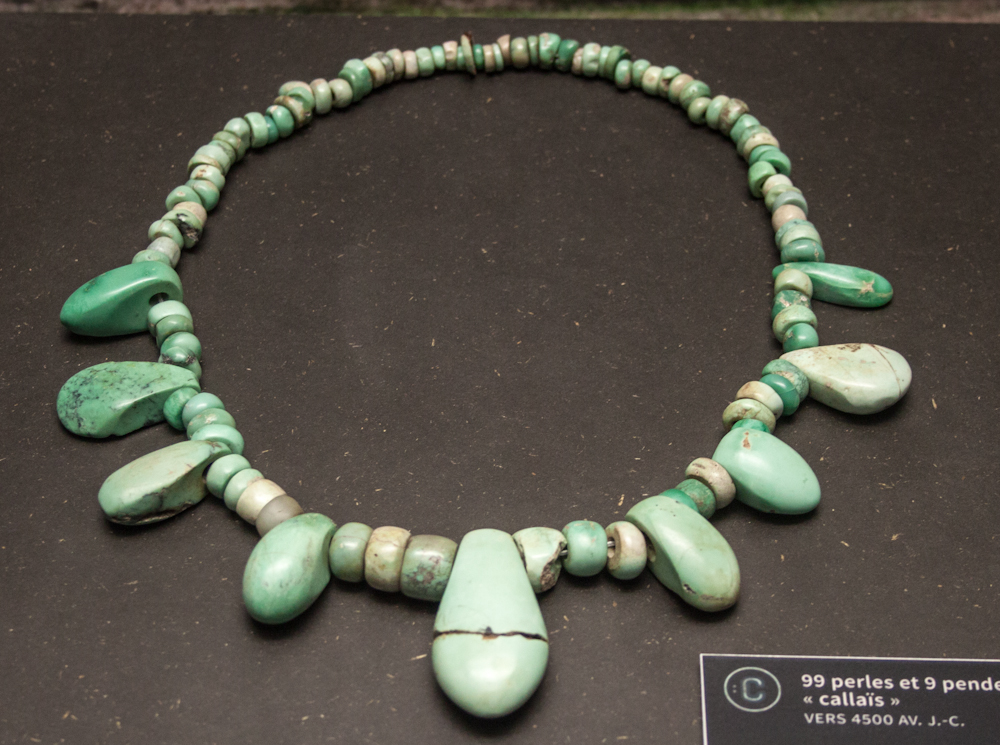
Turquoise necklace, Carnac, 4500 BC

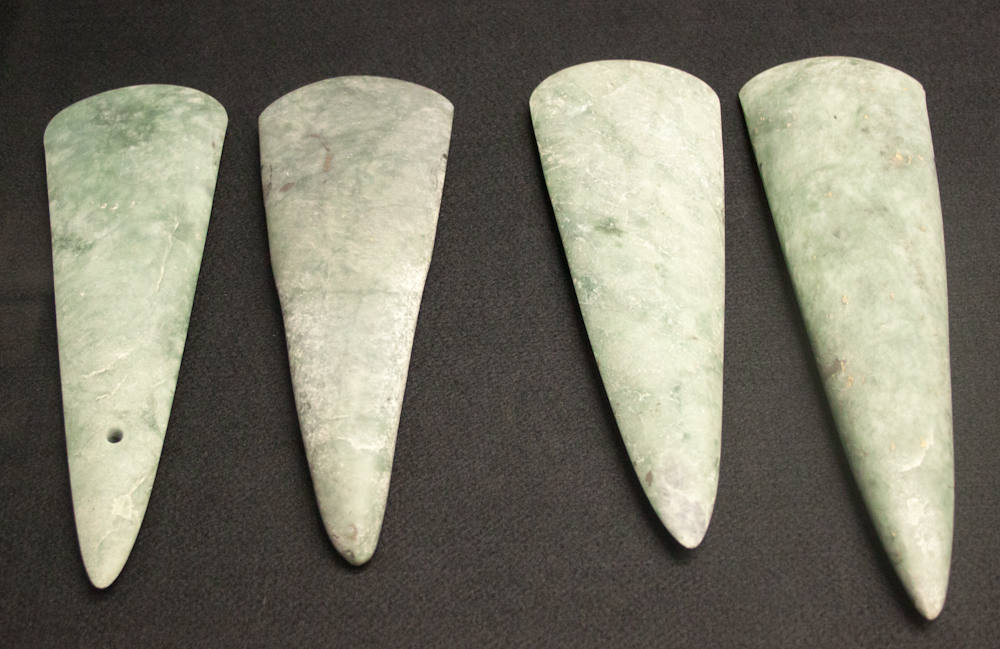
Polished jade axes, Carnac, c. 4500 BC

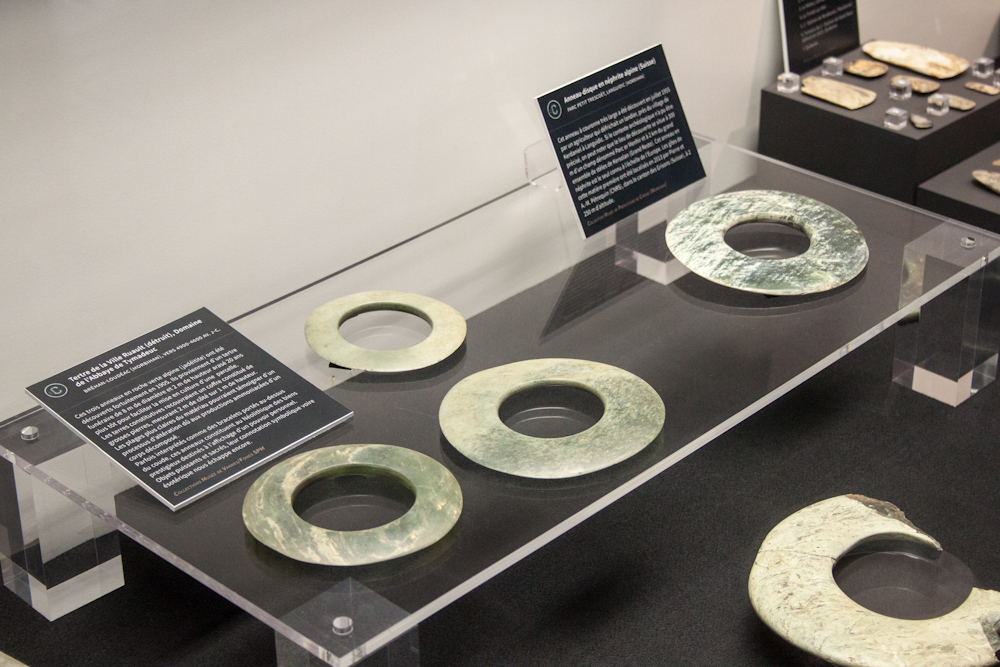
Polished jade rings, Carnac, c. 4500 BC

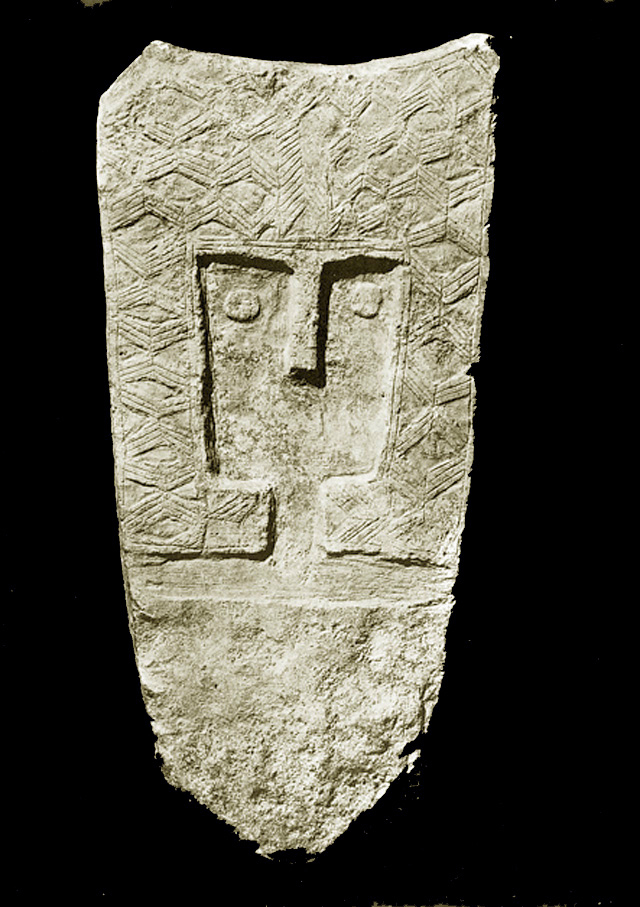
Stele, Chasséen culture, 4th millennium BC. (Note: Provence stelae with chevron ornamentation are relatively well dated. They have always been dated to the Middle Neolithic, and more exactly to the Late Chasséen.)

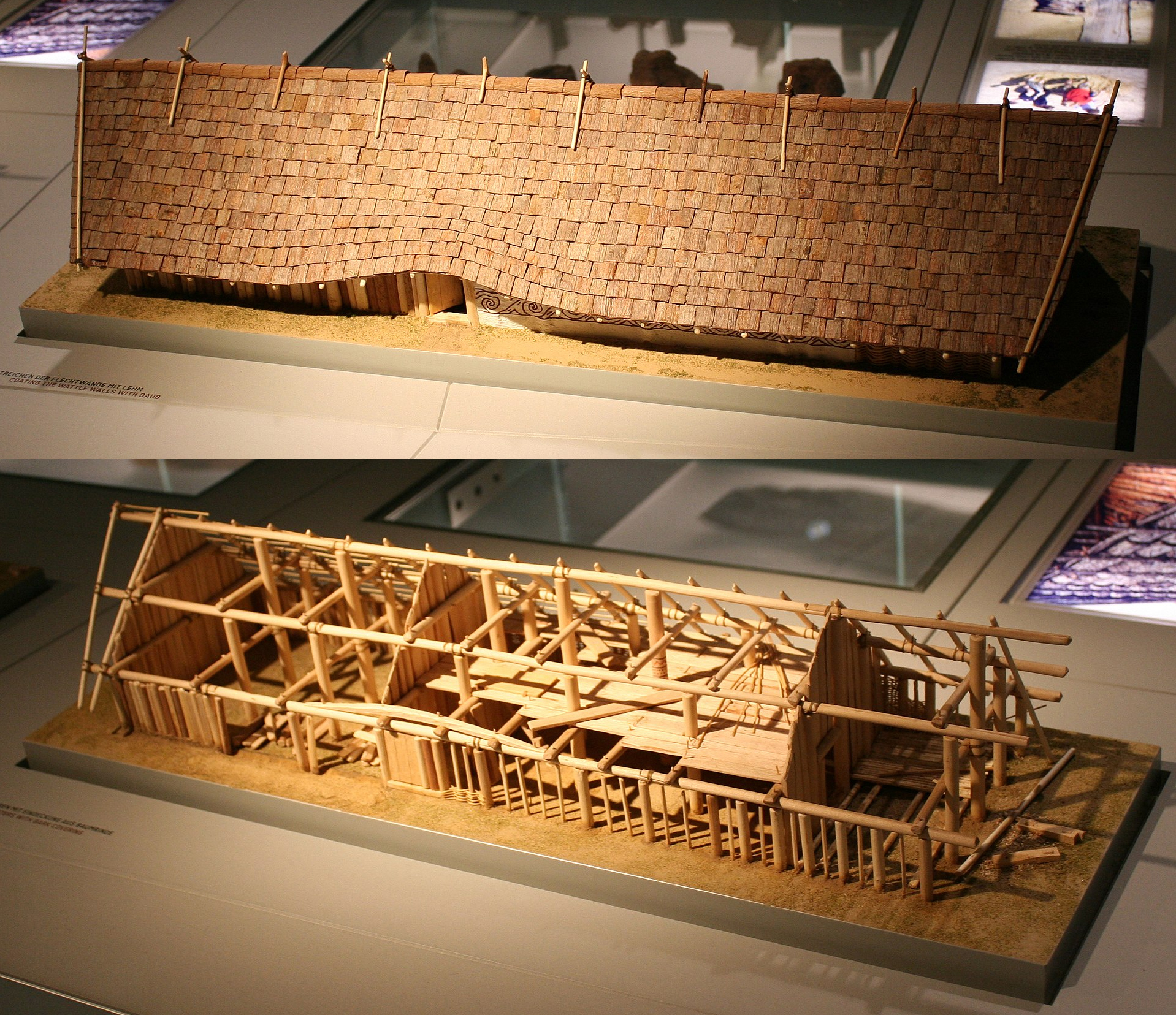
Linear Pottery culture longhouse, c. 5000 BC

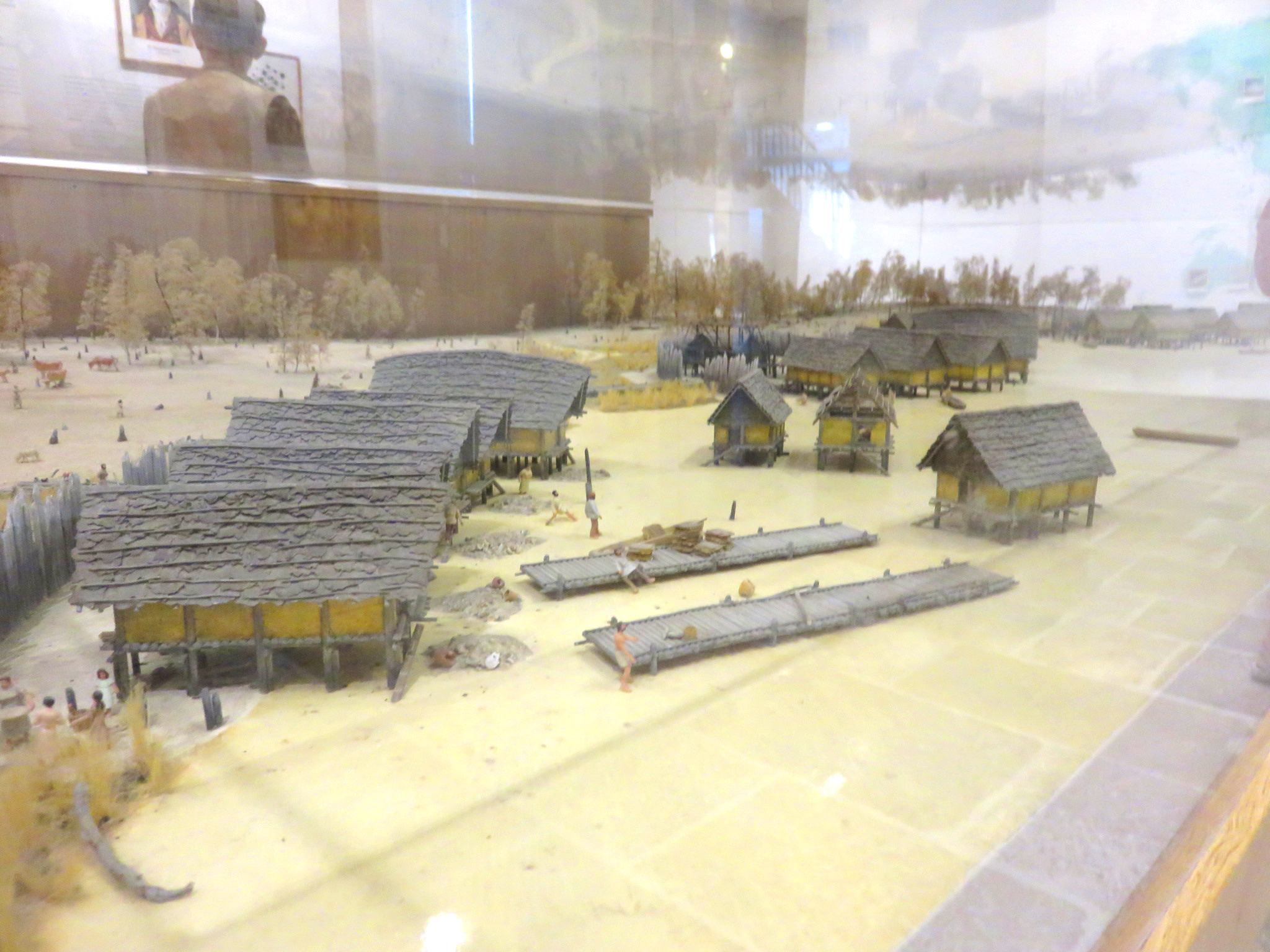
Neolithic lake settlement at Clairvaux-les-Lacs, c. 4000 BC

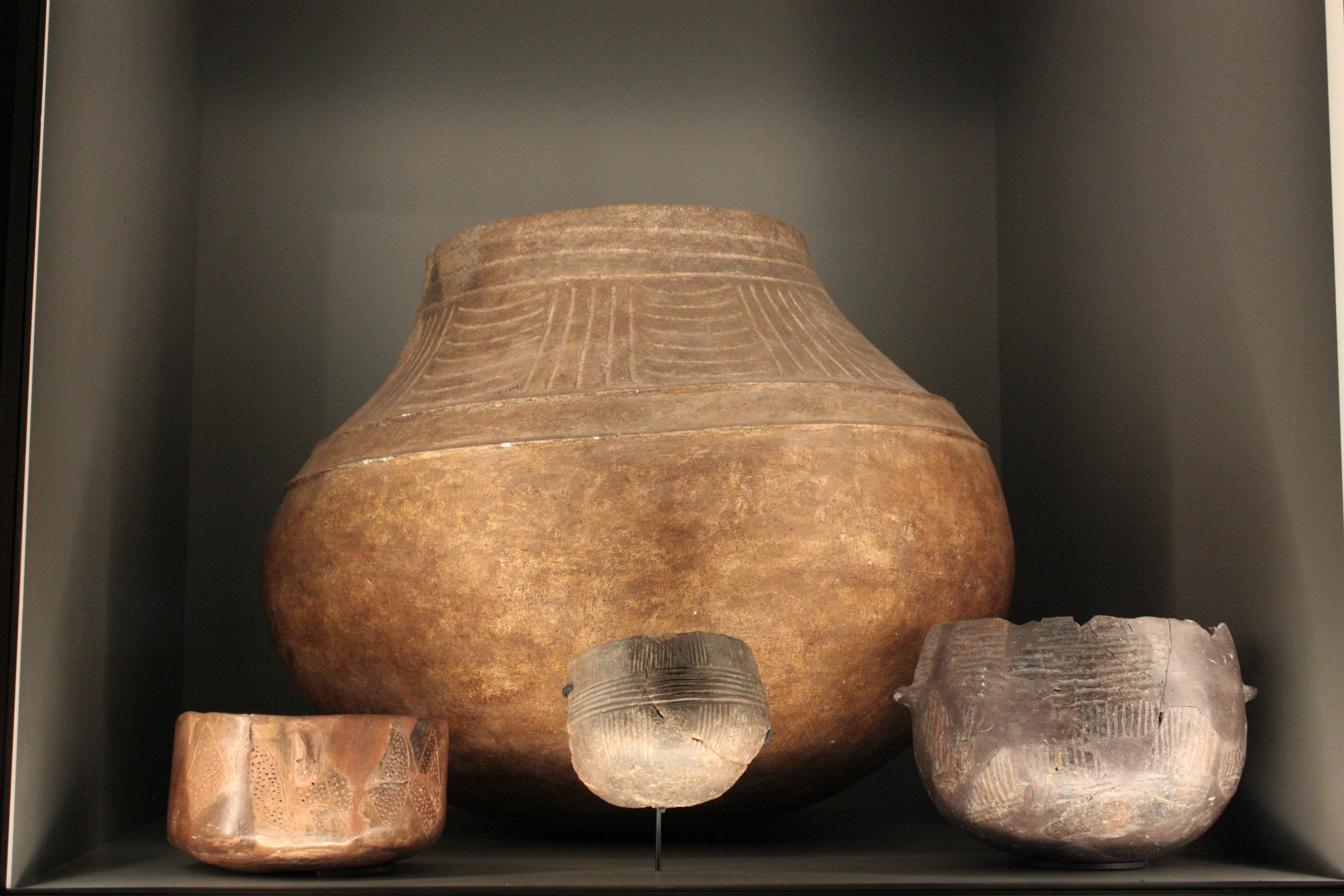
Ceramics from Fontbouisse, c. 3000 BC

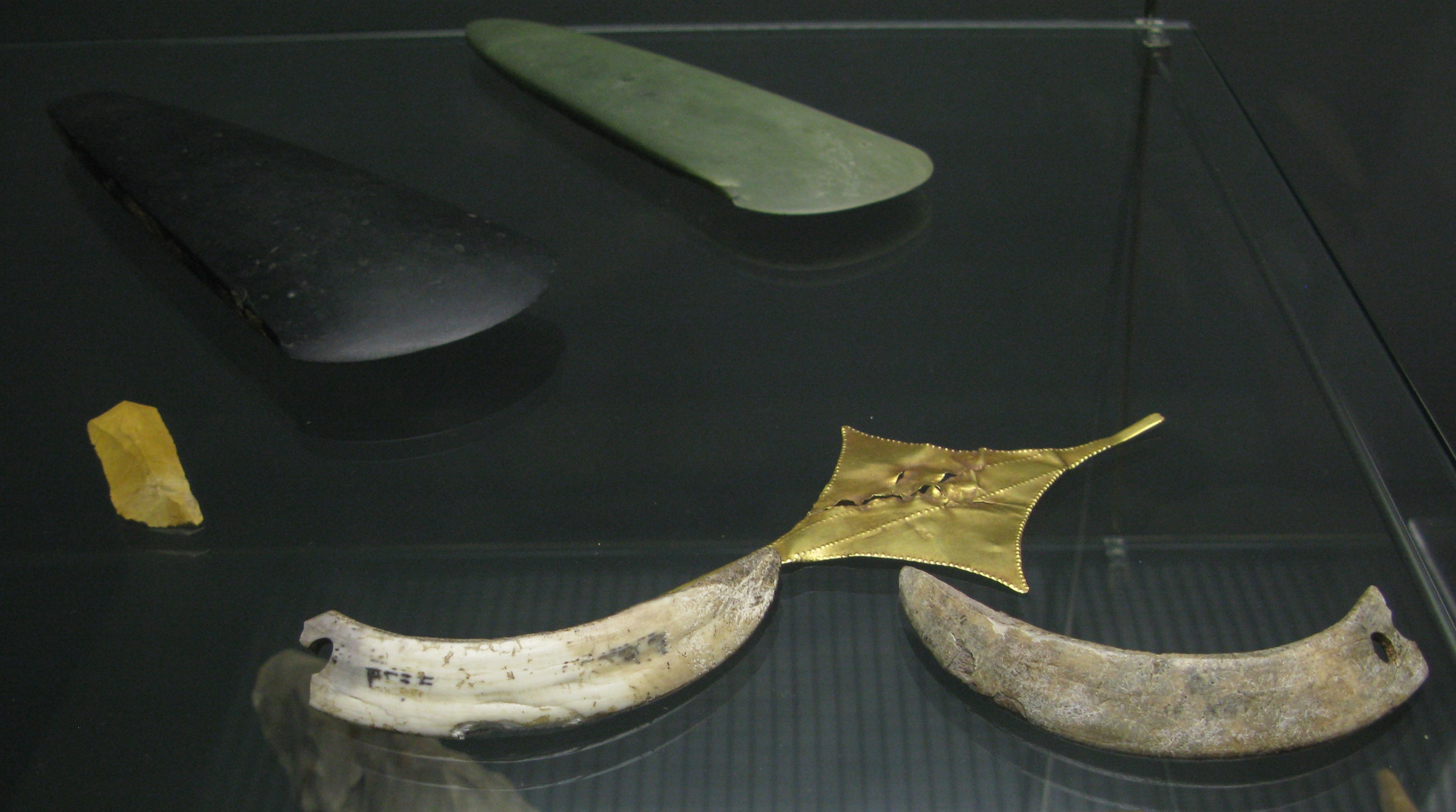
Gold diadem, jade axe and boar's tusk pectoral, Pauilhac, c. 3500 BC

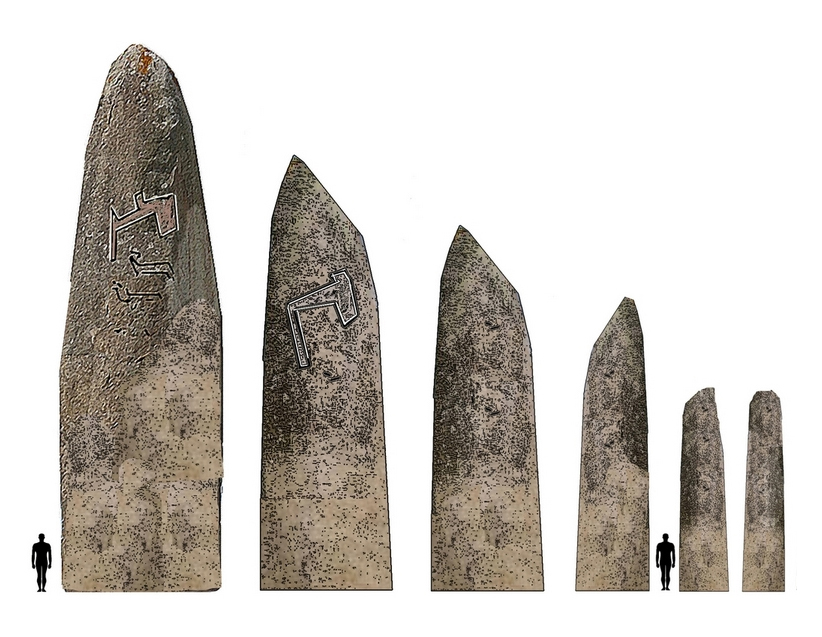
Locmariaquer megaliths, c. 4500 BC

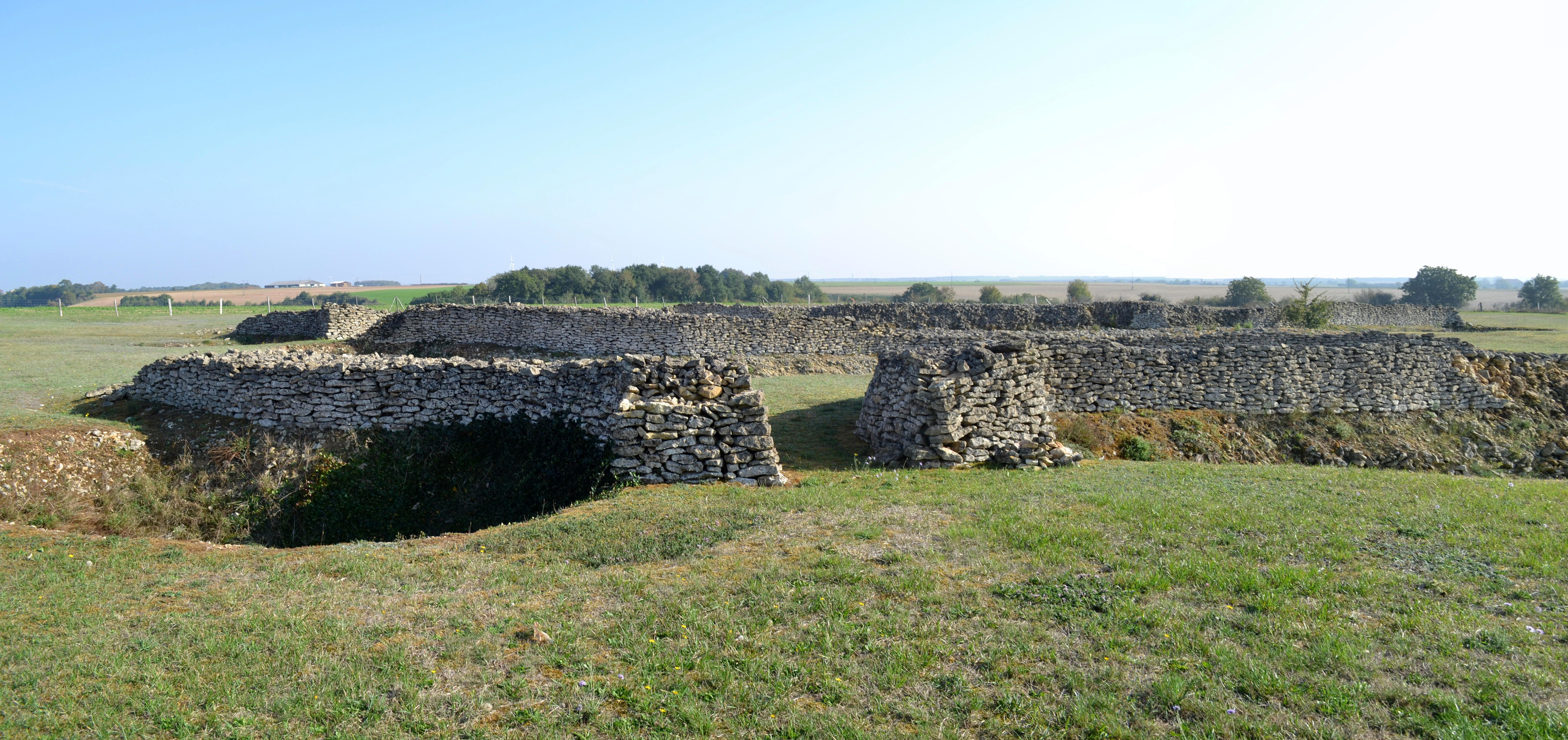
Champ Durand fortifications, c. 3400 BC

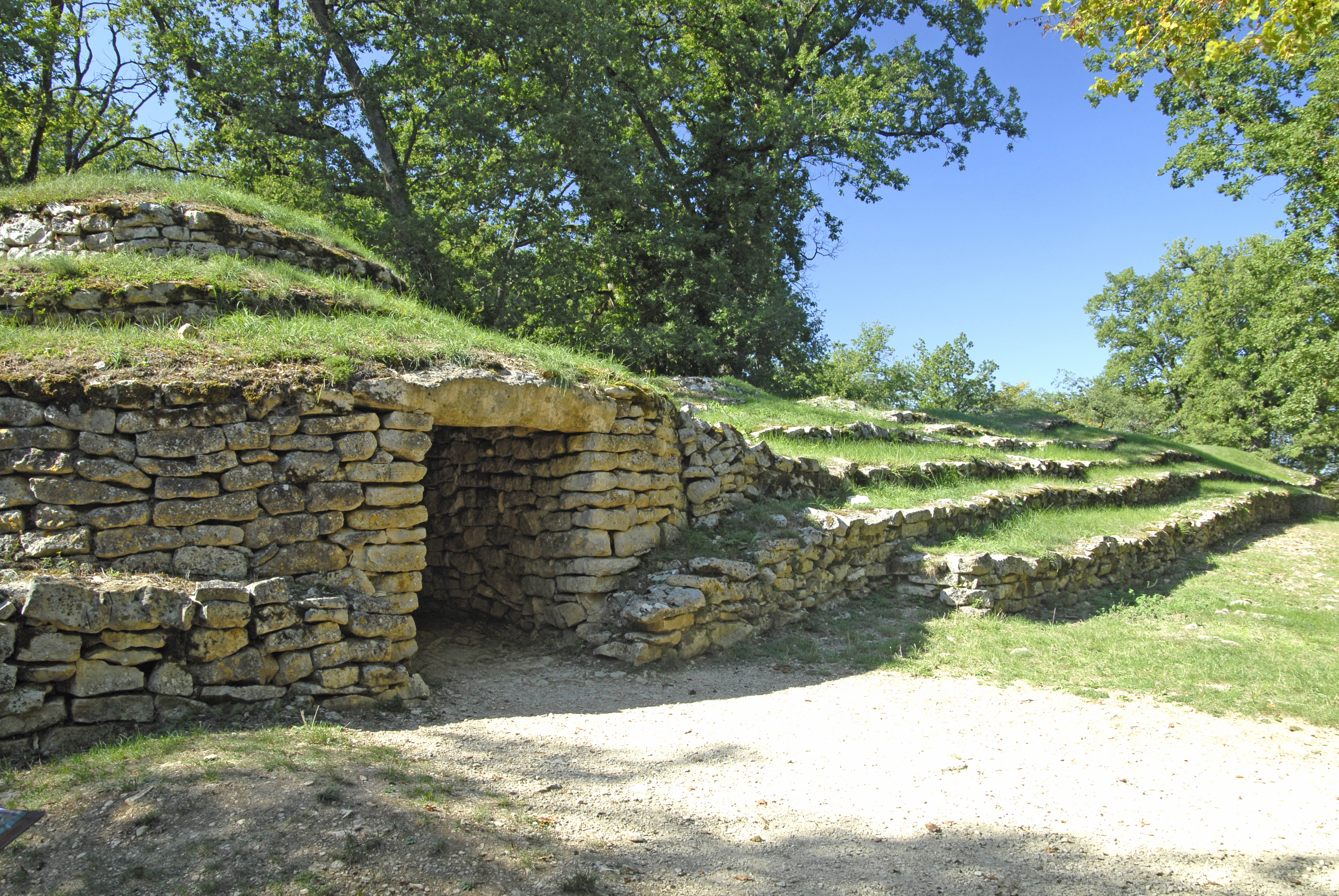
Tumulus of Bougon, c. 4700 BC

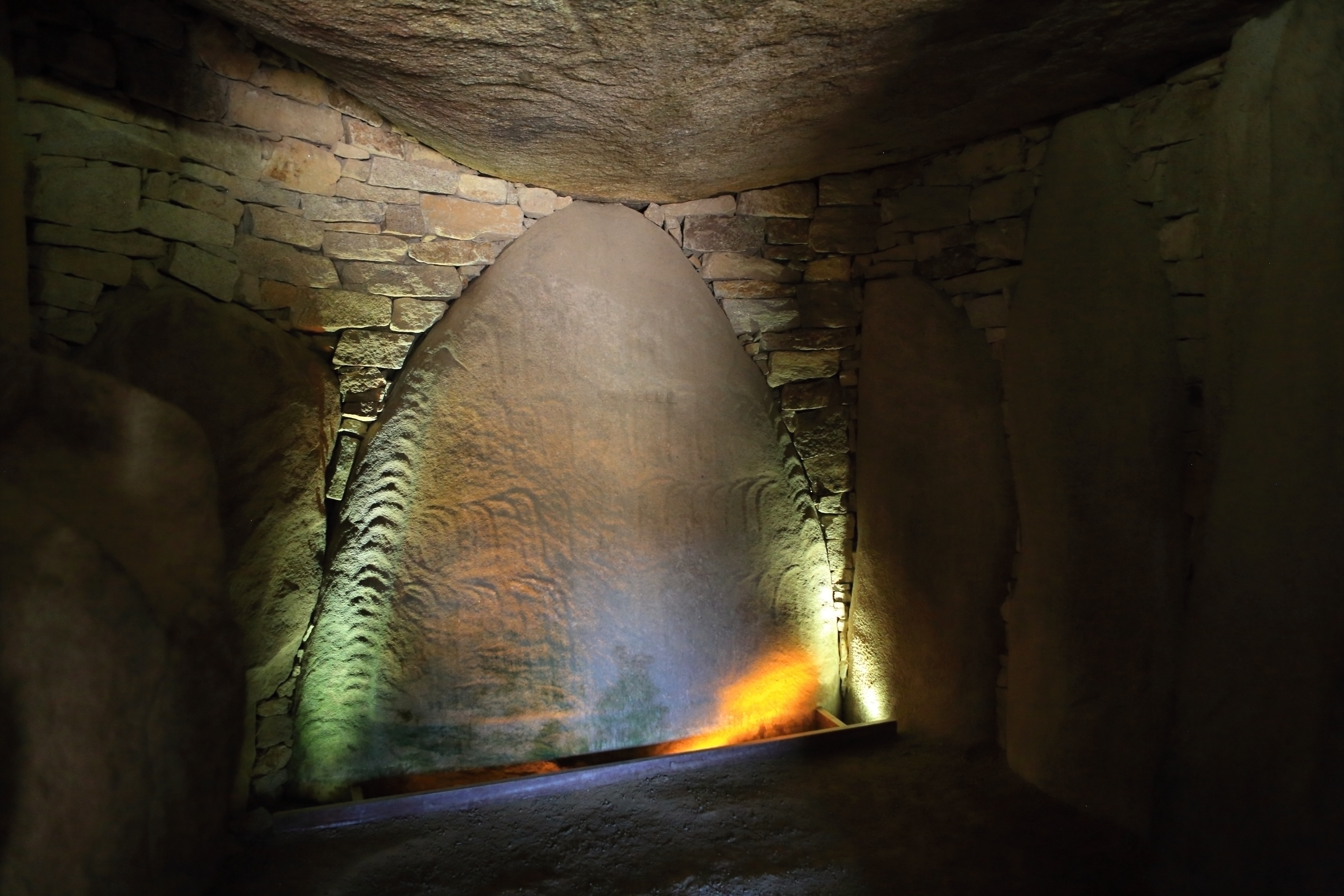
Table des Marchand, c. 4000 BC

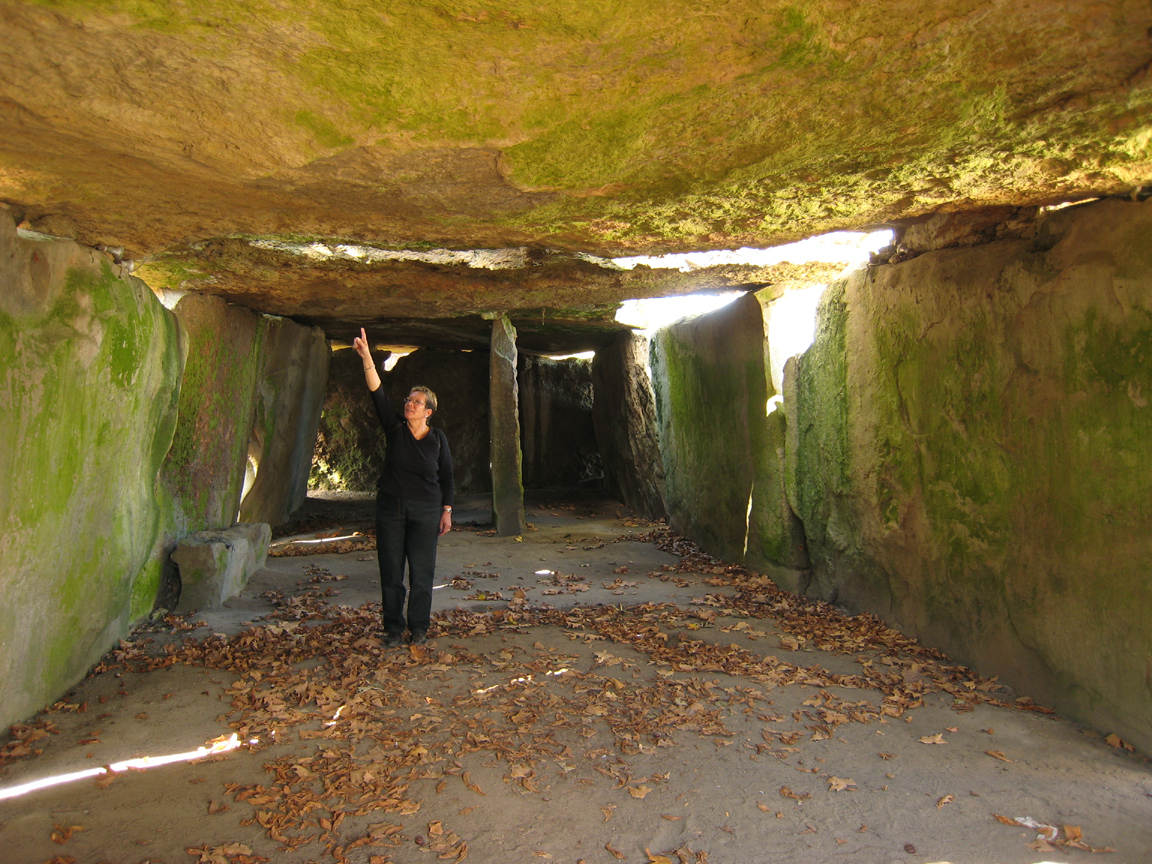
Dolmen de Bagneux, c. 4000-3000 BC

== The Copper Age ==
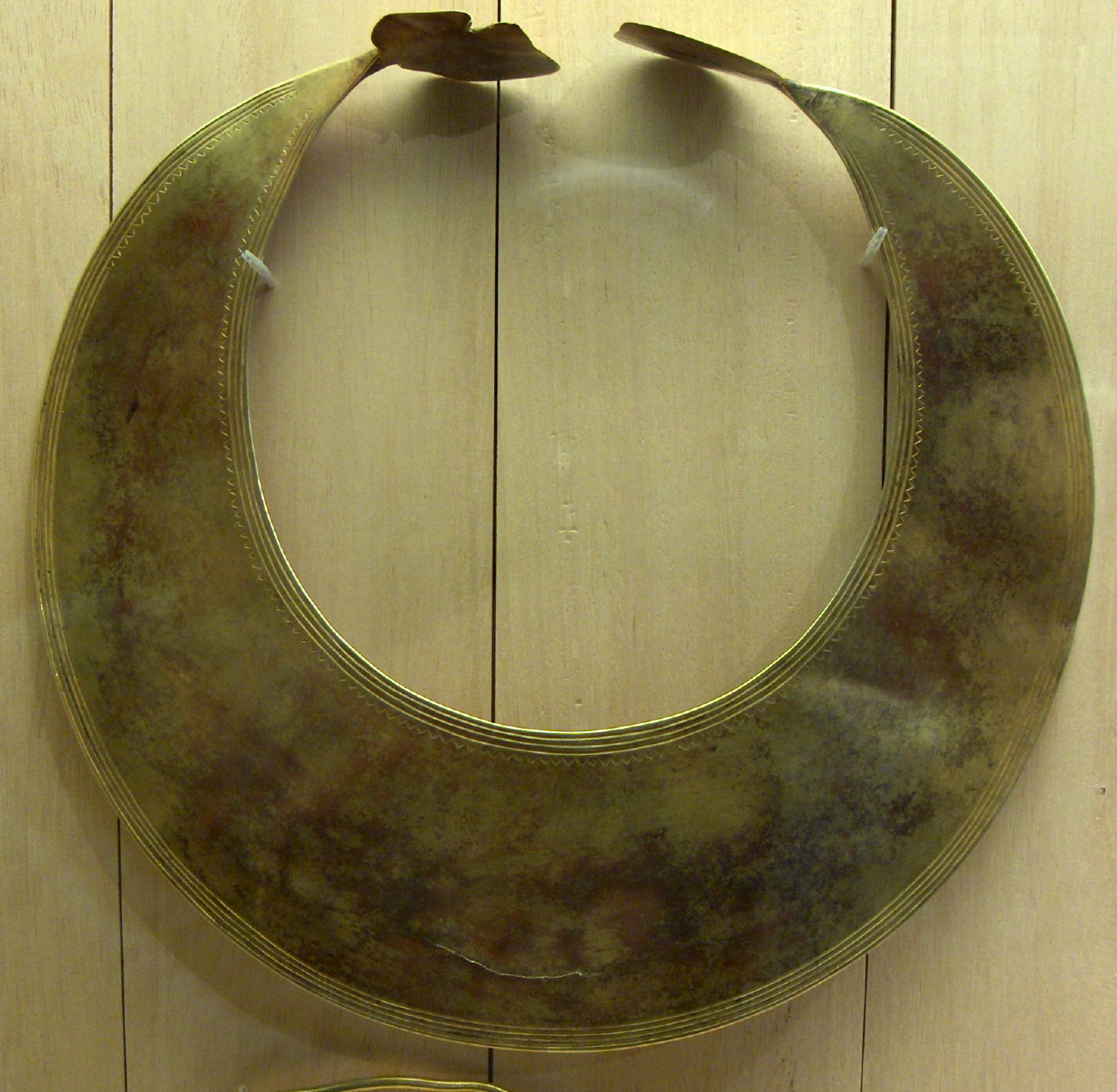
Gold lunula, Brittany, Bell Beaker culture, c. 2400-2000 BC

During the Chalcolithic or Copper Age, a transitional age from the Neolithic to the Bronze Age, France shows evidence of the Seine-Oise-Marne culture and the Beaker culture.

The Seine-Oise-Marne culture or "SOM culture" (c. 3100 to 2400 BC) is the name given by archaeologists to the final culture of the Neolithic in Northern France around the Oise River and Marne River. It is most famous for its gallery grave megalithic tombs which incorporate a port-hole slab separating the entrance from the main burial chamber. In the chalk valley of the Marne River rock-cut tombs were dug to a similar design. In the Southeast, several groups whose culture had evolved from Chasséen culture also built megaliths.

Beginning about 2600 BC, the Artenacian culture, a part of the larger European Megalithic Culture, developed in Dordogne, possibly as a reaction to the advance of Danubian peoples (such as SOM) over Western France. Armed with typical arrows, they took over all Atlantic France and Belgium by 2400 BC, establishing a stable border with the Indo-Europeans (Corded Ware) near the Rhine that would remain stable for more than a millennium.

The Bell Beaker culture (c. 2800–1900 BC) was a widespread phenomenon that expanded over most of France, excluding the Massif Central, in the third and early second millennia BC.

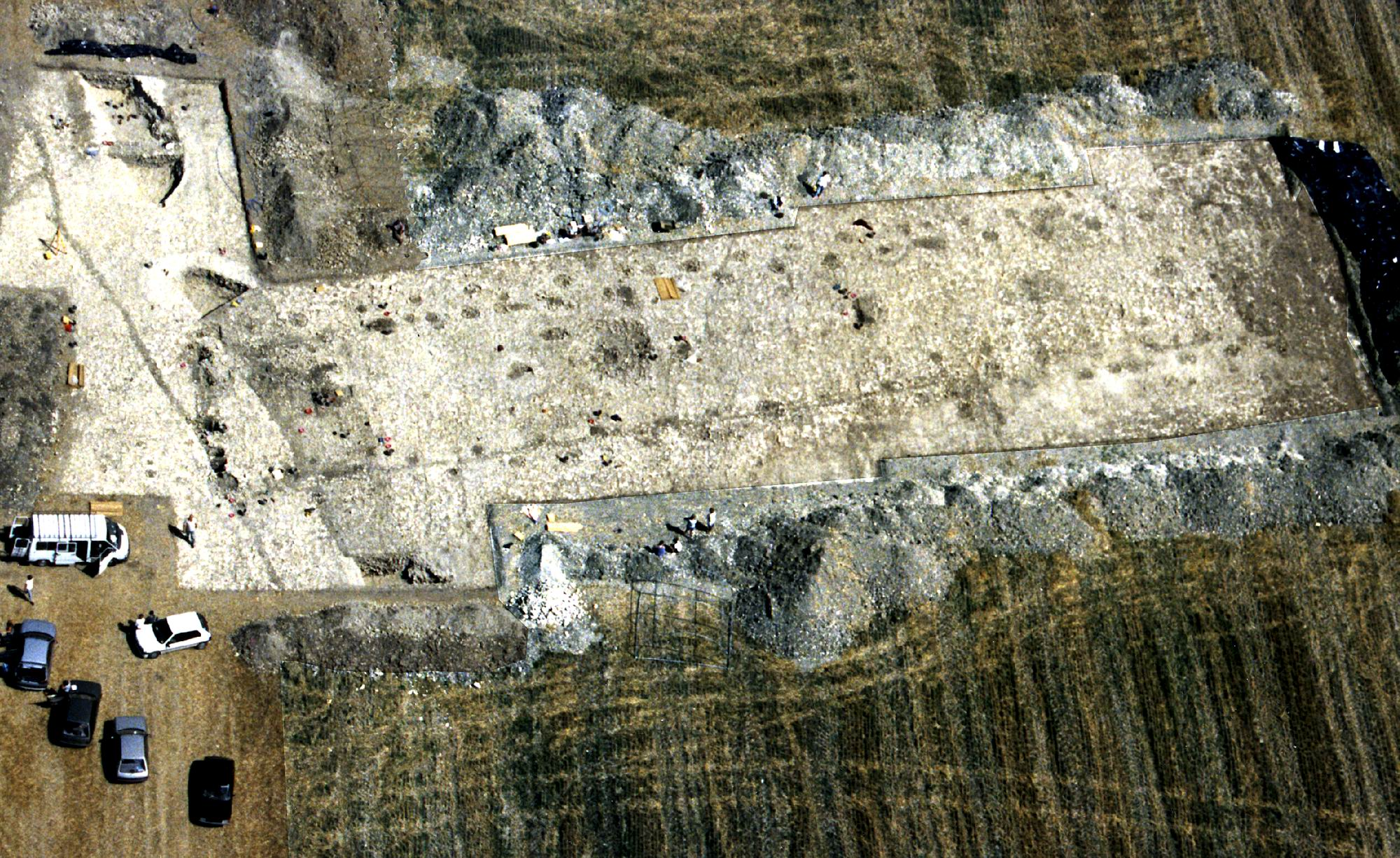
Remains of a large building at Challignac, Artenacian culture

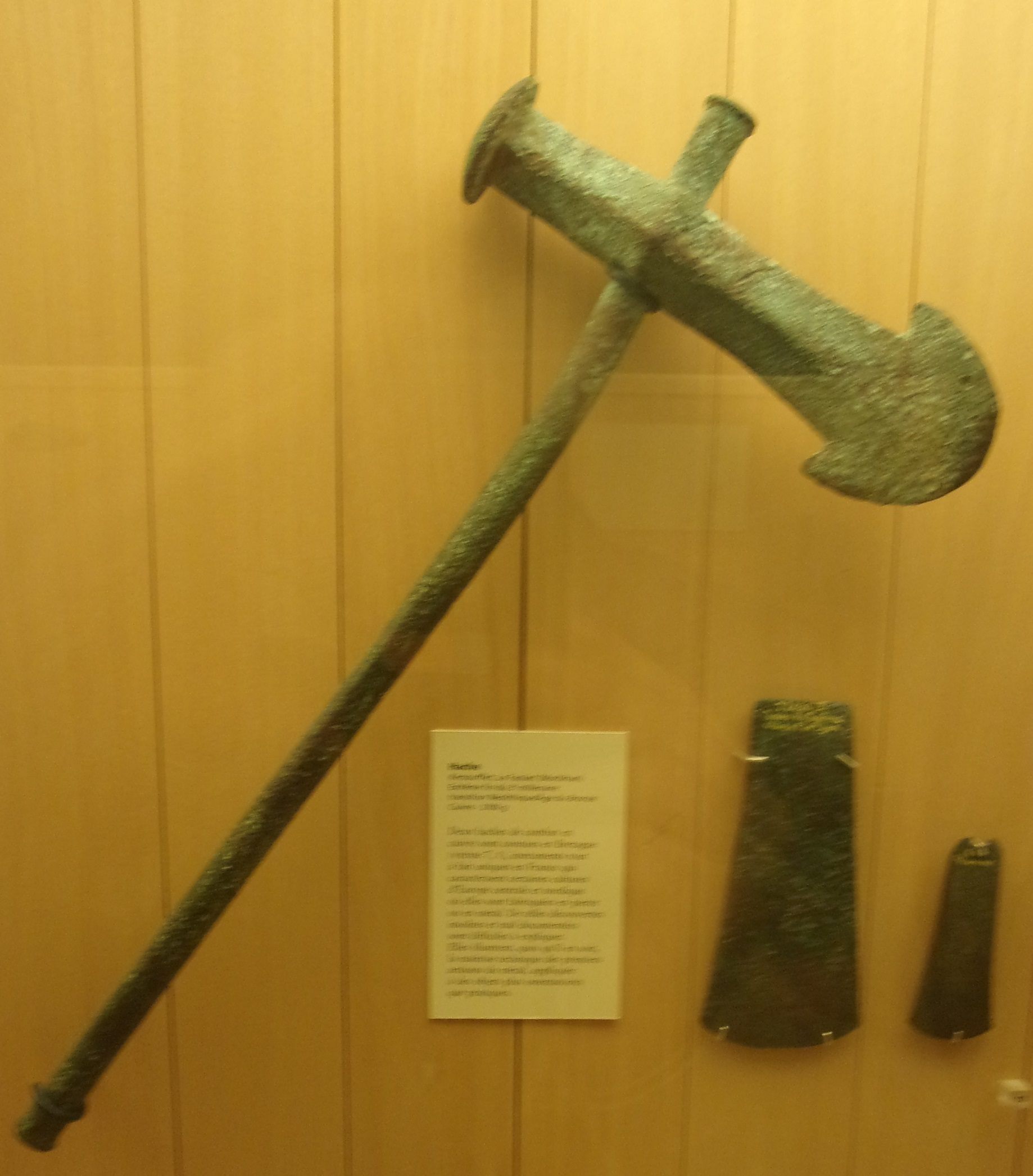
Copper axe, Brittany, 3rd millennium BC

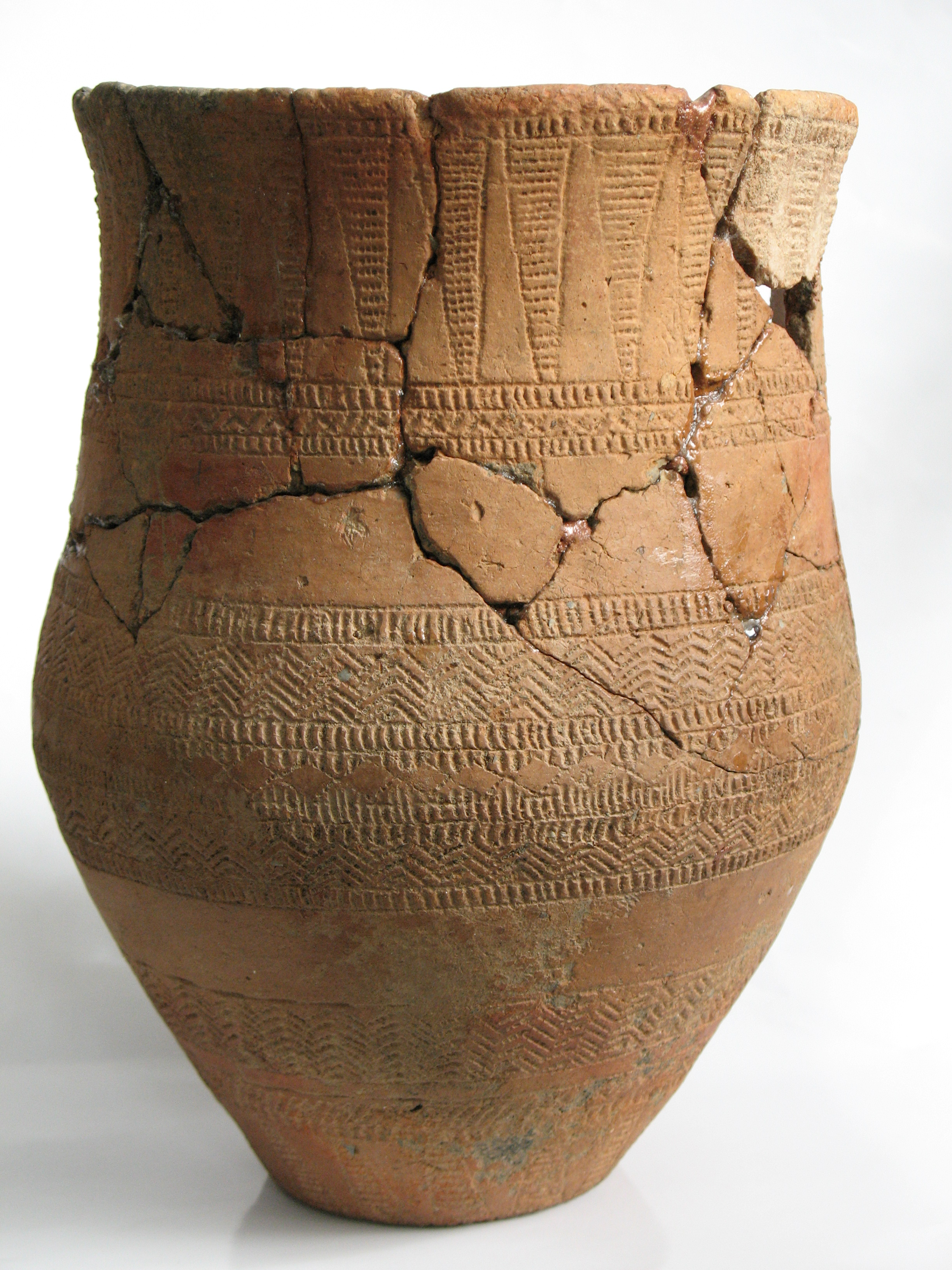
Bell Beaker, c. 2500 BC

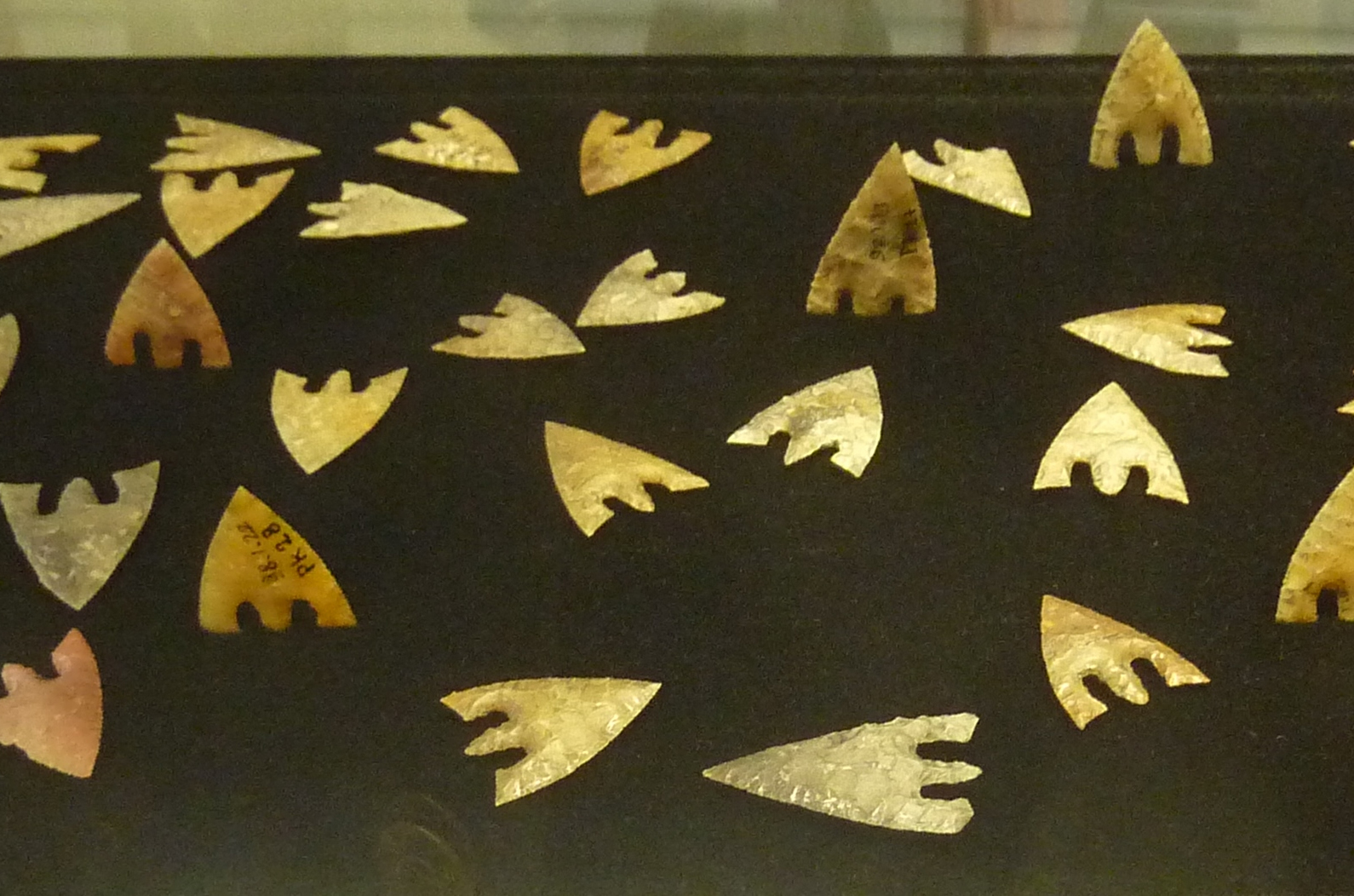
Flint arrowheads, Bell Beaker culture

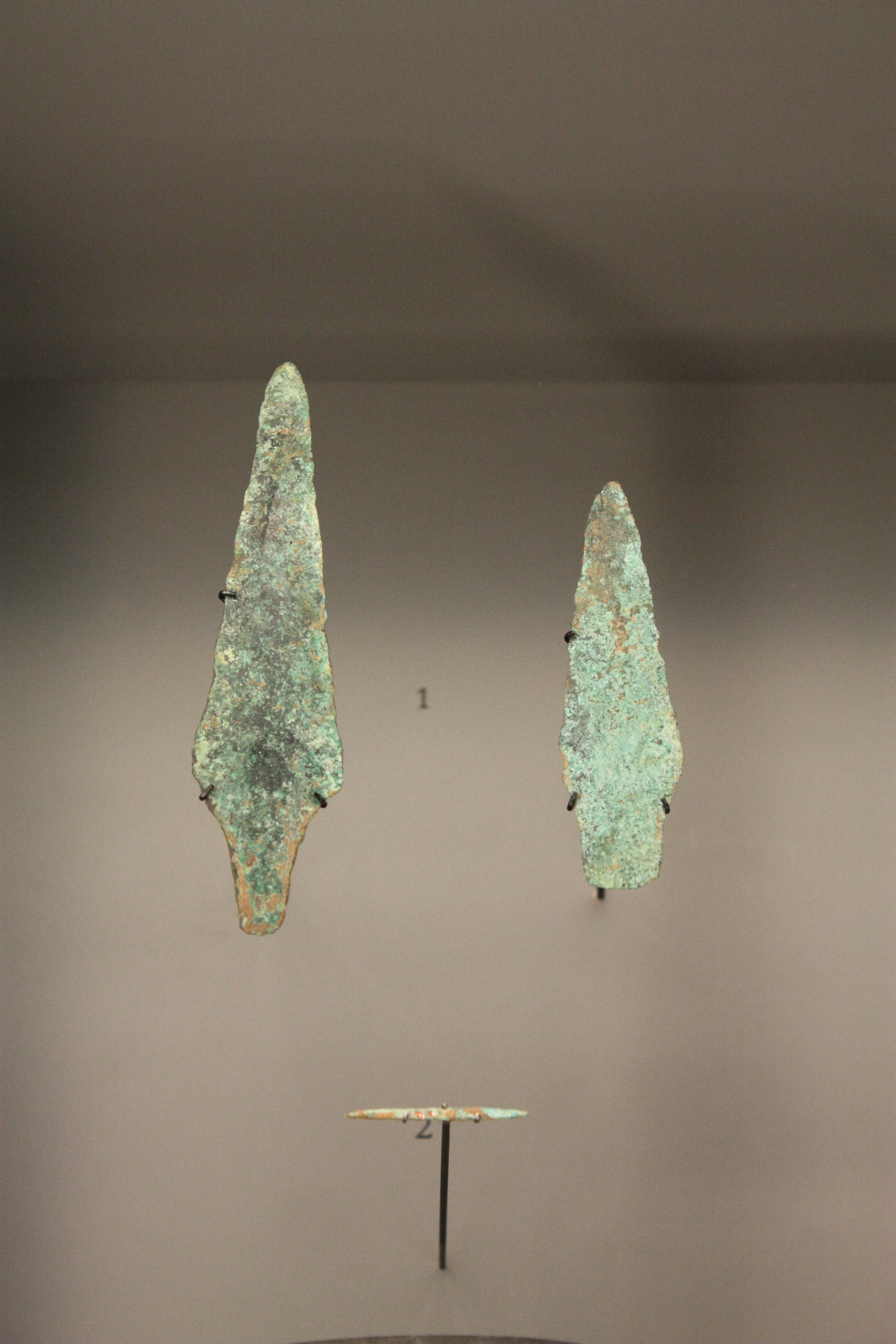
Copper daggers, Bell Beaker culture

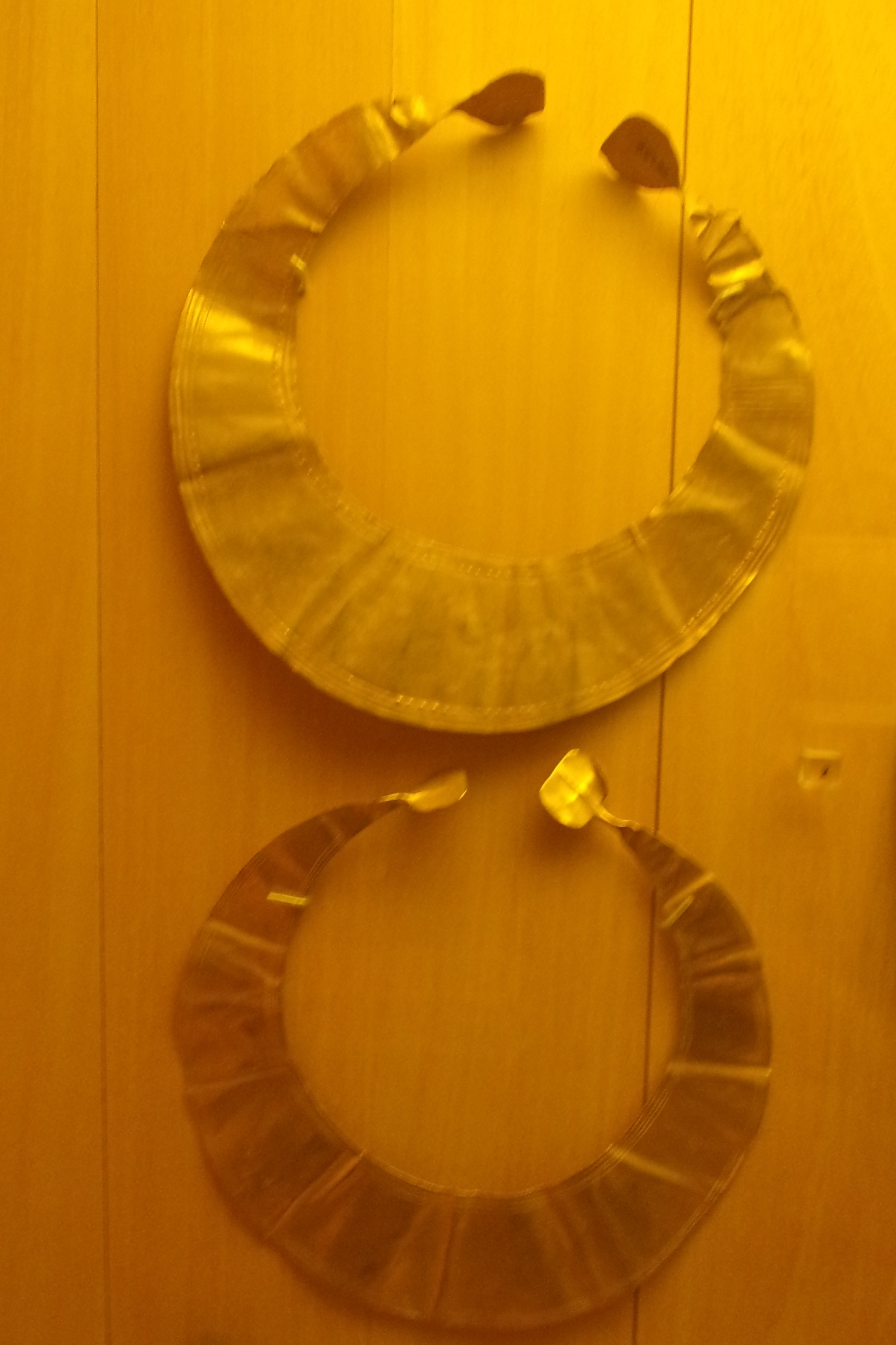
Gold lunulas, Brittany, Bell Beaker culture, c. 2400-2000 BC

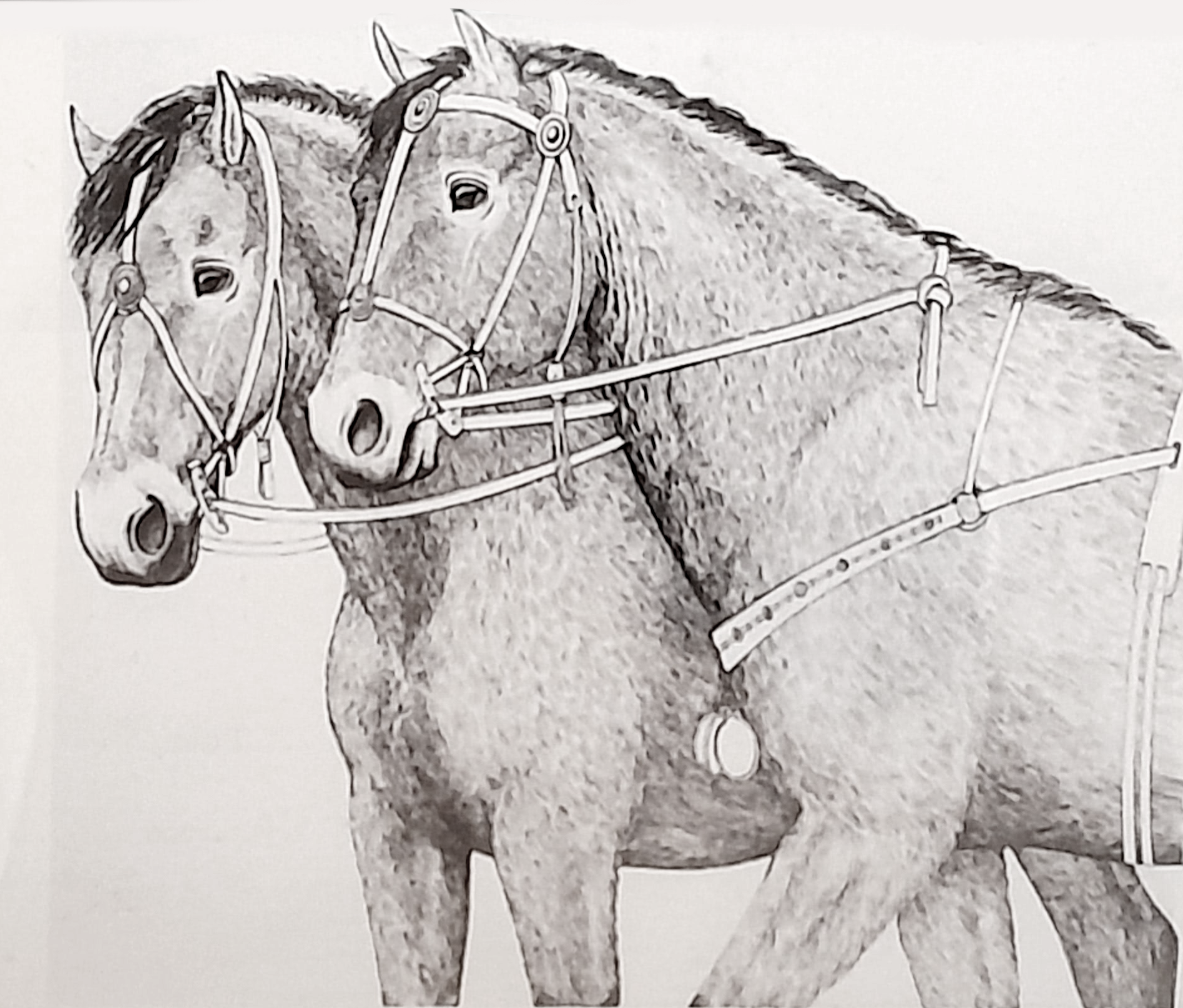
The Bell Beaker culture had domesticated horses.

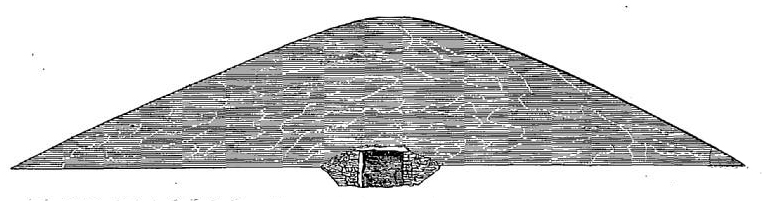
Burial mound, Brittany

== The Bronze Age ==
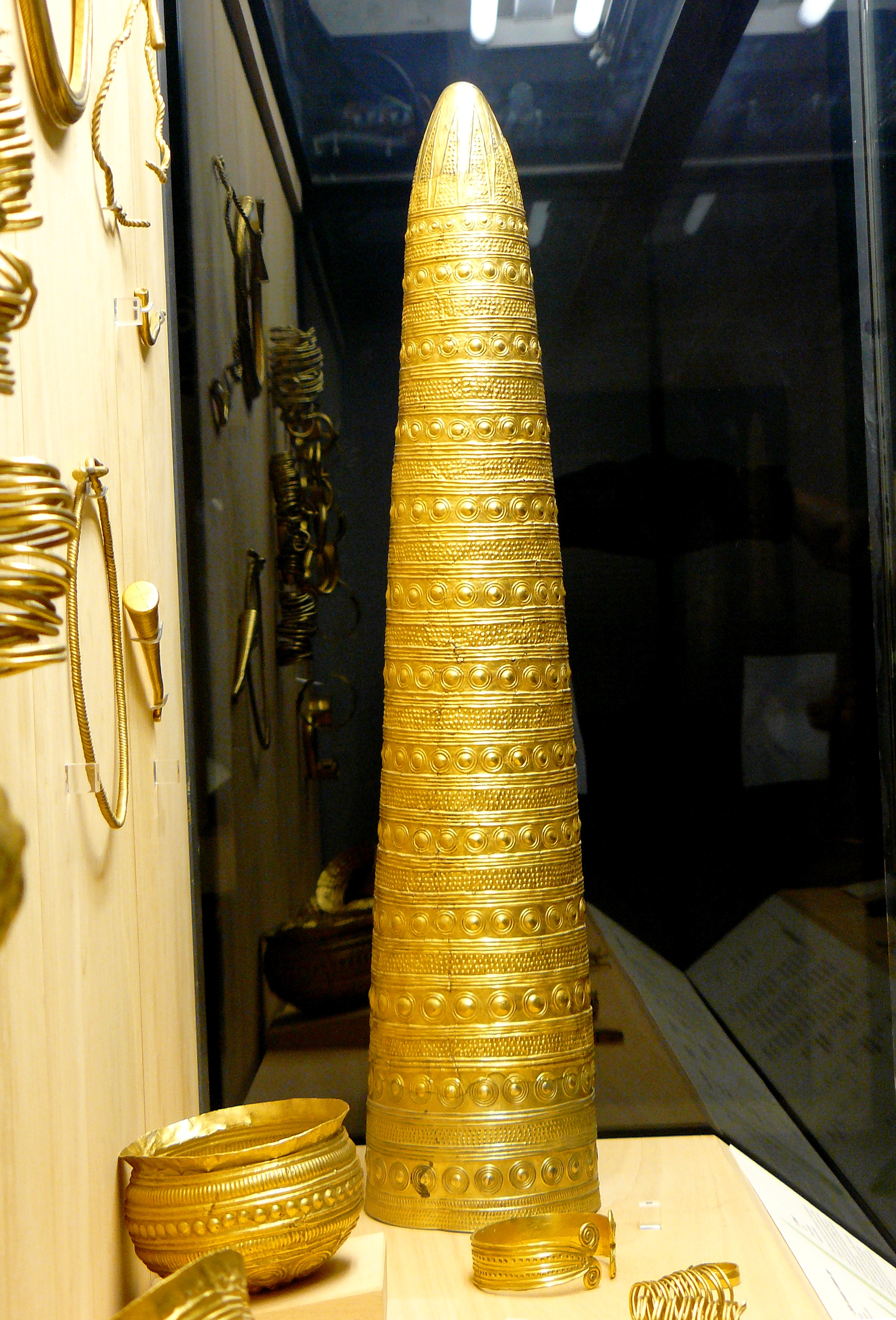
Avanton gold hat, Tumulus culture, 1400 BC

In the Kurgan Hypothesis, Indo-European languages spread to Europe in the Bronze Age. The culture of the Kurgans is also known as Yamnaya Culture and recent results from acheaogenetics have linked this culture with genetic ancestry components of the Western Steppe Herders, and it has been possible to reconstruct migrations of these people across Europe co-extensive with the arrival of the Yamnaya and Corded Ware cultures.

In France, the first studies on the Bronze Age date from the 19th century. The "Manuel d'archéologie préhistorique, celtique et gallo-romaine," (Manual of Prehistoric, Celtic and Gallo-Roman Archaeology), by Joseph Déchelette, published in 1910, was for a long time the reference for the study of this period. In the 1950s, Jean-Jacques Hatt proposed a subdivision of the French Bronze Age, and in 1958 he published a tripartate division. This model divided the Bronze Age into three parts, Early Bronze, Middle Bronze and Late Bronze Age and serves as a reference for the majority of subsequent studies on the Bronze Age in France.

The Bronze Age archeological cultures in France include the transitional Beaker culture (c. 2800–1900 BC), the Early Bronze Age Rhône culture (c. 2300-1600 BC) and Armorican Tumulus culture (c. 2200 – c. 1400 BC), the Middle Bronze Age Tumulus culture (c. 1600-1200 BC), and the Late Bronze Age Atlantic Bronze Age (c. 1300 – c. 700 BC) and Urnfield culture (c. 1300-800 BC). Early Bronze Age sites in Brittany (Armorican Tumulus culture) are believed to have grown out of Beaker roots, with some Wessex culture and Unetice culture influence. Some scholars think that the Urnfield culture represents an origin for the Celts as a distinct cultural branch of the Indo-European family (see Proto-Celtic). This culture was preeminent in central Europe during the late Bronze Age; the Urnfield period saw a dramatic increase in population in the region, probably due to innovations in technology and agricultural practices.

Some archeologists date the arrival of several non-Indo-European peoples to this period, including the Iberians in southern France and Spain, the Ligures on the Mediterranean coast, and the Vascons (Basques) in southwest France and Spain.

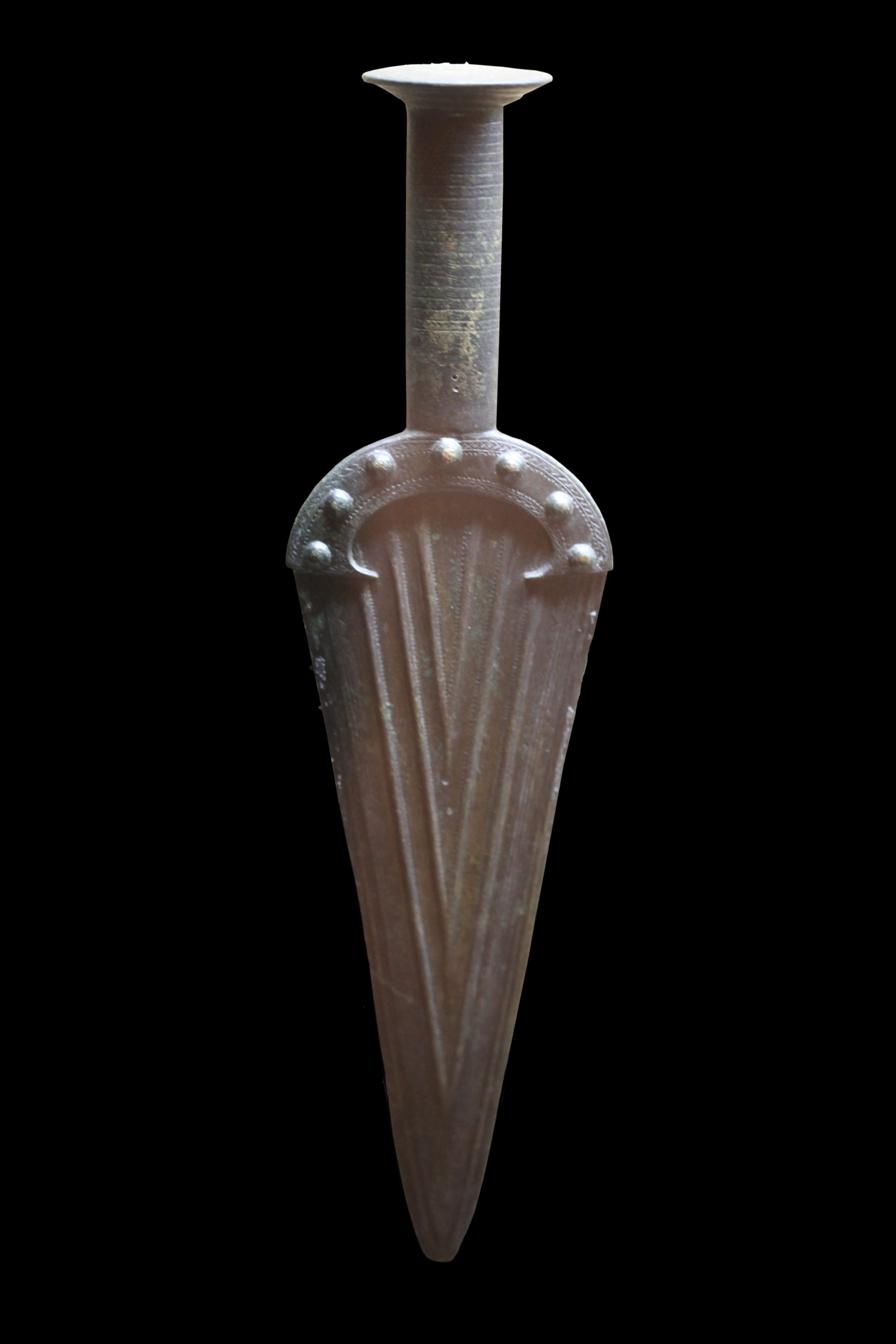
Bronze dagger, Rhône culture, c. 2000 BC

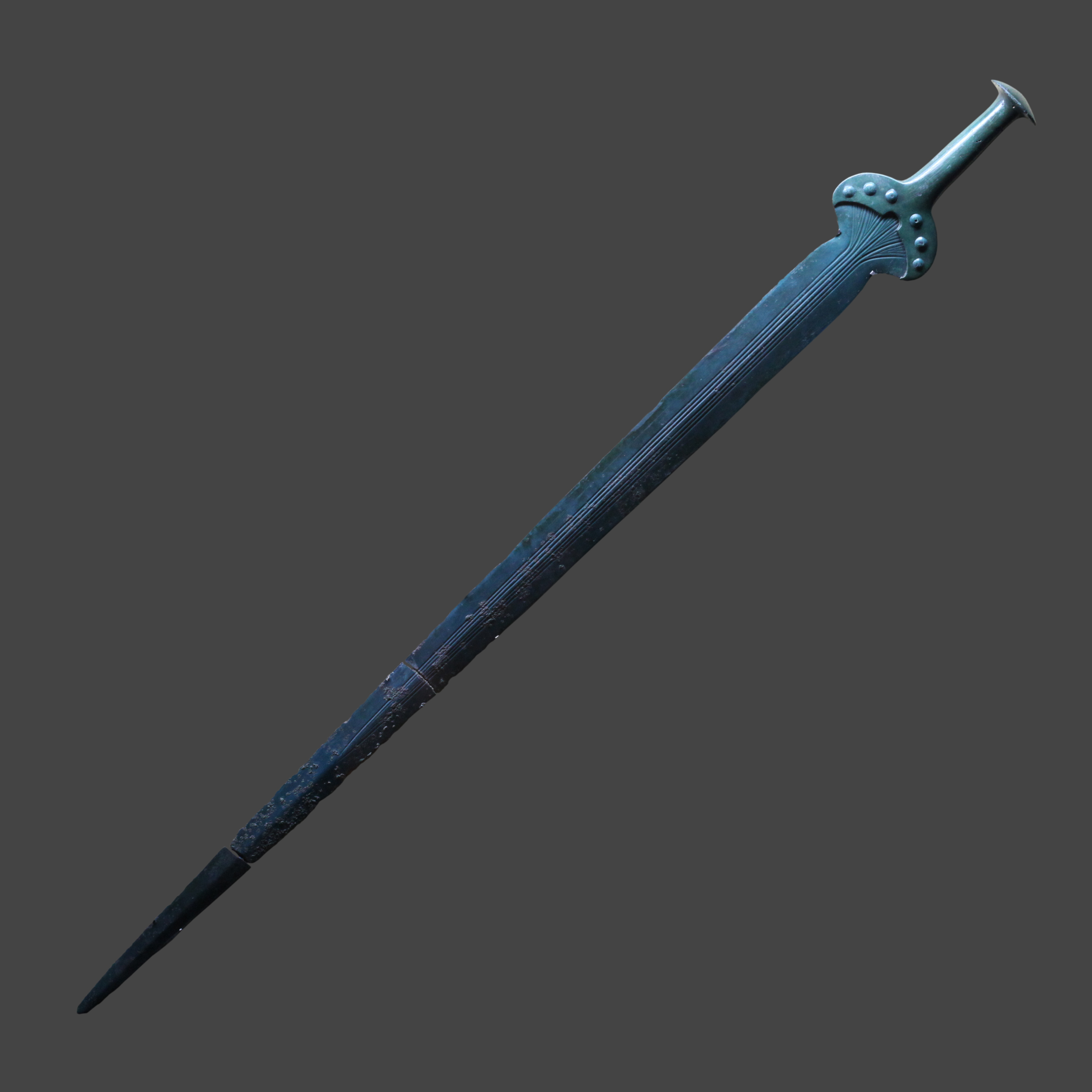
Bronze sword, Tumulus culture, c. 1550 BC. (Note: The technostylistic origin of the swords of Tréboul and Le Cheylounet types has been widely debated elsewhere. For the former, J. Briard (1965) favoured an evolution from the Armorican Tumulus daggers; for the latter, J.P. Daugas and D. Vuaillat (2009) highlight a Unétician tradition, but the strong technostylistic kinship between the two sword types suggests a complex interplay of influences. Their chronological position is clearly established: Middle Bronze Age 1, from about 1550 to 1450 BC according to the latest available chronological details. (Translated from French).)

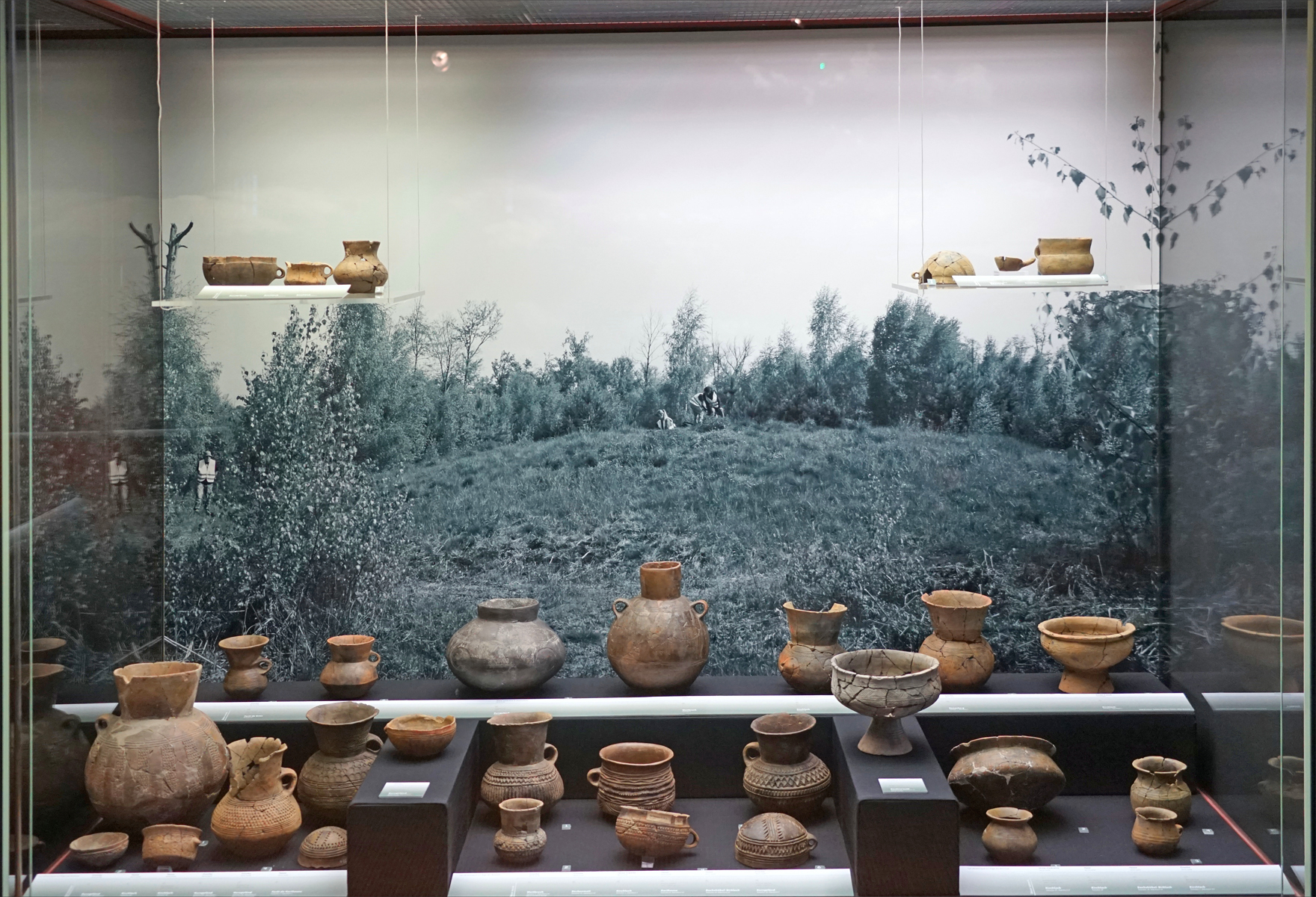
Tumulus culture ceramics

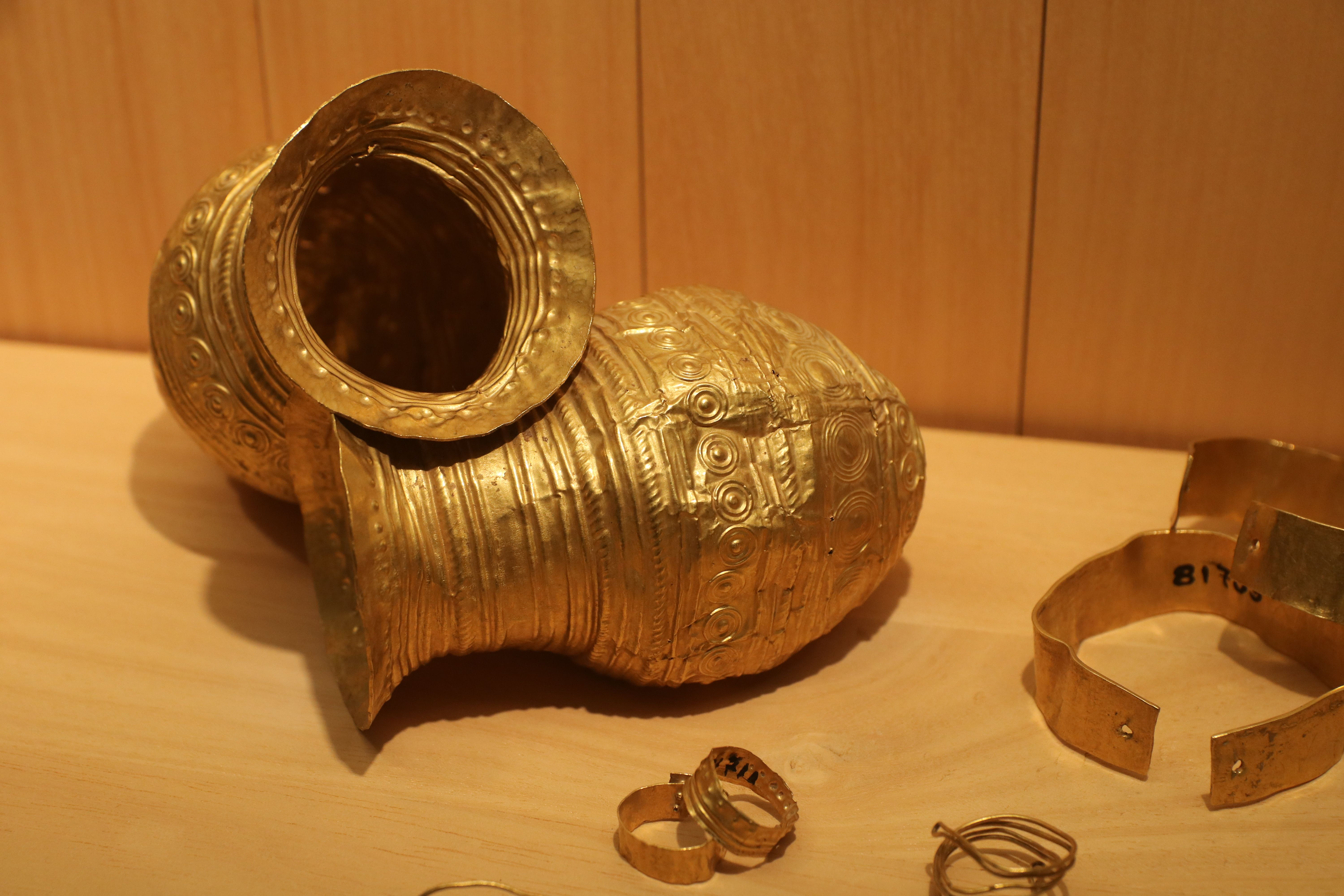
Gold vessels, Tumulus culture, c. 1400 BC

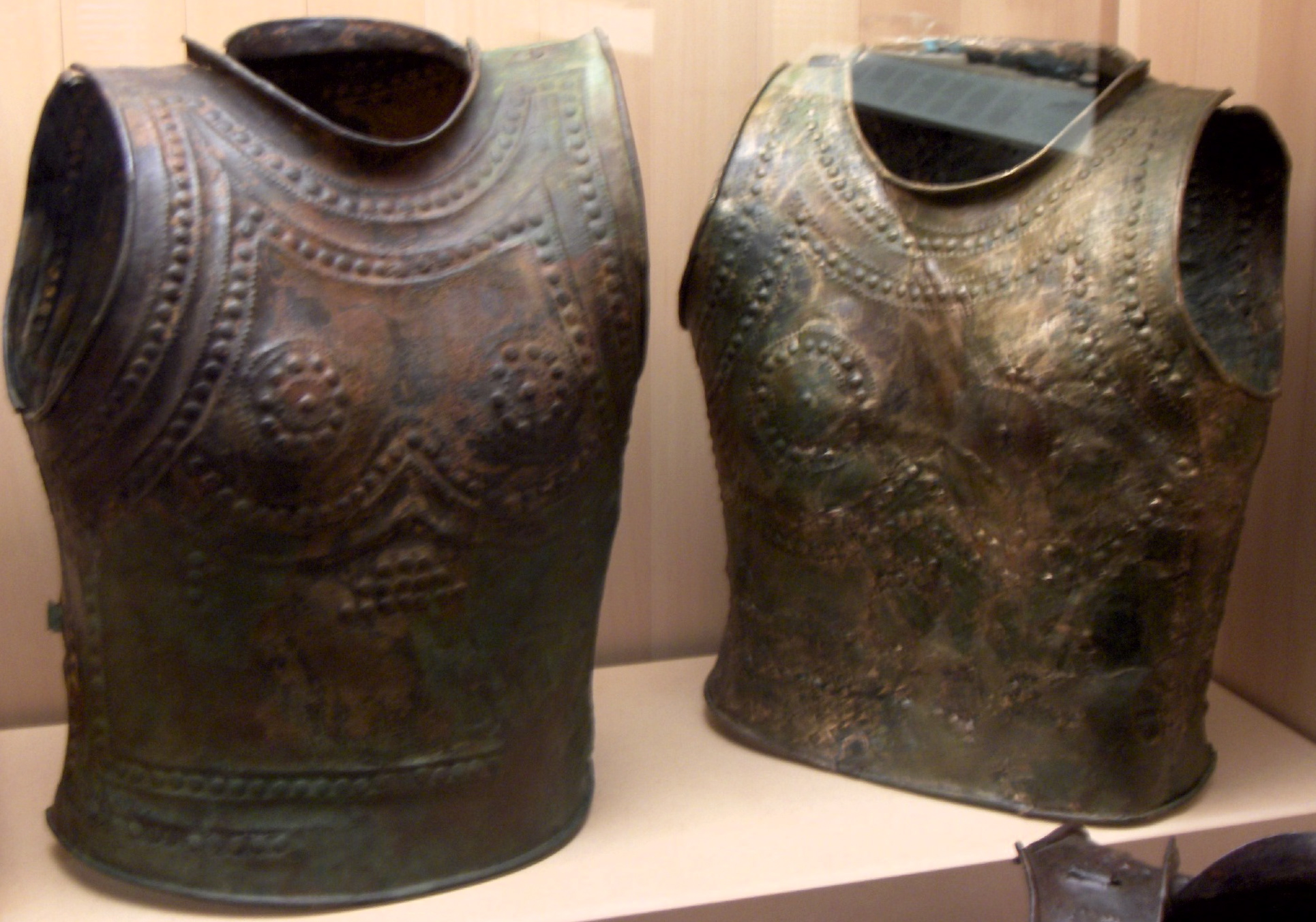
Bronze cuirasses, Urnfield culture, 900 BC

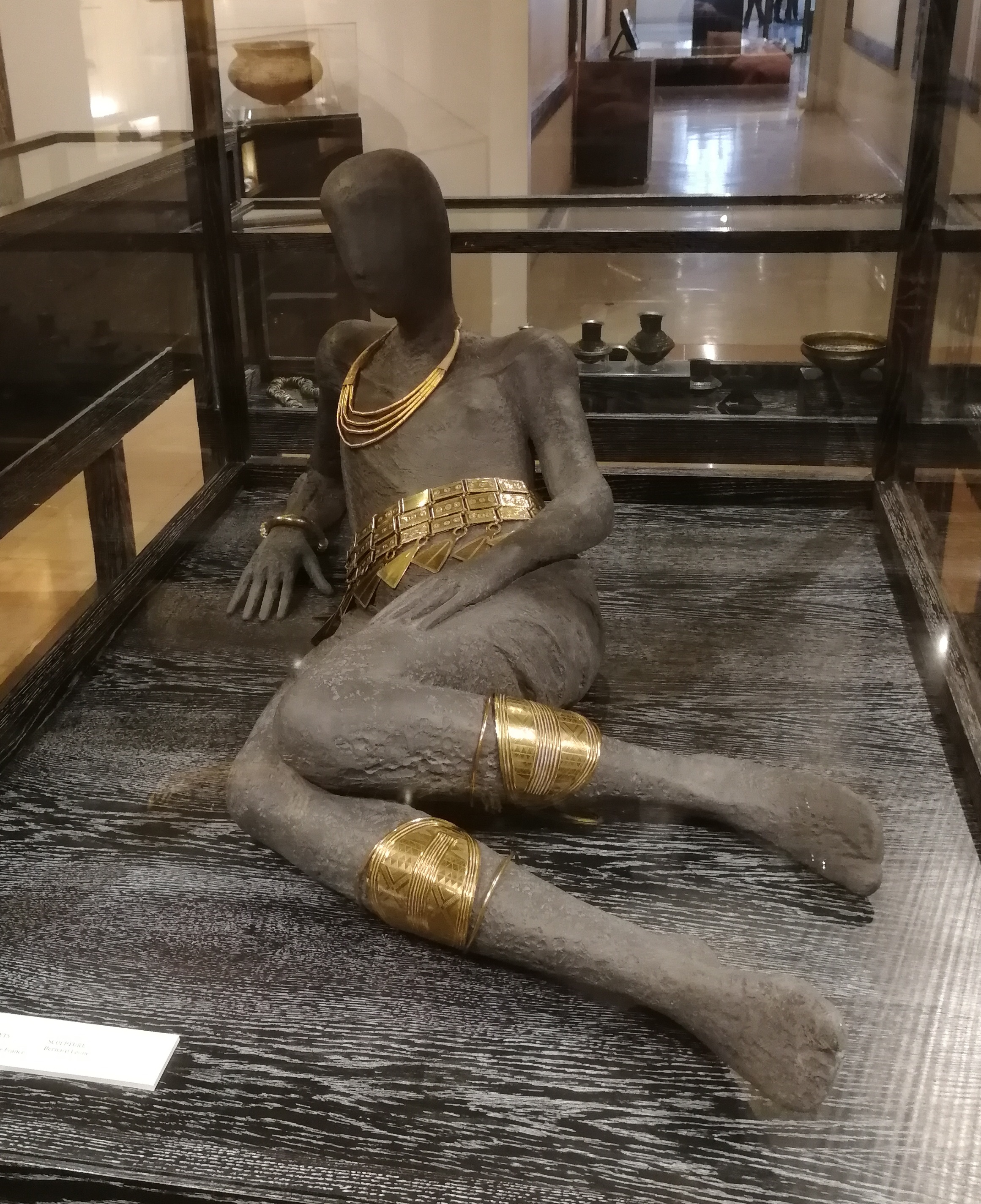
Bronze jewelry and vessels, Urnfield culture, c. 1000 BC.

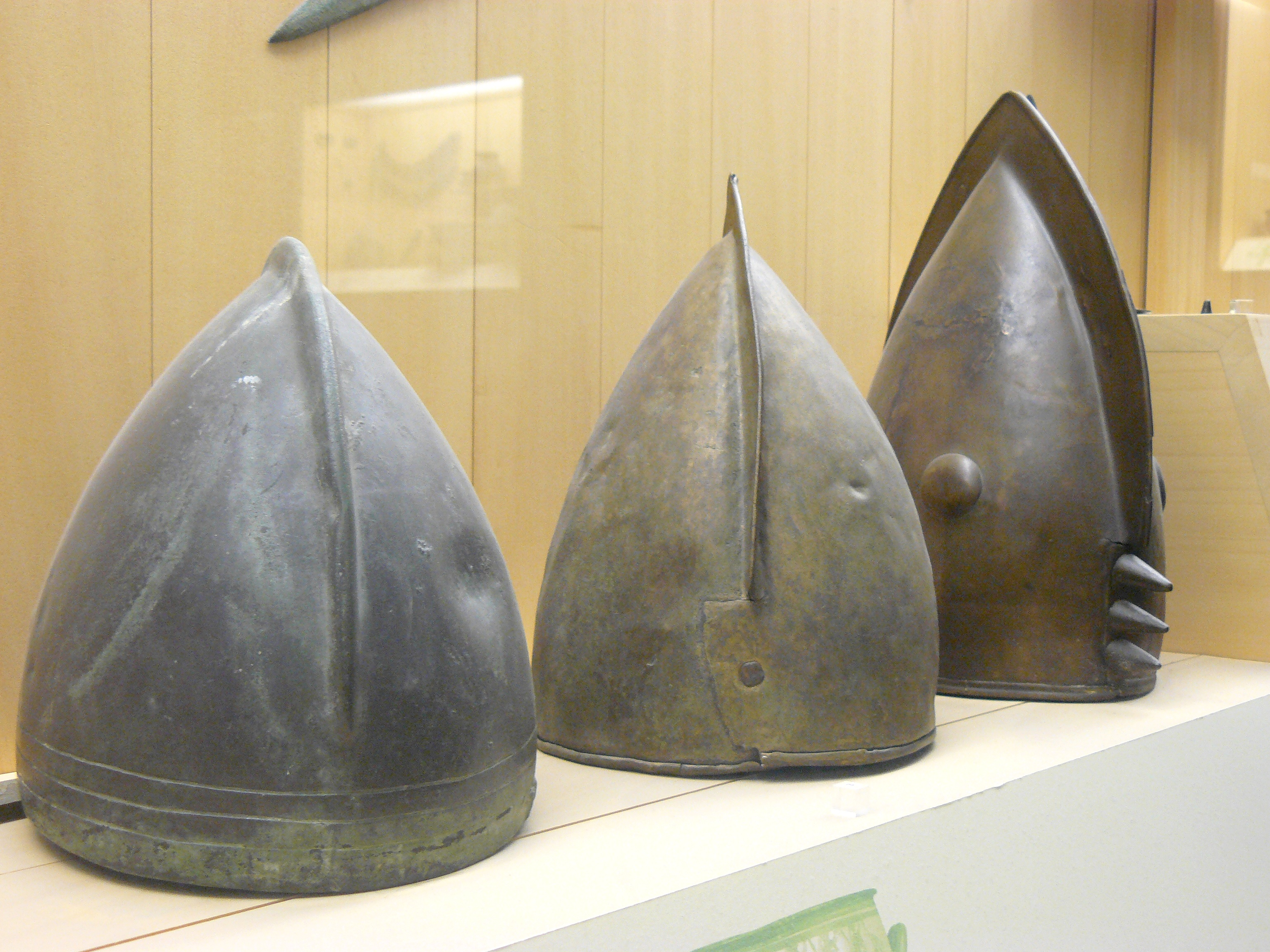
Bronze helmets, Urnfield culture, 1100-900 BC

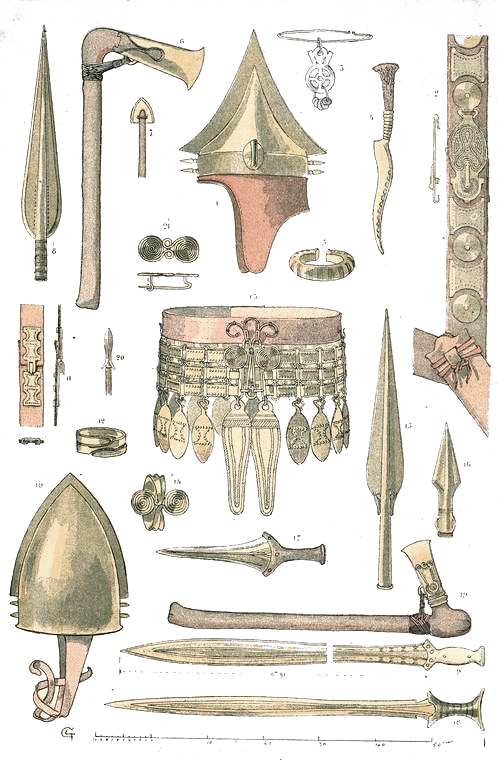
Urnfield culture artefacts

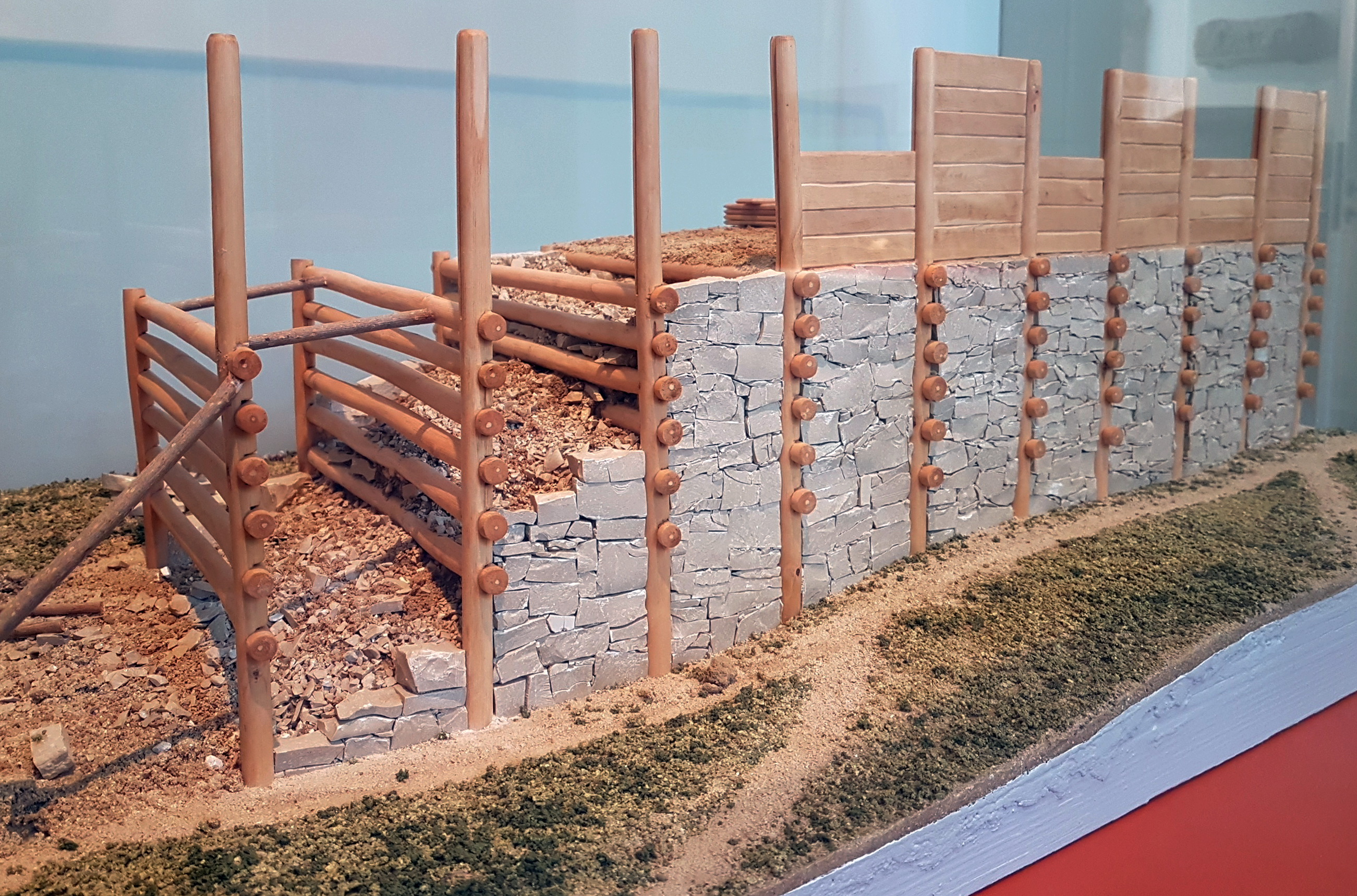
Model of a fortification wall, Urnfield culture

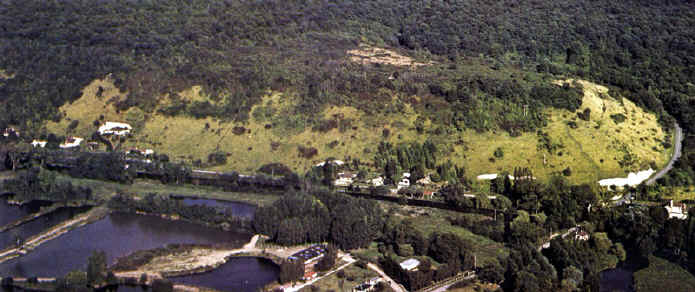
Fort Harrouard hillfort, Middle-Late Bronze Age

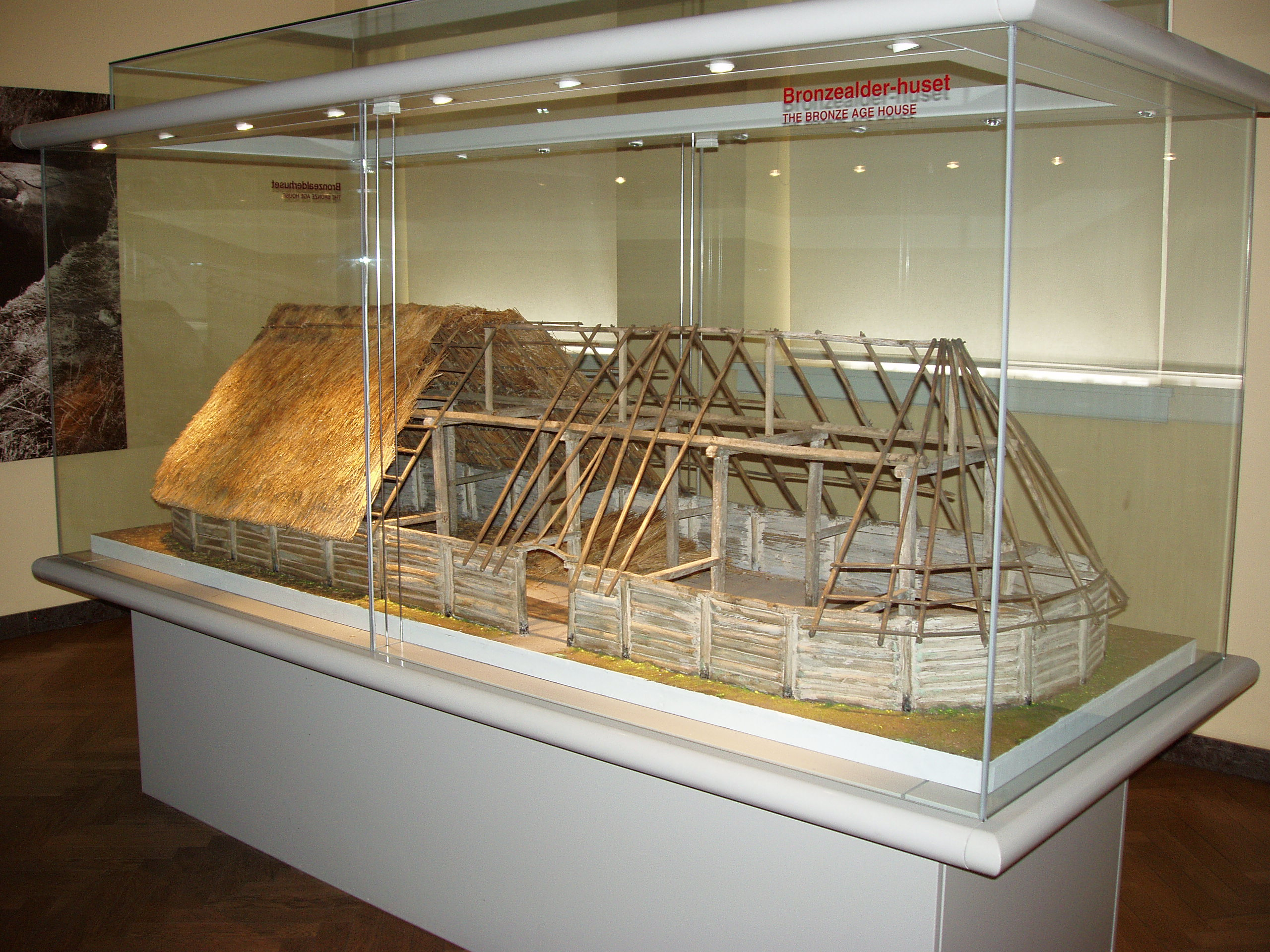
Model of a Middle Bronze Age house

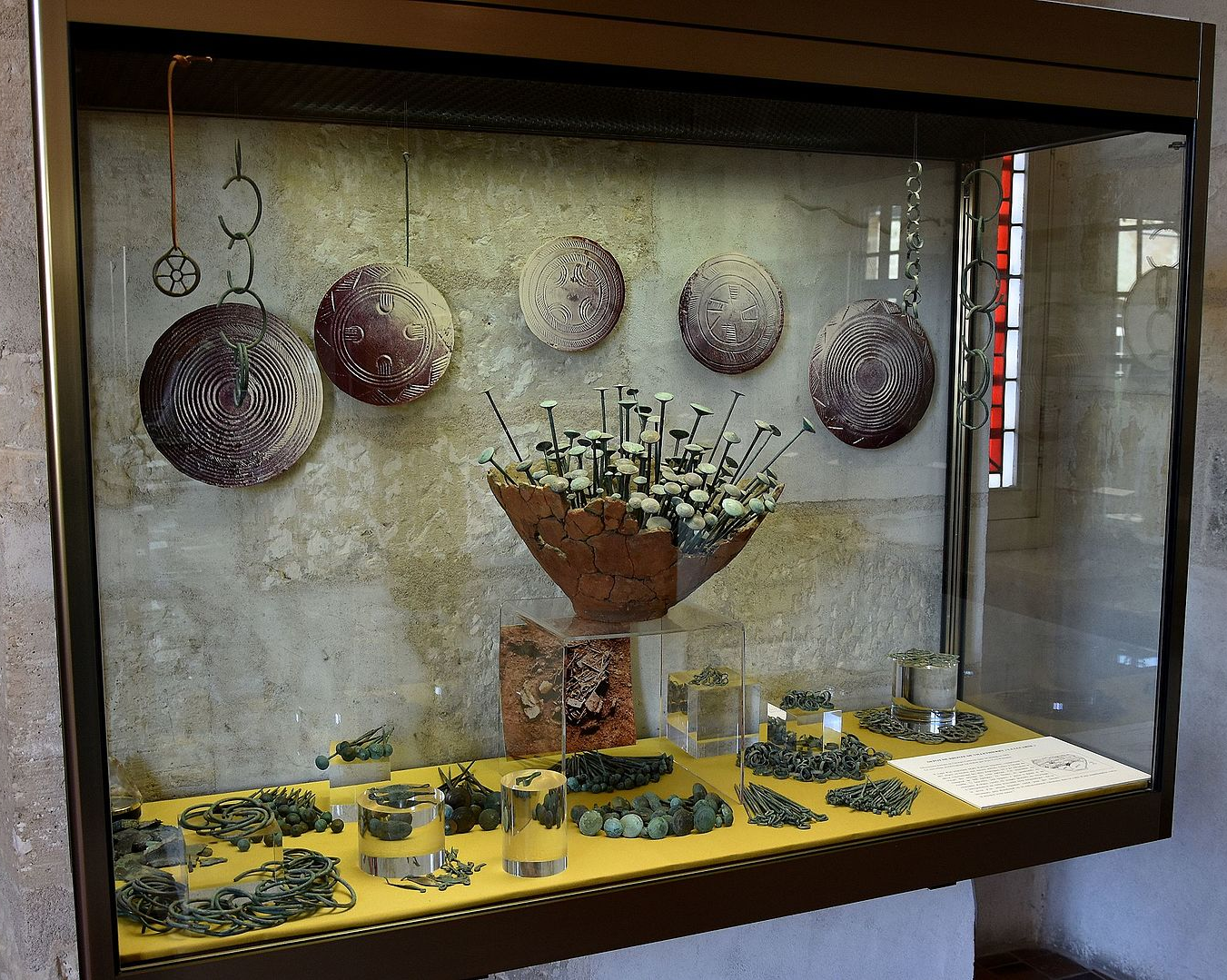
Bronze pins and ornaments, Urnfield culture, c. 1000 BC

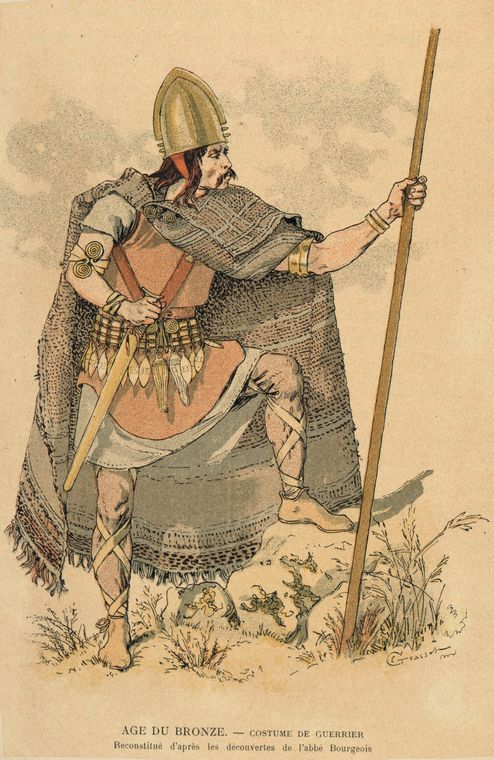
Urnfield culture warrior, reconstruction

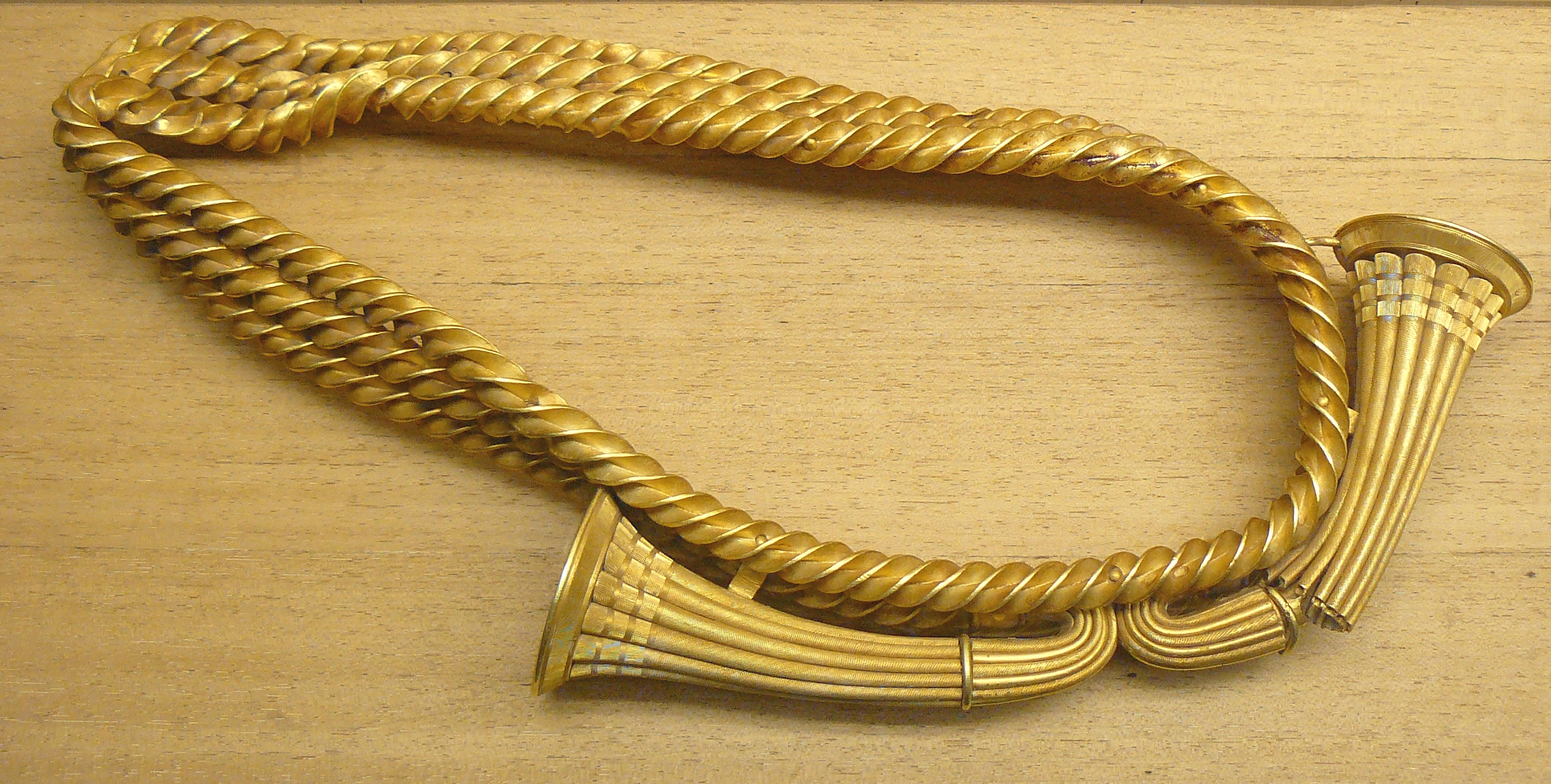
Atlantic Bronze Age, gold belt, 1300-1150 BC

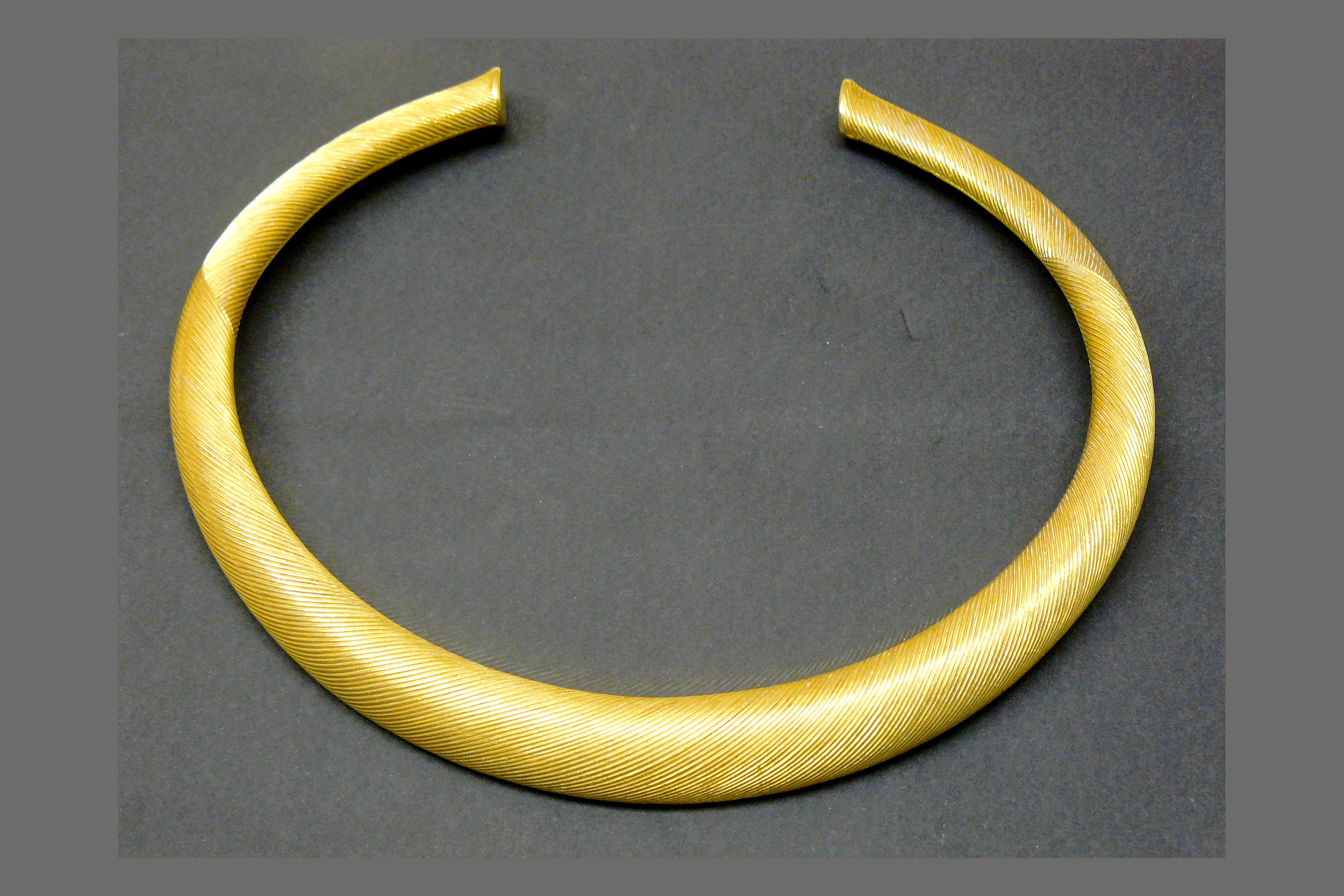
Gold torc, Atlantic Bronze Age, c. 1200-1000 BC.

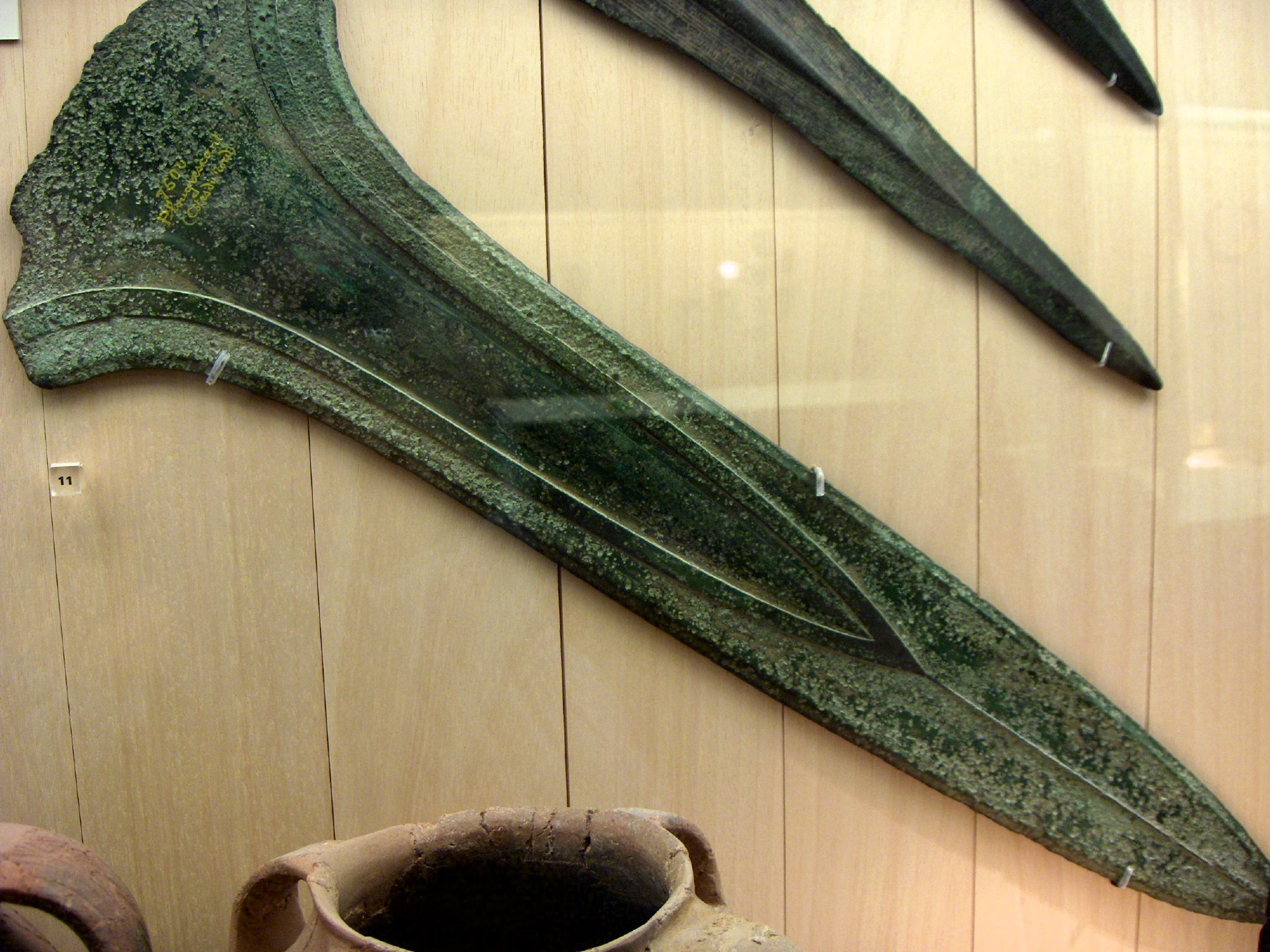
Plougrescant sword, Atlantic Bronze Age, c. 1300 BC

== The Iron Age ==
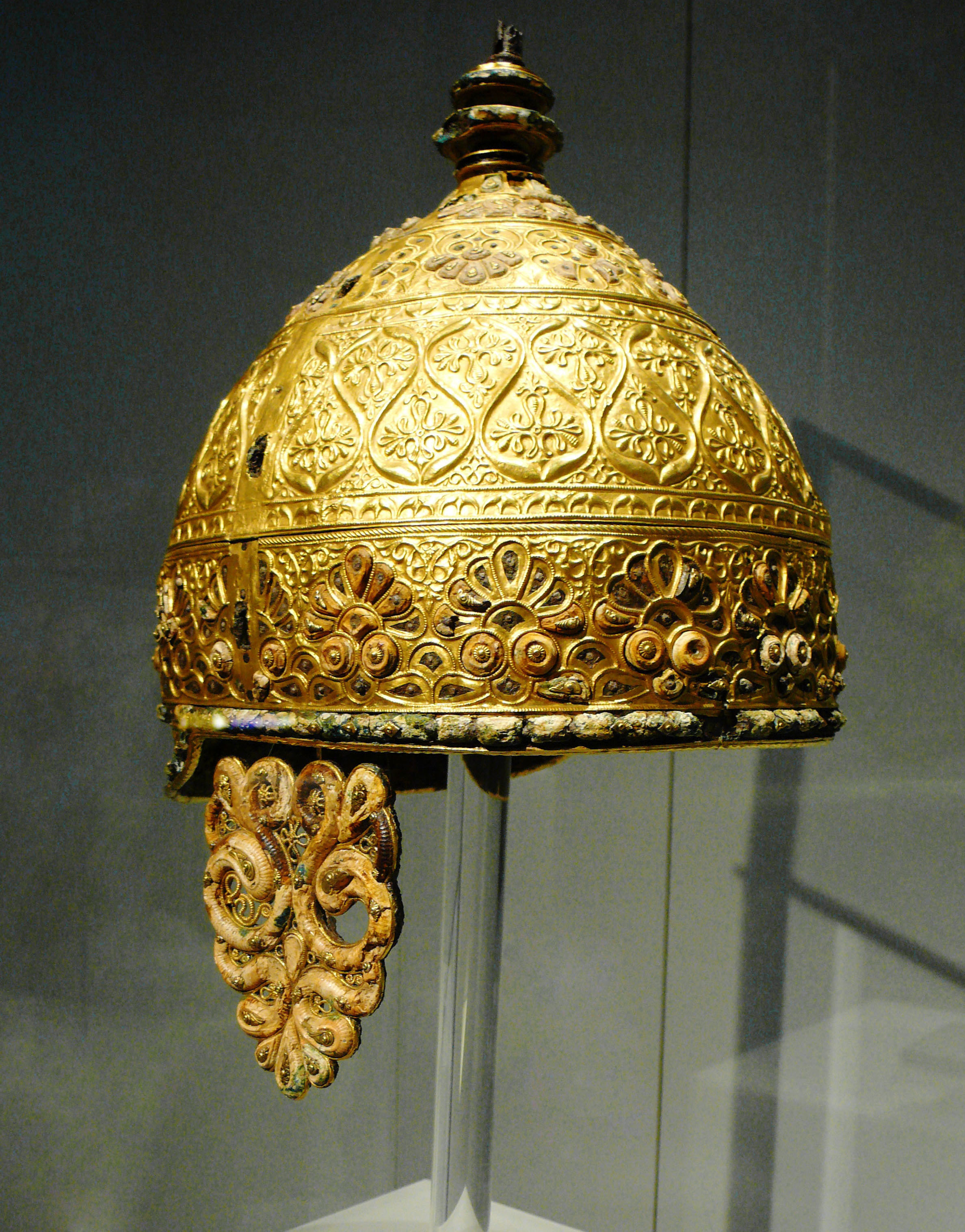
Agris Helmet, La Tène culture, 350 BC

The spread of iron-working led to the development of the Hallstatt culture (c. 700 to 500 BC) directly from the Urnfield. Proto-Celtic, the latest common ancestor of all known Celtic languages, is generally considered to have been spoken at the time of the late Urnfield or early Hallstatt cultures, in the early 1st millennium BC.

The Hallstatt culture was succeeded by the La Tène culture, which developed out of the Hallstatt culture without any definite cultural break, under the impetus of considerable Mediterranean influence from Greek, and later Etruscan civilizations. The La Tène culture developed and flourished during the late Iron Age (from 450 BC to the Roman conquest in the 1st century BC) in eastern France, Switzerland, Austria, southwest Germany, the Czech Republic, and Hungary. Farther to the north extended the contemporary Pre-Roman Iron Age culture of Northern Germany and Scandinavia.

In addition, Greeks and Phoenicians settled outposts like Marseille in this period (c. 600 BC).

By the 2nd century BC, Celtic France was called Gaul by the Romans, and its people were called Gauls. The people to the north (in what is present-day Belgium) were called Belgae (scholars believe this may represent a mixture of Celtic and Germanic elements) and the peoples of the south-west of France were called the Aquitani by the Romans, and may have been Celtiberians or Vascons.

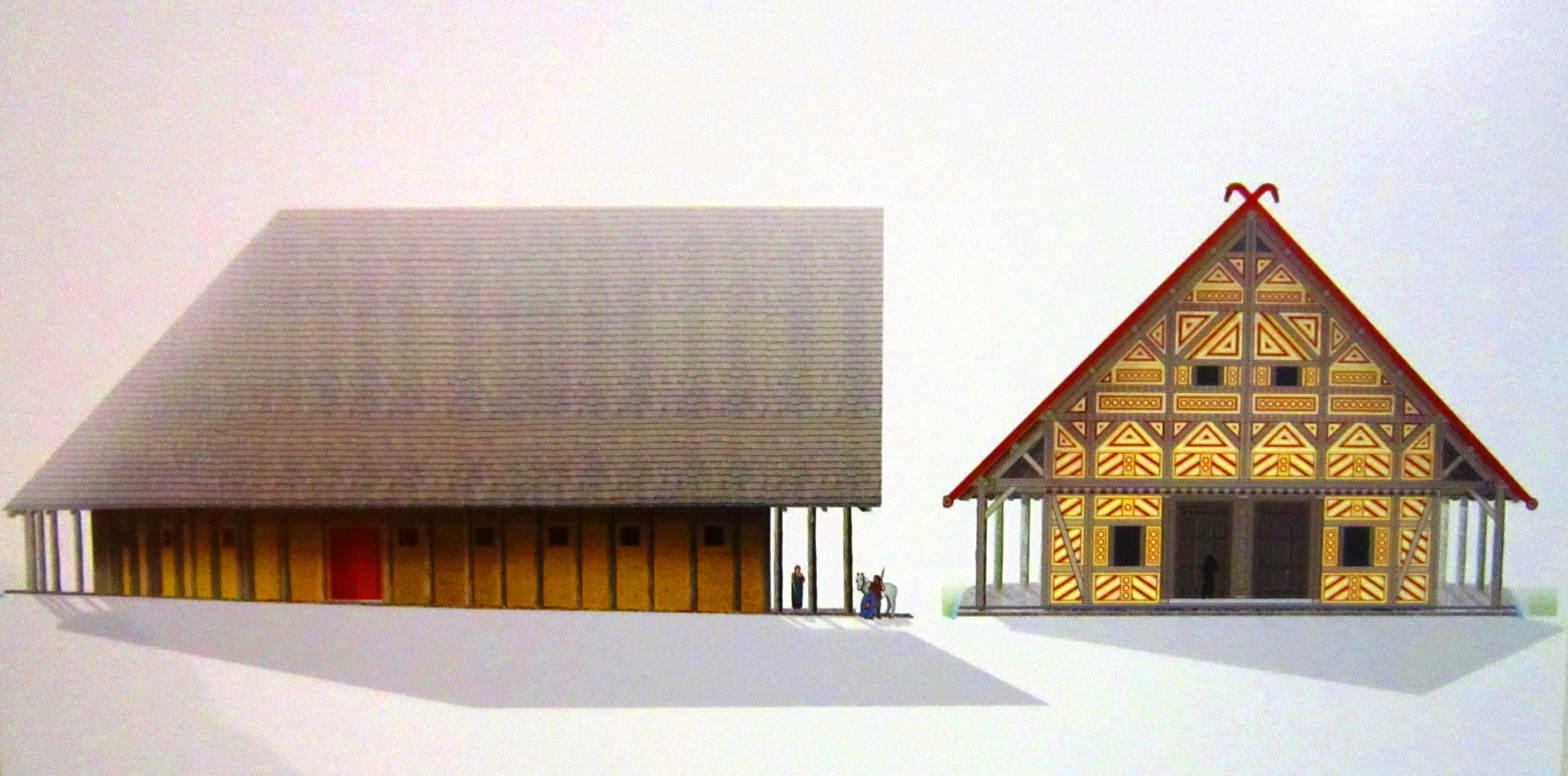
Vix palace, Hallstatt culture, 500 BC

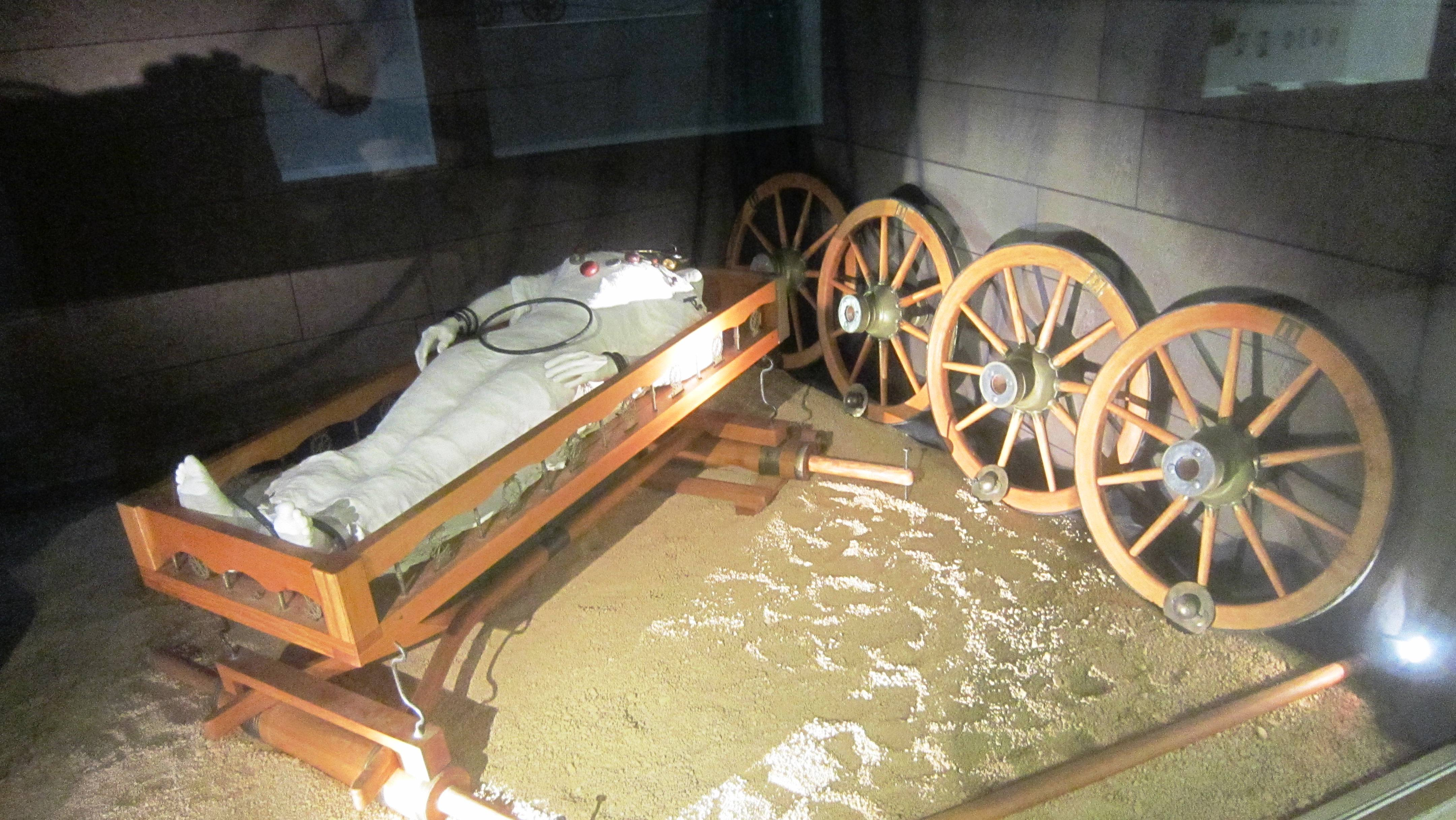
Vix grave, wagon burial reconstruction, Hallstatt culture, 500 BC

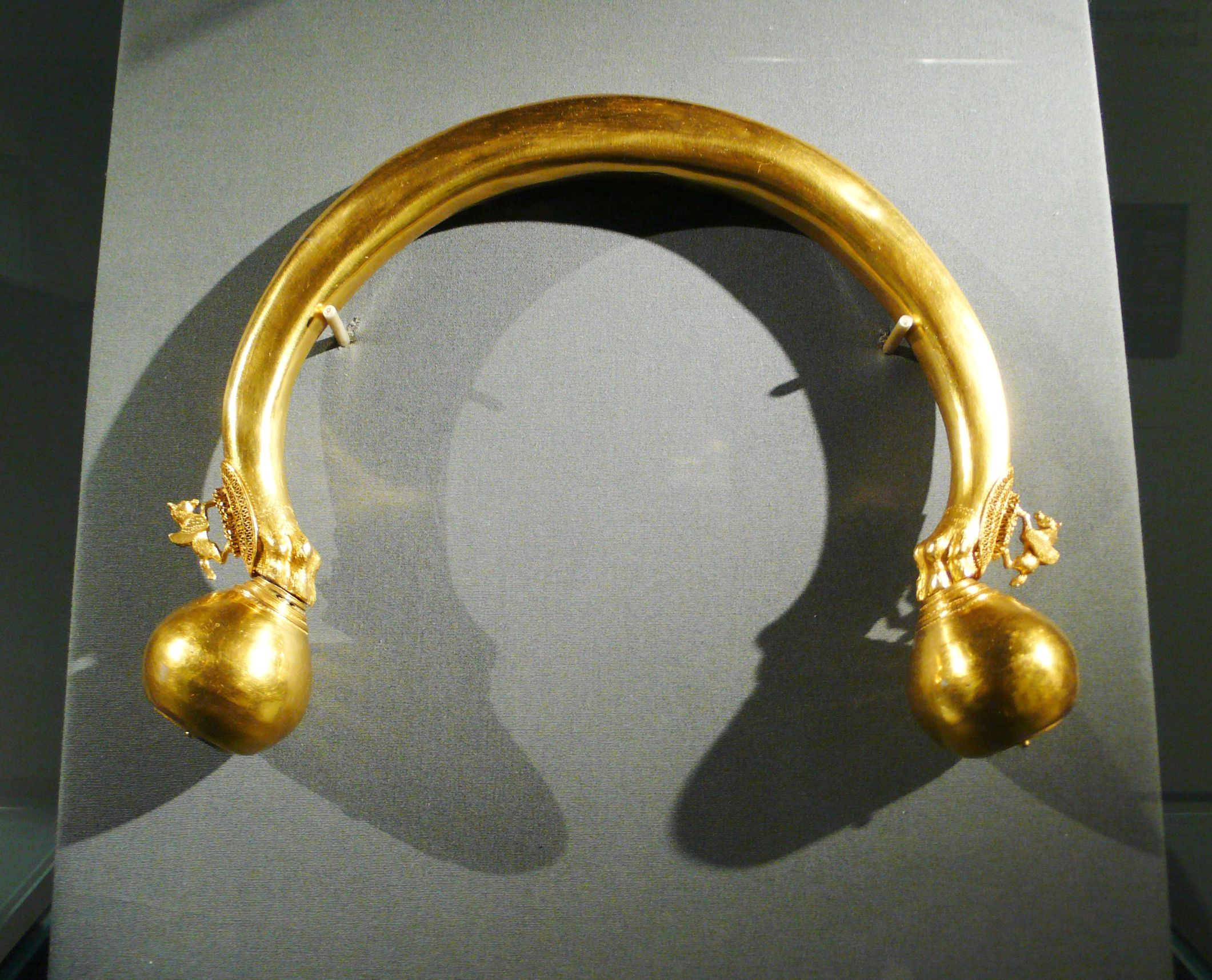
Gold torc from the Vix Grave, 500 BC

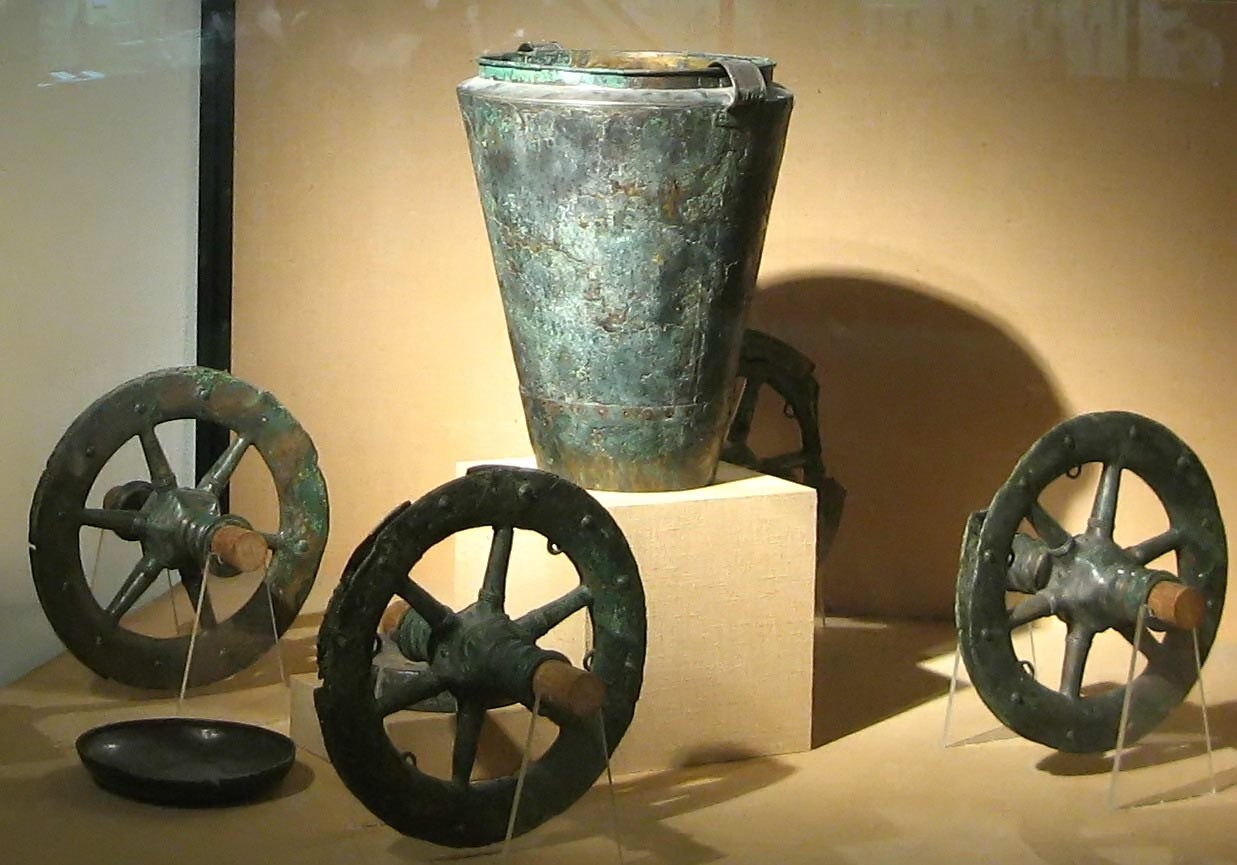
Cult wagon, Hallstatt culture, 750 BC

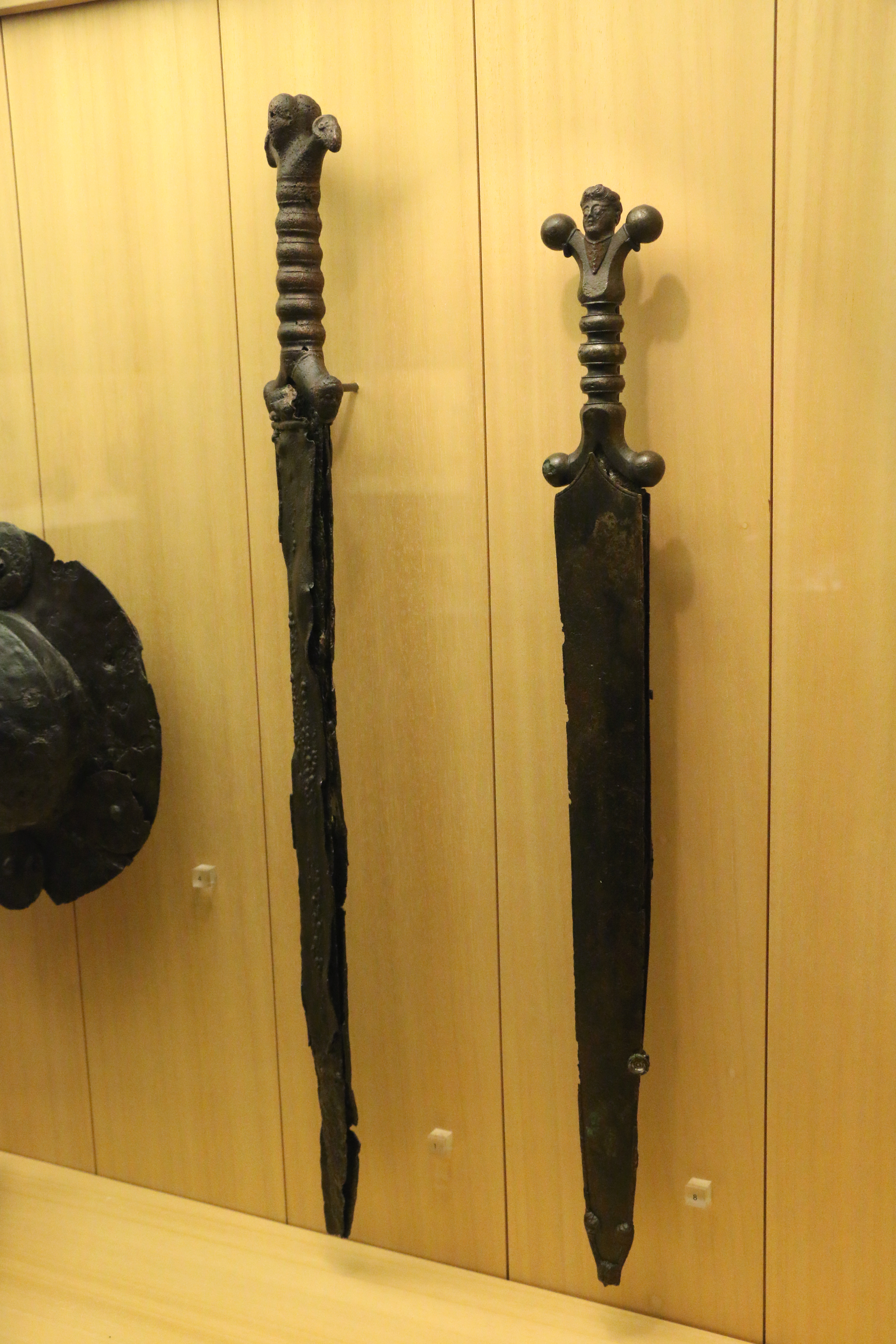
Swords, La Tène culture

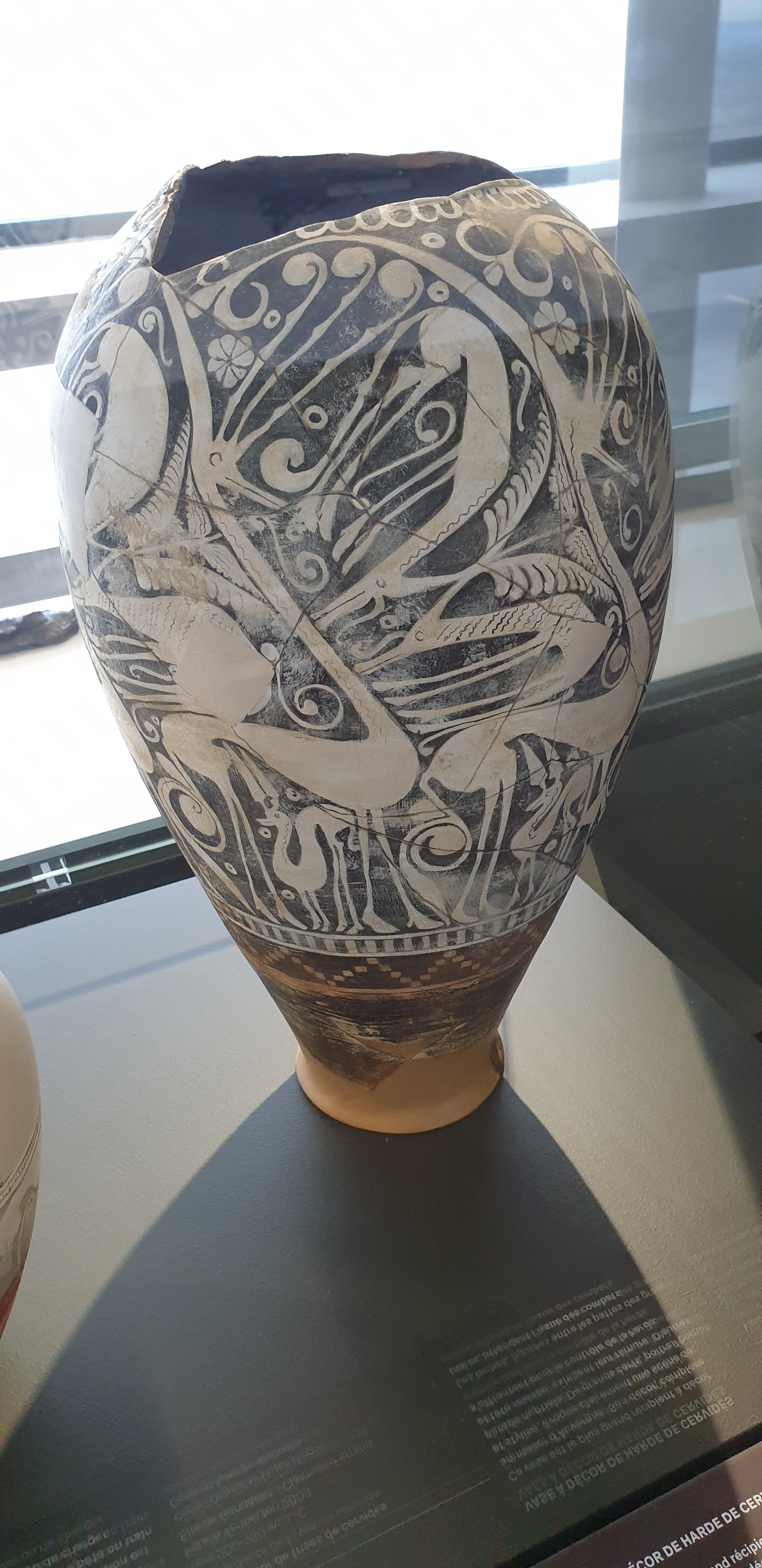
Painted pottery, La Tène culture

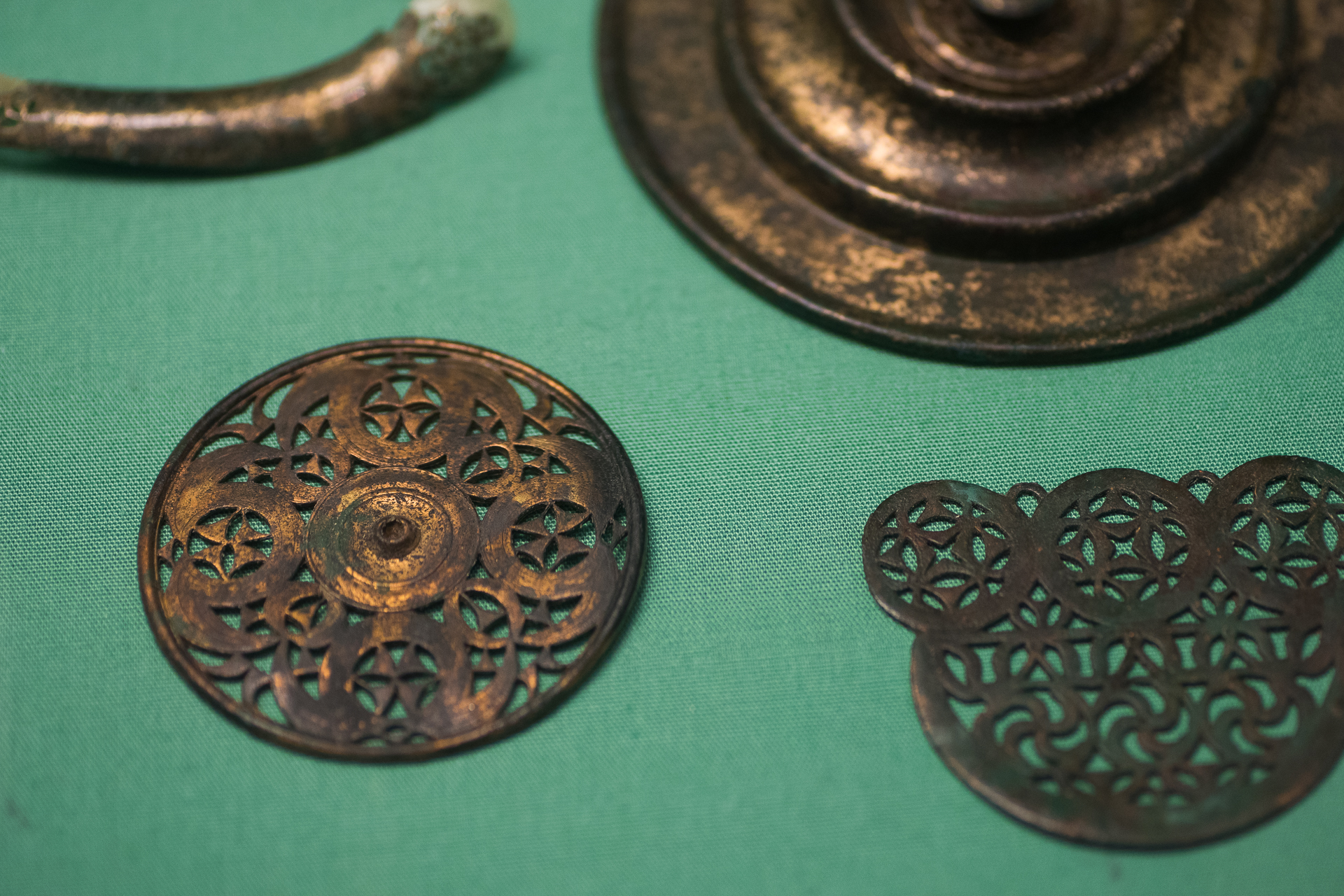
Chariot mounts from Somme-Bionne, La Tène culture

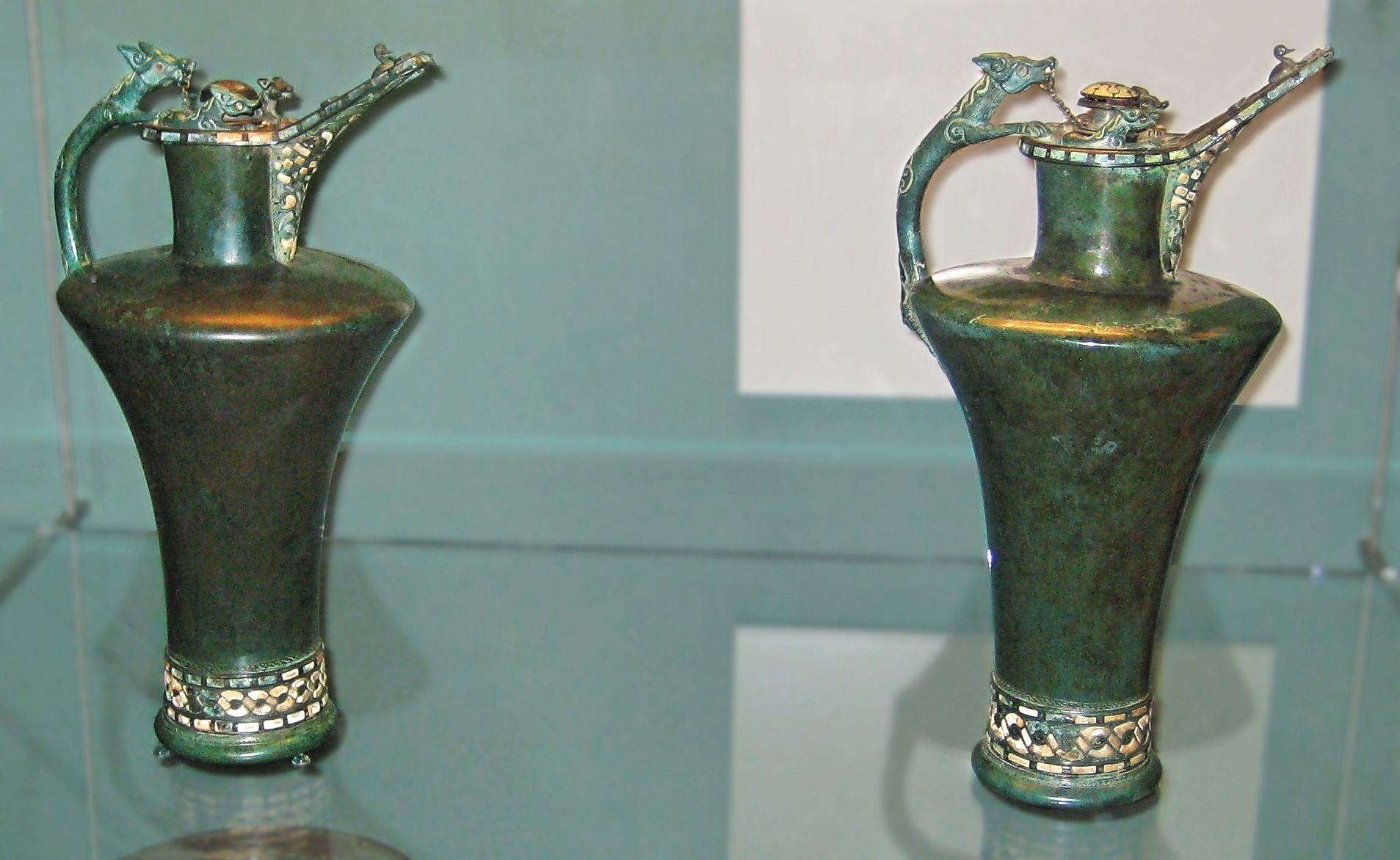
Basse Yutz flagons, La Tène culture, 450 BC

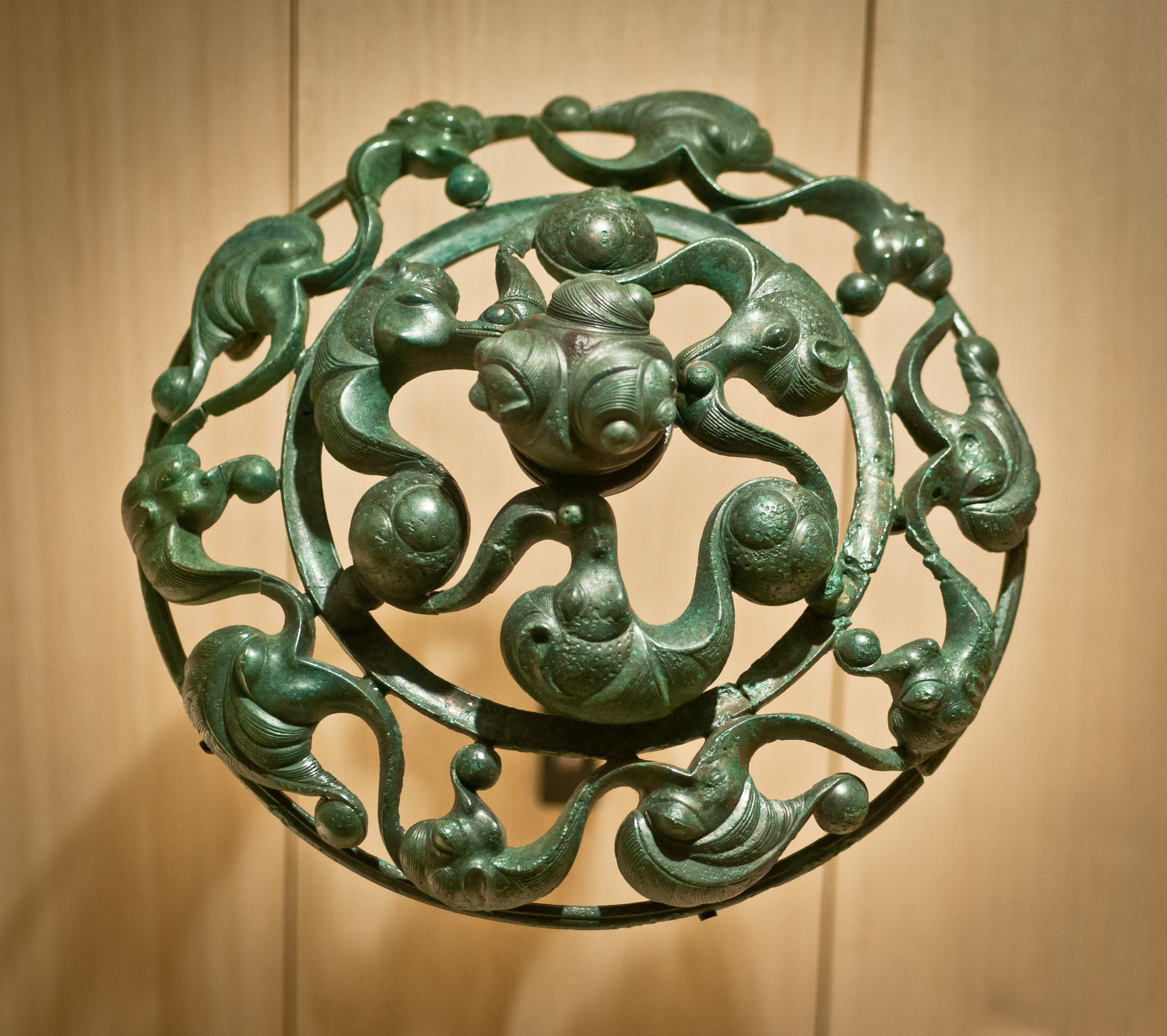
Chariot fitting, La Tène culture

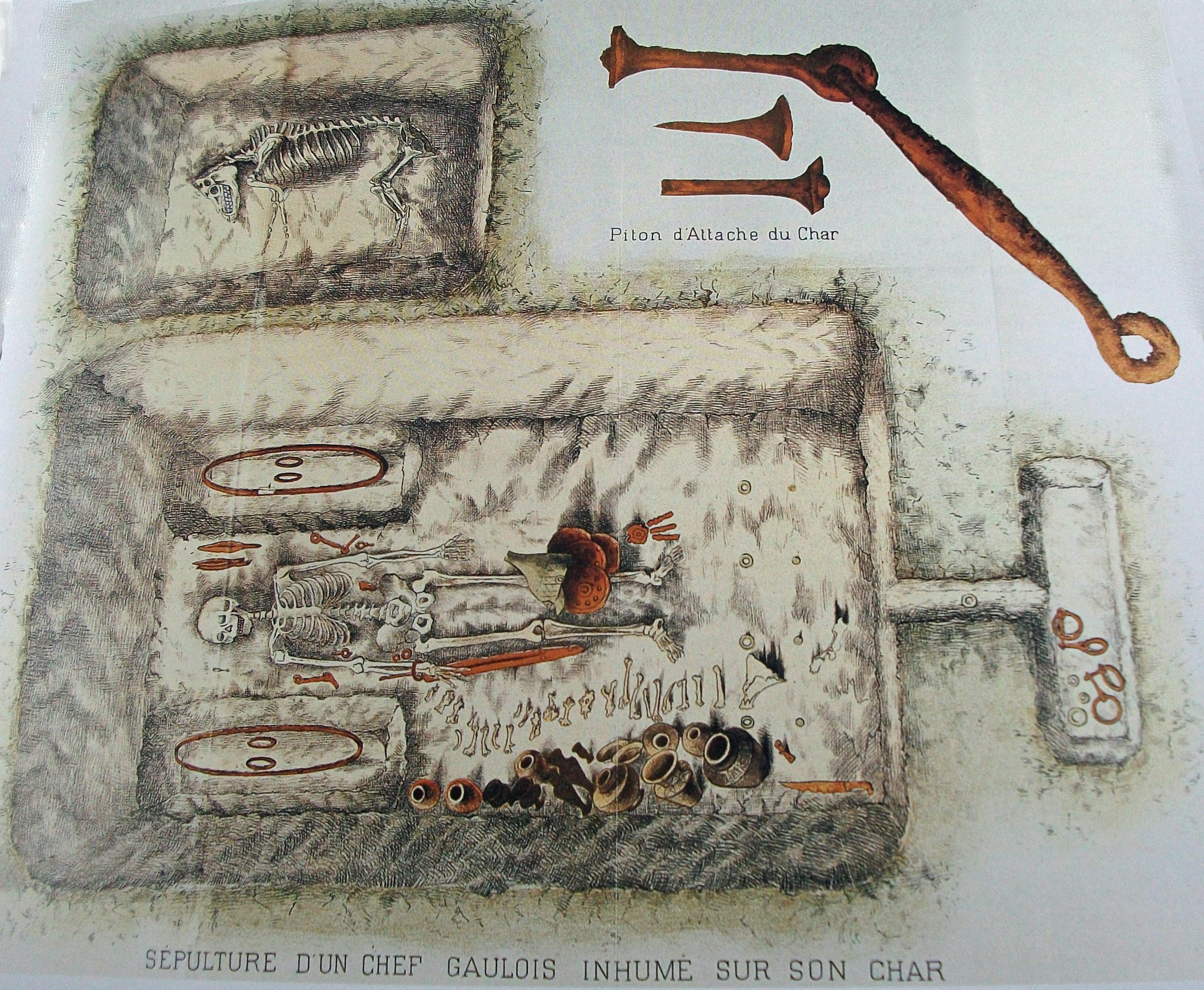
Chariot burial, La Tène culture

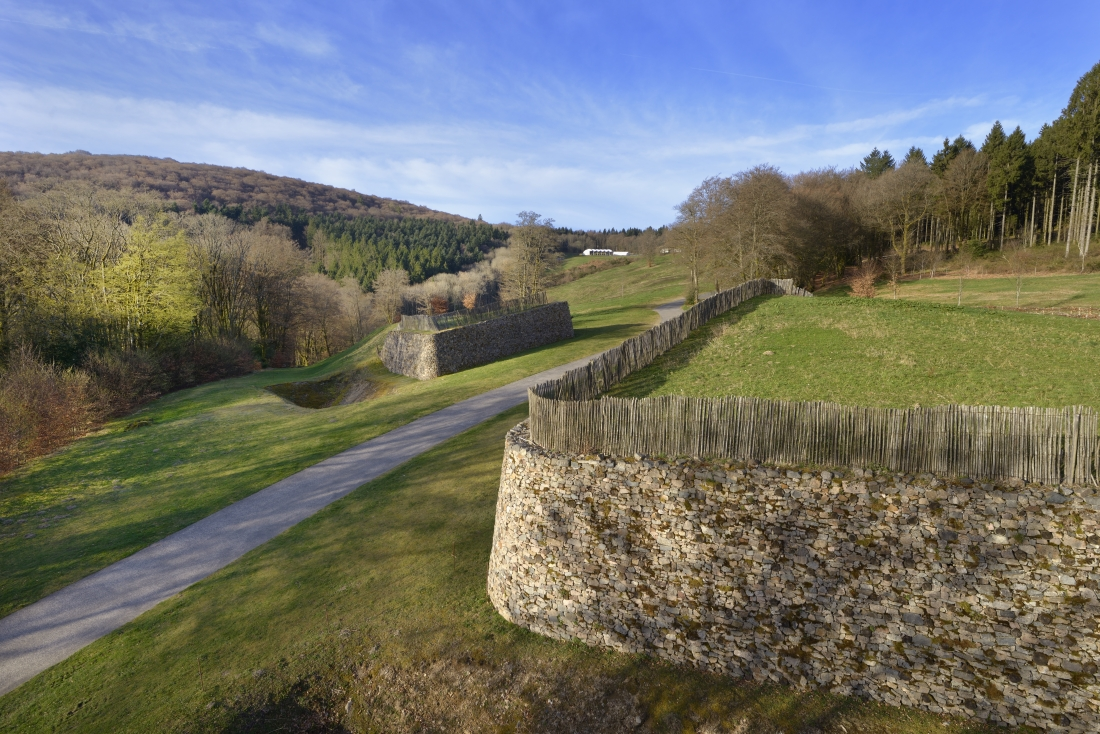
Bibracte oppidum, outer walls, La Tène culture

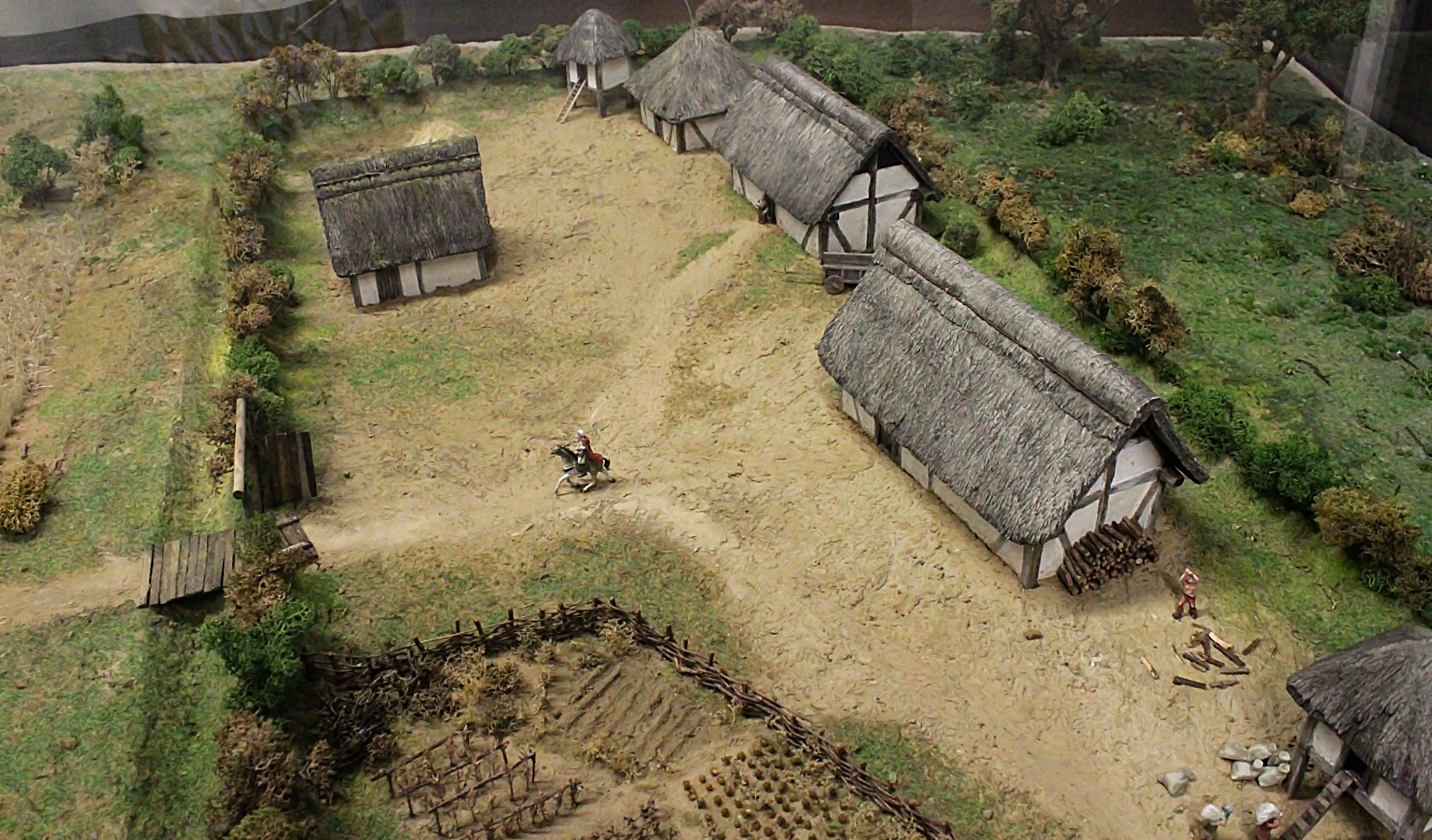
Gallic farm at Verberie, La Tène culture

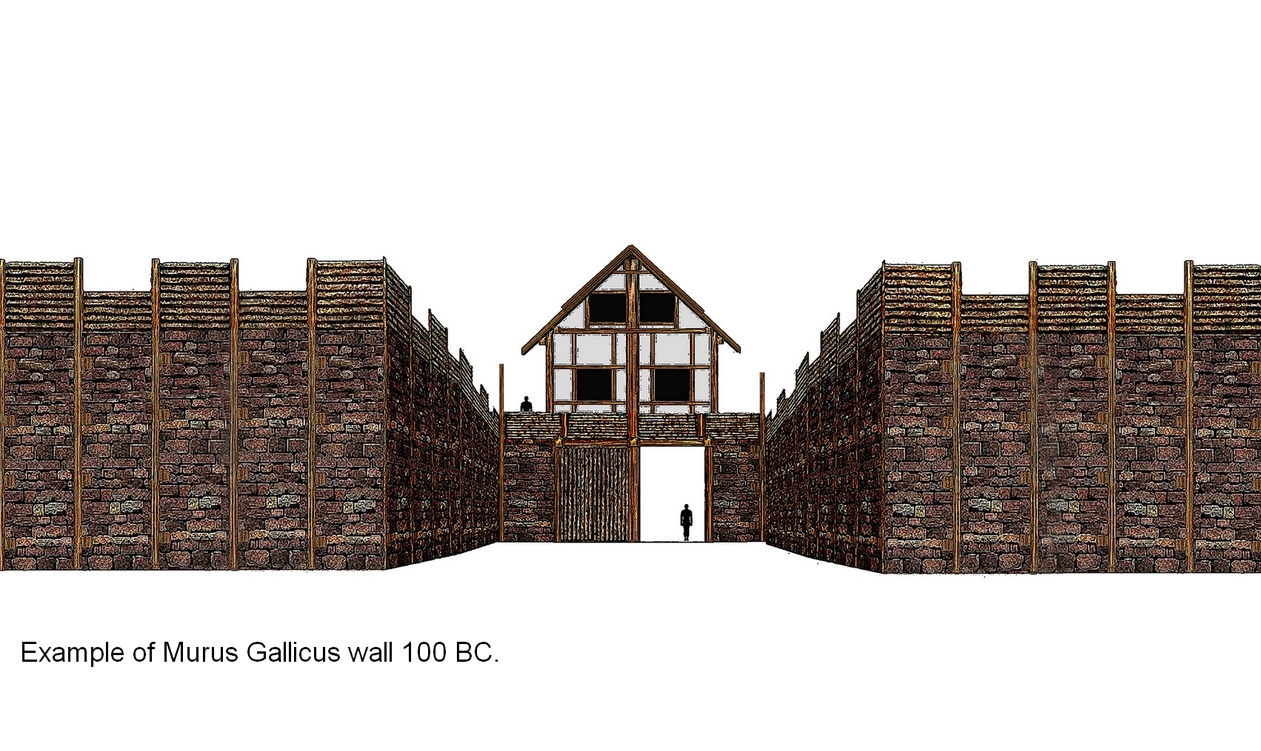
Murus Gallicus, c. 100 BC, La Tène culture

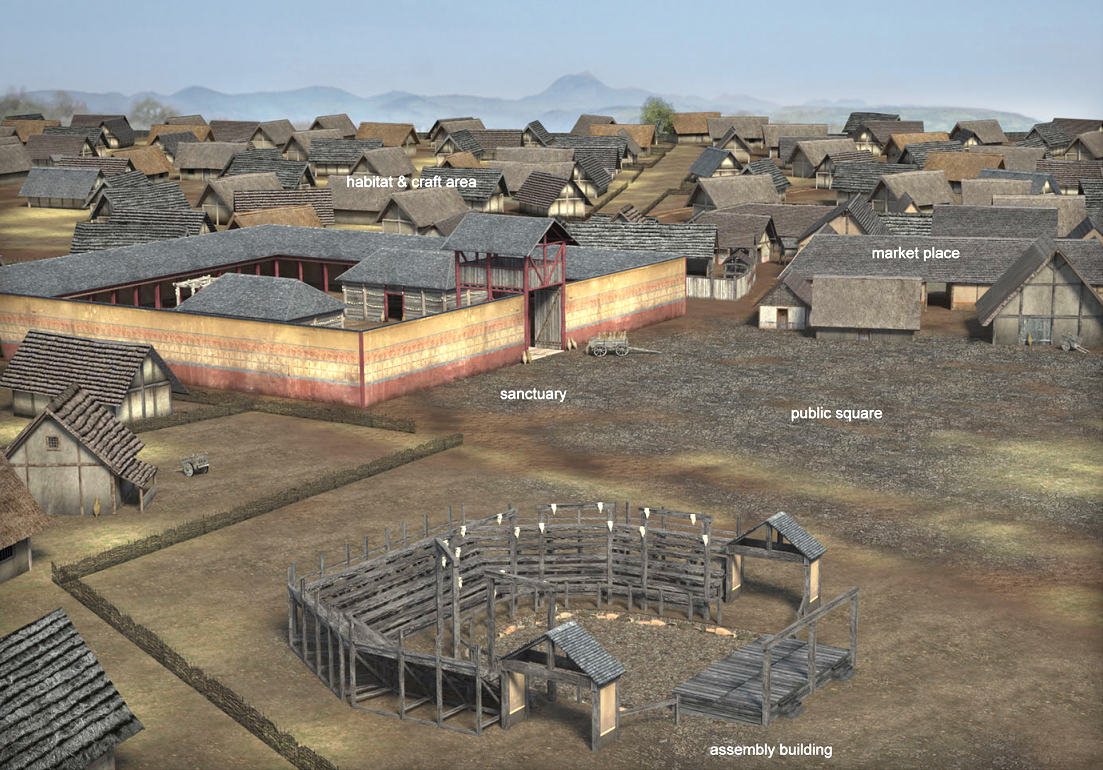
Corent oppidum, La Tène culture

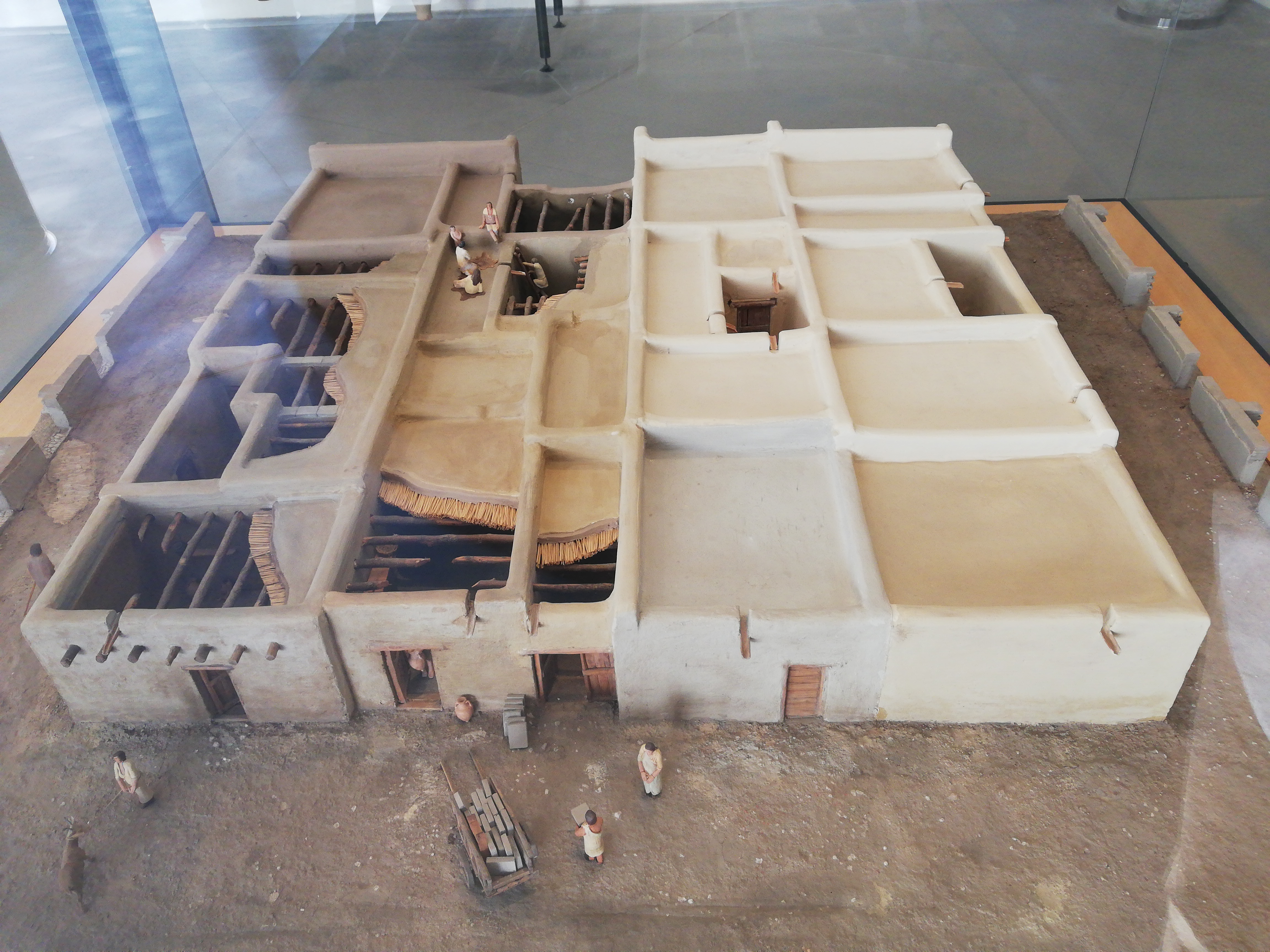
Settlement at Arles, c. 2nd century BC

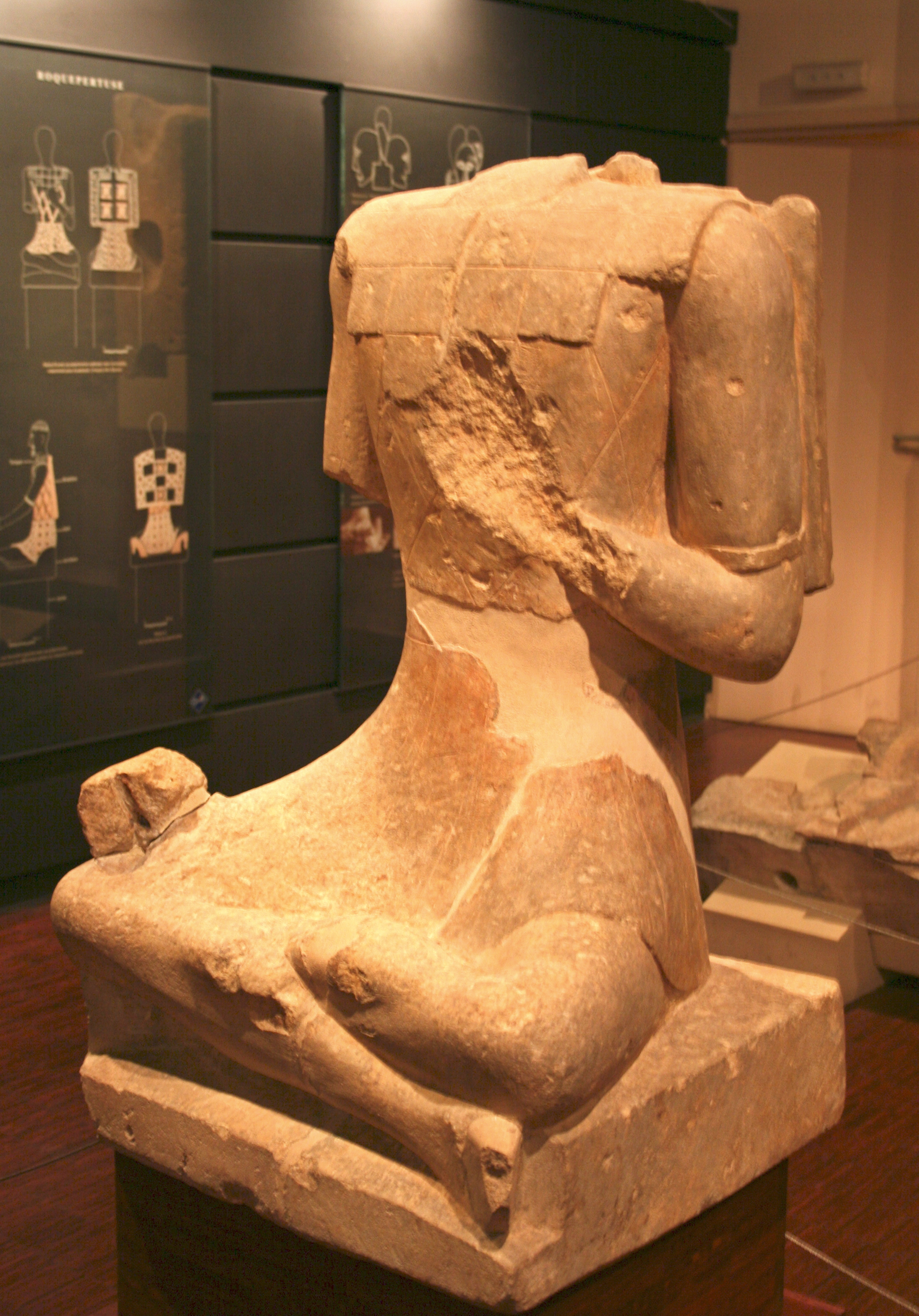
Statue from Roquepertuse, 3rd–2nd century BC

== Timeline ==
Europe in c. 5500-4500 BC

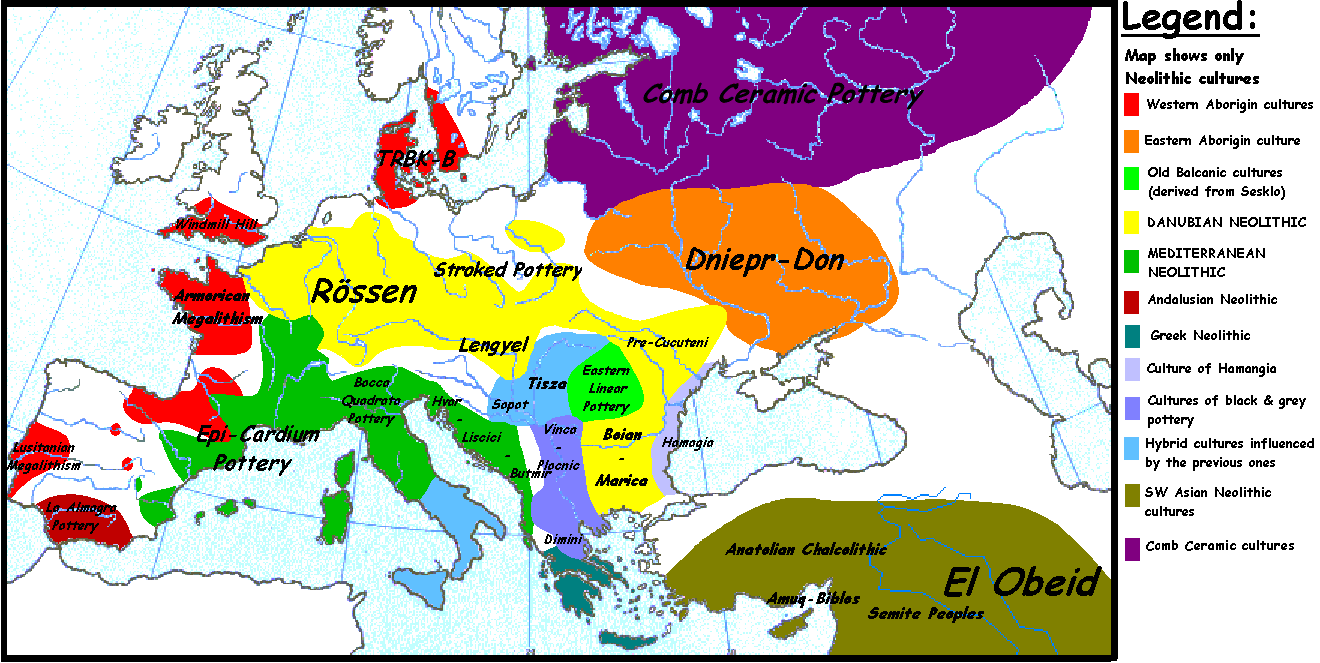
Europe in c. 4500-3500 BC

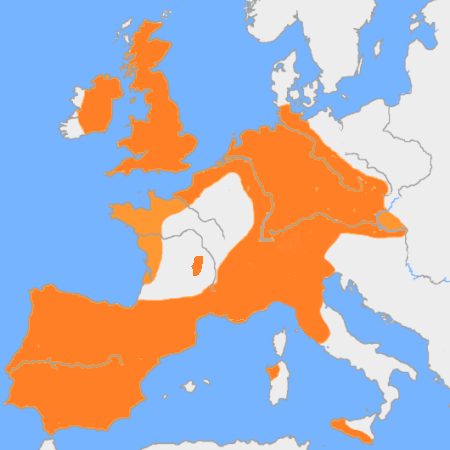
Extent of the Beaker culture (c. 2800–1900 BC)

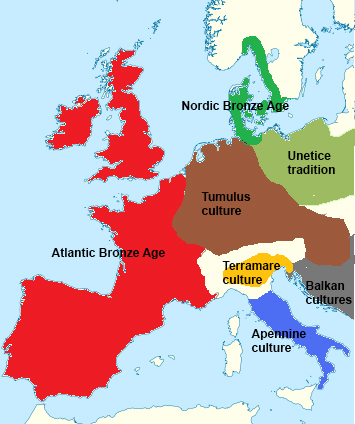
Europe in the Middle Bronze Age

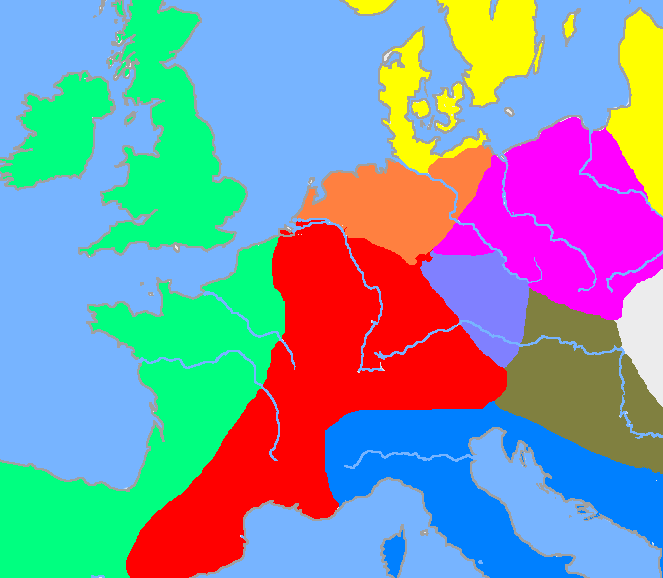
Europe c. 1200 BC, showing the central Urnfield culture (red), the northern Urnfield culture (orange), the Lusatian culture (purple), the Danubian culture (brown), the Terramare culture (blue), the Atlantic Bronze Age (green) and the Nordic Bronze Age (yellow).

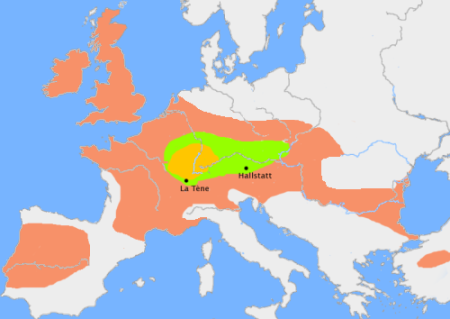
The green area suggests a possible extent of (proto-)Celtic influence around 1000 BC. The orange area shows the region of birth of the La Tène style. The red area indicates an idea of the possible region of Celtic influence around 400 BC.

Prehistoric and Iron Age France - all dates are BC

- 1,800,000 (Date not considered secure) : Appearance of stone tools (possibly by Homo erectus) in France (Chilhac, Haute-Loire).
- 1,570,000: Stone tools at Lézignan-la-Cèbe.
- 1,050,000 to 1,000,000: stone tools at Grotte du Vallonnet, near Menton.
- 900,000: Beginning of Günz glaciation.
- 700,000: Oldest shaped tools in Brittany.
- 600,000: Beginning of Günz-Mindel interglacial. Appearance of Homo heidelbergensis in Europe.
- 450,000: "Tautavel man" (possibly Homo heidelbergensis).
- 410,000: Beginning of Mindel glaciation (Mindel I). Abbevillian culture, taming of fire.
- 400,000: Mindel II. Shards of "proto-Levallois" tools.
- 400,000 to 380,000: Traces of first domestication of fire at Terra Amata (Nice).
- 300,000: Beginning of Mindel-Riss interglacial.
- 300,000: Appearance of Neanderthals in Europe.
- 200,000: Beginning of Riss glaciation.
- 130,000: Beginning of Riss-Würm interglacial.
- 70,000: Beginning of Würm glaciation.
- 62,000: Würm I/II interglacial.
- 57,000: Brorup interglacial.
- 55,000: Würm II.
- 40,000: Laufen interglacial. Arrival of first modern humans (Cro-Magnons) in Europe.
- 35,000: Würm IIIa. Châtelperronian culture.
- 33,000: Mask of la Roche-Cotard, a Mousterian artefact.
- 32,000: Aurignacian culture.
- 30,000: First statuettes and engravings in France. Disappearance of Neanderthals.
- 28,000: Arcy interglacial.
- 27,500: Würm IIIb.
- 25,000: Paudorf interglacial.
- 23,000: Würm IIIc.
- 18,000: End of Würm glaciation.
- 18,692: Beginning of Solutrean culture.
- 16,000: Cold spell (Oldest Dryas).
- 15,000: Magdalenian culture.
- 15,300: Lascaux.
- 14,500: Middle Magdalenian. Bølling Oscillation.
- 14,100: Cold spell (Older Dryas).
- 14,000: Allerød Oscillation.
- 13,500: Upper Magdalenian.
- 13,000: Hamburg culture
- 10,300: Cold spell (Younger Dryas).
- 9500: Beginning of Holocene.
- 7000: Domestication of the sheep.
- 6900: Domestication of the dog.
- 5000: Appearance of Linear Pottery culture in France.
- 4650: Oldest neolithic village in France, Courthézon in the Vaucluse.
- 4000: Neolithic Chasséen culture village of Bercy.
- 3610: Appearance of first megaliths in France.
- 3430: Chasséen culture village of Saint-Michel du Touch near Toulouse.
- 3430: Appearance of Rössen culture at Baume de Gonvilla in Haute-Saône.
- 3250: Expansion of Chasséen culture in the south of France, from the Lot to the Vaucluse.
- 3190: Chasséen culture in Calvados.
- 2530: Chasséen culture in Pas-de-Calais.
- 2450: End of Chasséen culture in Eure-et-Loir.
- 2400: End of Chasséen culture in Saint-Mitre (in Reillanne, Alpes-de-Haute-Provence).
- 2300: Village at Ponteau (in Martigues, Provence) of the Beaker culture.
- 1800: Beginning of Bronze Age in France.
- 800: Appearance in France, via the Rhine and the Moselle, and expanding into Champagne and Bourgogne of the Urnfield culture.
- 725: Beginning of Hallstatt culture.
- 680: Founding of Antibes, the first Greek colony in France.
- 600: Founding of Massalia (future Marseille) by the Greeks from the Ionian city of Phocaea.
- 450: The Celts of la Tène appear in Champagne. They expand to the Garonne, forming what will come to be called the Gaul civilization.
- 390: The Celtic chief Brennus sacks Rome.
- 121: Roman occupation of Gallia Narbonensis.
- 118: Founding of the Roman colony Narbo Martius (future Narbonne).
- 58-51: Conquest of Gaul by Julius Caesar.

== See also ==
- Timeline of glaciation
- Neolithic Europe
- Old European culture
- Proto-Indo-Europeans
- Proto-Celtic language
- Prehistory of Brittany
- Prehistoric Britain
- Prehistoric Iberia
- Prehistoric Romania
- Archaeological sites in France

== Sources ==
- Airvaux, Jean; Despriée, Jackie; Turq, Alain; et al. (2012). "Premières présences humaines en France entre 1,2 et 0,5 million d'années". Academia (in French).
- Thom, Alexander; Thom, Archibald Stevenson (1978). Megalithic Remains in Britain and Brittany. Clarendon Press. ISBN 978-0-19-858156-7.
- Anthony, David W. (26 July 2010). The Horse, the Wheel, and Language: How Bronze-Age Riders from the Eurasian Steppes Shaped the Modern World. Princeton University Press. ISBN 978-1-4008-3110-4.
- Armbruster, Barbara (2013). "Gold and gold working of the Bronze Age". The Oxford Handbook of the European Bronze Age. pp. 454–468. doi:10.1093/OXFORDHB/9780199572861.013.0025.
- "The Thaïs Bone, France". UNESCO Portal to the Heritage of Astronomy.
- Barras, Colin (27 March 2019). "Story of most murderous people of all time revealed in ancient DNA". New Scientist.
- Bindon, Peter (1995). "Tephrofacts and the first human occupation of the French Massif Central". Proceedings of the European Science Foundation Workshop at Tautaval (France), 1993: 129–146.
- Bourguignon, Laurence (2008). Les sociétés du Paléolithique dans un grand Sud-Ouest de la France : nouveaux gisements, nouveaux résultats, nouvelles méthodes: journées SPF, Université Bordeaux 1, Talence, 24-25 novembre 2006 (in French). Paris: Société préhistorique française. ISBN 978-2-913745-37-7.
- Champagne, Fernand; Champagne, Christian; Jauzon, Pierre; et al. (1990). "Le site préhistorique des Fieux à Miers (Lot) [Etat actuel de la recherche]: Etat actuel de la recherche". Gallia préhistoire. 32 (1): 1–28. doi:10.3406/galip.1990.2275.
- Cassen, Serge; Grimaud, V; Lescop, L; et al. (2014). "The first radiocarbon dates for the construction and use of the interior of the monument at Gavrinis (Lamor-Baden, France)". Past: The Newsletter of the Prehistoric Society. 77. University College London: 1–4.
- Chopin, Jean-François; Gomez de Soto, José (2014). "Fragment de lame d'épée ou de poignard du type de Tréboul-Saint-Brandan du site du Perrou 2 à Maillé (Indre-et-Loire)". Bulletin de la Société préhistorique française. 111 (3): 530–533. doi:10.3406/bspf.2014.14439. S2CID 194679648.
- Conneller, Chantal; Bayliss, Alex; Milner, Nicky; Taylor, Barry (2016). "The Resettlement of the British Landscape: Towards a chronology of Early Mesolithic lithic assemblage types". Internet Archaeology. 42 (42). doi:10.11141/ia.42.12. hdl:10034/621138.
- d'Anna, André; Bosansky, Christiane; Bellot-Gurlet, Ludovic; et al. (2015). "Les stèles gravées néolithiques de Beyssan à Gargas (Vaucluse)". Bulletin de la Société préhistorique française. 112 (4): 761–768. doi:10.3406/bspf.2015.14599.
- Déchelette, Joseph (1910). Manuel d'archéologie préhistorique celtique et gallo-romaine: Archéologie celtique ou protohistorique. second Âge du fer ou époque de la Tène (in French). Librairie A. Picard. ISBN 978-0-576-19993-3.
- Defleur, Alban R.; Desclaux, Emmanuel (April 2019). "Impact of the last interglacial climate change on ecosystems and Neanderthals behavior at Baume Moula-Guercy, Ardèche, France". Journal of Archaeological Science. 104: 114–124. Bibcode:2019JArSc.104..114D. doi:10.1016/j.jas.2019.01.002. S2CID 133992282.
- Dickson, D. Bruce (July 1992). The Dawn of Belief: Religion in the Upper Paleolithic of Southwestern Europe. University of Arizona Press. ISBN 978-0-8165-1336-9.
- Dufau, Jean; Favarel, Jacques; Séronie-Vivien, M. (2004). "Un site pléistocène moyen à hominidé en Quercy: La grotte de Pradayrol à Caniac-du-Causse (Lot)" (in French). S2CID 190002964.
- Ebel, Charles (1976). "Chapter 2, Massilia and Rome before 390 B.C.". Transalpine Gaul: the emergence of a Roman province. Brill Archive. pp. 5–16. ISBN 90-04-04384-5.,
- Fischer, Claire-Elise; Pemonge, Marie-Hélène; Ducoussau, Isaure; et al. (April 2022). "Origin and mobility of Iron Age Gaulish groups in present-day France revealed through archaeogenomics". iScience. 25 (4) 104094. Bibcode:2022iSci...25j4094F. doi:10.1016/j.isci.2022.104094. PMC 8983337. PMID 35402880.
- Flores-Bello, André; Bauduer, Frédéric; Salaberria, Jasone; et al. (May 2021). "Genetic origins, singularity, and heterogeneity of Basques". Current Biology. 31 (10): 2167–2177.e4. Bibcode:2021CBio...31E2167F. doi:10.1016/j.cub.2021.03.010. hdl:10230/52292. PMID 33770488. S2CID 232359452.
- Gascó́, Jean (1951- ) Auteur du texte (2000). "L'Âge du bronze dans la moitié sud de la France / Jean Gascó́". Histoire de la France préhistorique.
- Haak, Wolfgang; Lazaridis, Iosif; Patterson, Nick; et al. (11 June 2015). "Massive migration from the steppe was a source for Indo-European languages in Europe". Nature. 522 (7555): 207–211. arXiv:1502.02783. Bibcode:2015Natur.522..207H. doi:10.1038/nature14317. ISSN 0028-0836. PMC 5048219. PMID 25731166.
- Hatt, Jean-Jacques (1958). "Chronique de protohistoire, IV. Nouveau projet de chronologie pour l'âge du Bronze en France". Bulletin de la Société préhistorique française. 55 (5): 304–306. doi:10.3406/bspf.1958.3663.
- Jones, Tim (17 December 2009). "Lithic Assemblage Dated to 1.57 Million Years Found at Lézignan-la-Cébe, Southern France «". Anthropology.net. Archived from the original on 24 September 2015.
- Joussaume, Roger (1988). Dolmens for the dead: megalith-building throughout the world. London: Batsford. ISBN 978-0-7134-5369-0.
- Klein, Richard G. (22 April 2009). The Human Career: Human Biological and Cultural Origins, Third Edition. University of Chicago Press. ISBN 978-0-226-02752-4.
- Les Sépultures néandertaliennes: colloque: Nice, vendredi 17 septembre 1976 (in French). Centre national de la recherche scientifique. 1976.
- Librado, Pablo (2021). "The origins and spread of domestic horses from the Western Eurasian steppes". Nature. 598 (7882): 634–640. Bibcode:2021Natur.598..634L. doi:10.1038/s41586-021-04018-9. PMC 8550961. PMID 34671162.
- Lumley, Henry de,. (2009). La grande histoire des premiers hommes européens. Paris: O. Jacob. ISBN 978-2-7381-2386-2.
- "Le dépôt de Blanot". archeologie.dijon.fr.
- "Doggerland - The Europe That Was | National Geographic Society". education.nationalgeographic.org. National Geographic Society.
- Nougier, Louis-René (1963). La préhistoire: essai de paléosociologie religieuse (in French). Bloud & Gay.
- Postel, B (2008). "Neandertal et la mort | Archéologia n° 458". www.archeologia-magazine.com (in French) (458): 6–11.
- Price, Michael (9 February 2022). "Did Neanderthals and modern humans take turns living in a French cave?". www.science.org.
- Rozoy, J. (1 January 1998). "The (Re-) population of Northern France between 13,000 and 8000 BP". Quaternary International. 49–50 (1): 69–86. Bibcode:1998QuInt..49...69R. doi:10.1016/S1040-6182(97)00054-2.
- Sankararaman, Sriram; Patterson, Nick; Li, Heng; Pääbo, Svante; Reich, David (2012). "The date of interbreeding between Neandertals and modern humans". arXiv:1208.2238 [q-bio.PE].
- Savatier, François (2019). "Des Néandertaliens cannibales dans la vallée du Rhône". Pourlascience.fr (in French).
- Slimak, L.; Zanolli, C.; Higham, T.; et al. (2022). "Modern human incursion into Neanderthal territories 54,000 years ago at Mandrin, France". Science Advances. 8 (6) eabj9496. Bibcode:2022SciA....8J9496S. doi:10.1126/sciadv.abj9496. PMC 8827661. PMID 35138885.
- Slimak, Ludovic; Zanolli, Clément (11 February 2022). "Modern human incursion into Neanderthal territories 54,000 years ago at Mandrin, France". Science Advances. 8 (6) eabj9496. Bibcode:2022SciA....8J9496S. doi:10.1126/sciadv.abj9496. hdl:2440/134613. ISSN 2375-2548. PMC 8827661. PMID 35138885.
- "Stratigraphische Tabelle von Deutschland 2016" (PDF). www.stratigraphie.de. Deutsche Stratigraphische Kommission.
- Thorpe, Nick (2015). "The Atlantic Mesolithic-Neolithic Transition". In Fowler, Chris (ed.). The Oxford Handbook of Neolithic Europe. Oxford University Press. p. 221. ISBN 978-0-19-166688-9.
