= Prehistoric Ireland =

Ireland until c. 400 AD

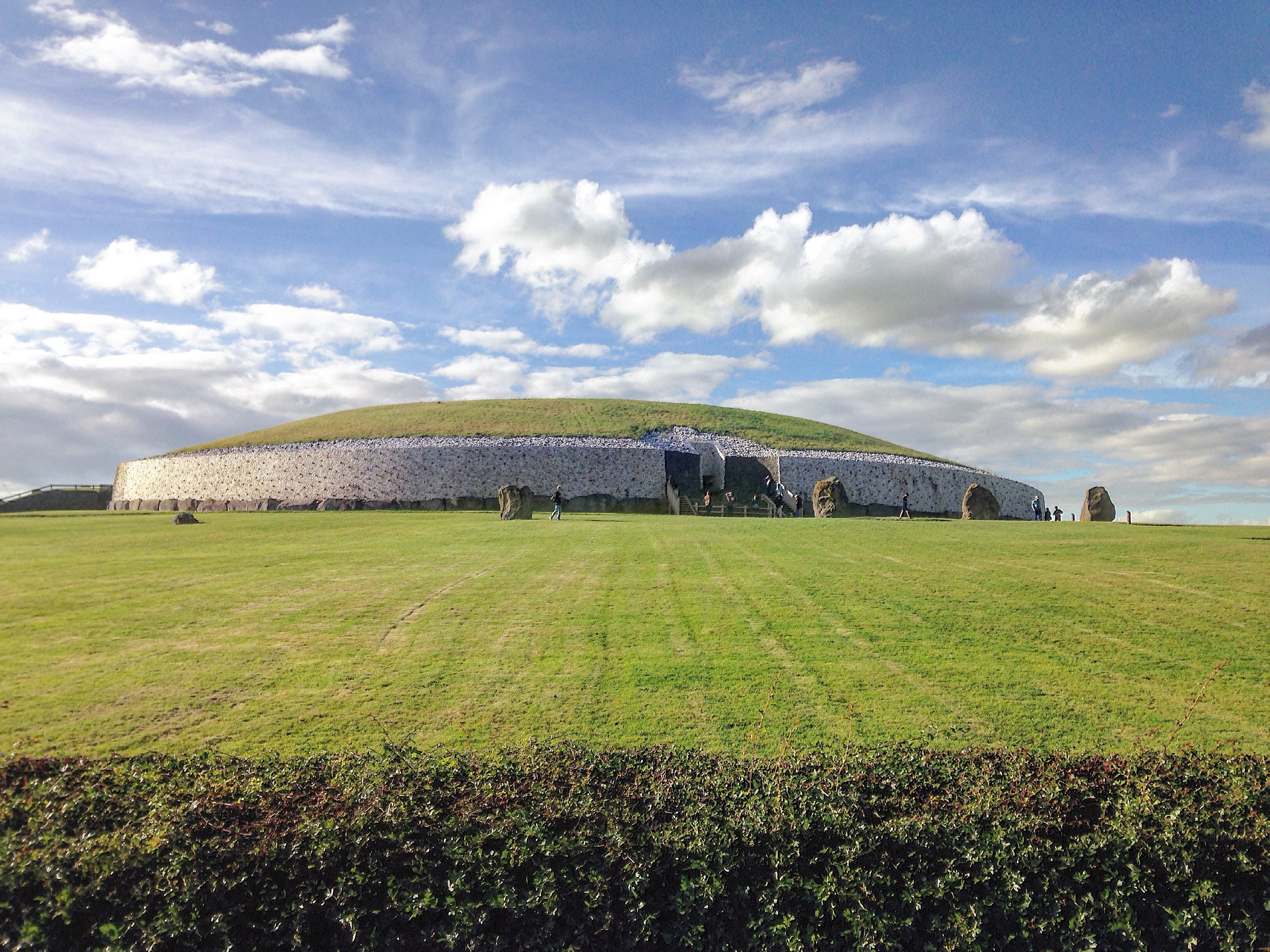
Newgrange, Ireland's largest Neolithic passage tomb, c. 3200 BC. One of the Boyne valley tombs.

The prehistory of Ireland has been pieced together from archaeological evidence, which has grown at an increasing rate over recent decades. It begins with the first evidence of permanent human residence in Ireland around 10,500 BC (although there is some evidence of human presence as early as 31,000 BC) and finishes with the start of the historical record around 400 AD. Both the beginning and end dates of the period are later than for much of Europe and all of the Near East. The prehistoric period covers the Palaeolithic, Mesolithic, Neolithic, Bronze Age and Iron Age societies of Ireland. For much of Europe, the historical record begins when the Romans invaded; as Ireland was not invaded by the Romans its historical record starts later, with the coming of Christianity.

The two periods that have left the most spectacular groups of remains are the Neolithic, with its megalithic tombs, and the Bronze Age, which left among other things, gold jewellery from a time when Ireland was a major centre of gold mining.

Ireland has many areas of bogland, and a great number of archaeological finds have been recovered from these. The anaerobic conditions sometimes preserve organic materials exceptionally well, as with a number of bog bodies, a Mesolithic wicker fish-trap, and a Bronze Age textile with delicate tassels of horse hair.

== Glaciation and the Palaeolithic ==
Ireland during the Last Glacial Period

During the Last Glacial Maximum, (between about 26,000 and 20,000 years BP) ice sheets more than 3,000 m (9,800 ft) thick scoured the landscape of Ireland. By 24,000 years ago they extended beyond the southern coast of Ireland, but by 16,000 years ago the glaciers had retreated so that only an ice bridge remained between Ireland and Scotland. By 14,000 years ago Ireland was completely isolated from Britain; this glacial period is recognized as having ended about 11,700 years ago, without glaciers being present, but leaving Ireland as an arctic tundra landscape. This period is referred to as the Midlandian glaciation.

During the period between 17,500 and 12,000 years ago, a warmer period referred to as the Bølling-Allerød allowed for the rehabitation of northern areas of Europe by roaming hunter-gatherers. Genetic evidence suggests this reoccupation began in southwestern Europe, and faunal remains suggest the existence of a refugium in Iberia that extended into southern France. Species originally attracted to the north during the pre-boreal period included reindeer and aurochs. Some sites as far north as Sweden inhabited earlier than 10,000 years ago suggest that humans might have used glacial termini as places from which to hunt migratory game.

These factors and ecological changes brought humans to the edge of the northernmost ice-free zones of continental Europe by the onset of the Holocene (11.5ky ago) and this included regions close to Ireland. However, during the early part of the Holocene, Ireland itself had a climate that was inhospitable to most European animals and plants. Human occupation was unlikely, although fishing was possible.

Ireland was not joined to Great Britain by a land bridge, meaning that snakes and other temperate terrestrial flora or fauna could not have crossed into Ireland. This was unlike Great Britain, which was connected to continental Europe by a continuous land bridge, called Doggerland, until 7050 BC (fragmenting into islands and finally submerging by 6200 BC).

The earliest known modern humans in Ireland date back to the late Palaeolithic Age (Old Stone Age). This date was pushed back some 2,500 years by radiocarbon dating performed in 2016 on a bear bone excavated in 1903 in the "Alice and Gwendoline Cave", County Clare. The bone has cut marks showing it was butchered when fresh and gave a date of around 10,500 BC, showing humans were in Ireland at that time, soon after the ice retreated. In contrast, a flint worked by a human found in 1968 at Mell, Drogheda, is much older, probably well pre-dating 70,000 BC, and this is normally regarded as having been carried to Ireland on an ice sheet, probably from what is now the bottom of the Irish Sea.

In 2021, a reindeer bone fragment discovered in Castlepook Cave near Doneraile, County Cork in 1972, was dated to 33,000 years ago, establishing human activity in Ireland more than 20,000 years earlier than previously thought. In 2026, researchers discovered cave art in southwest Ireland which suggests permanent human habitation as early as 15,000 years ago. The authors theorised that these early inhabitants crossed from Wales via a land bridge without presenting evidence to support the now discredited land bridge theory.

== Mesolithic (8000–4000 BC) ==
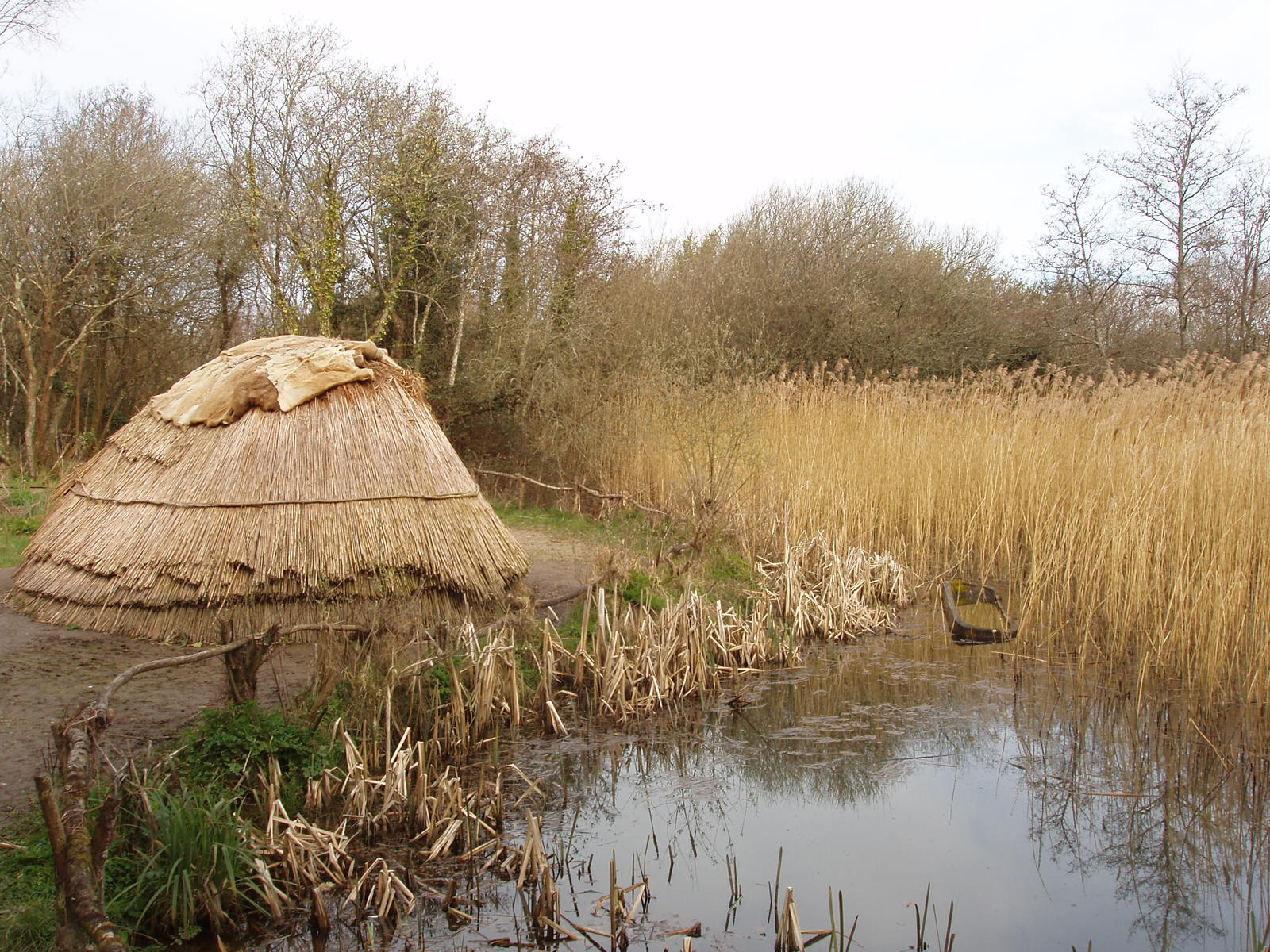
Reconstruction of a hunter-gatherer hut and canoe, Irish National Heritage Park

The last ice age fully came to an end in Ireland about 8000 BC. Until the single 2016 Palaeolithic dating described above, the earliest evidence of human occupation after the retreat of the ice was dated to the Mesolithic (Middle Stone Age), around 7000 BC. By the time the first settlers arrived to Ireland by boat, presumably from Britain, the ice bridge to Great Britain would have melted. The earliest inhabitants of the island were seafarers who depended for much of their livelihood upon the sea, and later inland settlements or camps were usually close to water. Although archaeologists believe Mesolithic people heavily relied on riverine and coastal environments, ancient DNA indicates they had probably ceased contact with Mesolithic societies on the island of Britain and further afield.

Evidence for Mesolithic hunter-gatherers has been found throughout the island: a number of the key early Mesolithic excavations are the settlement site at Mount Sandel in Coleraine, County Londonderry; the cremations at Hermitage House, County Limerick on the bank of the River Shannon; and the campsite at Lough Boora in County Offaly. As well as these, early Mesolithic lithic scatters have been noted around the island, from the north in County Donegal to the south in County Cork. The population has been tentatively estimated at around 8,000.

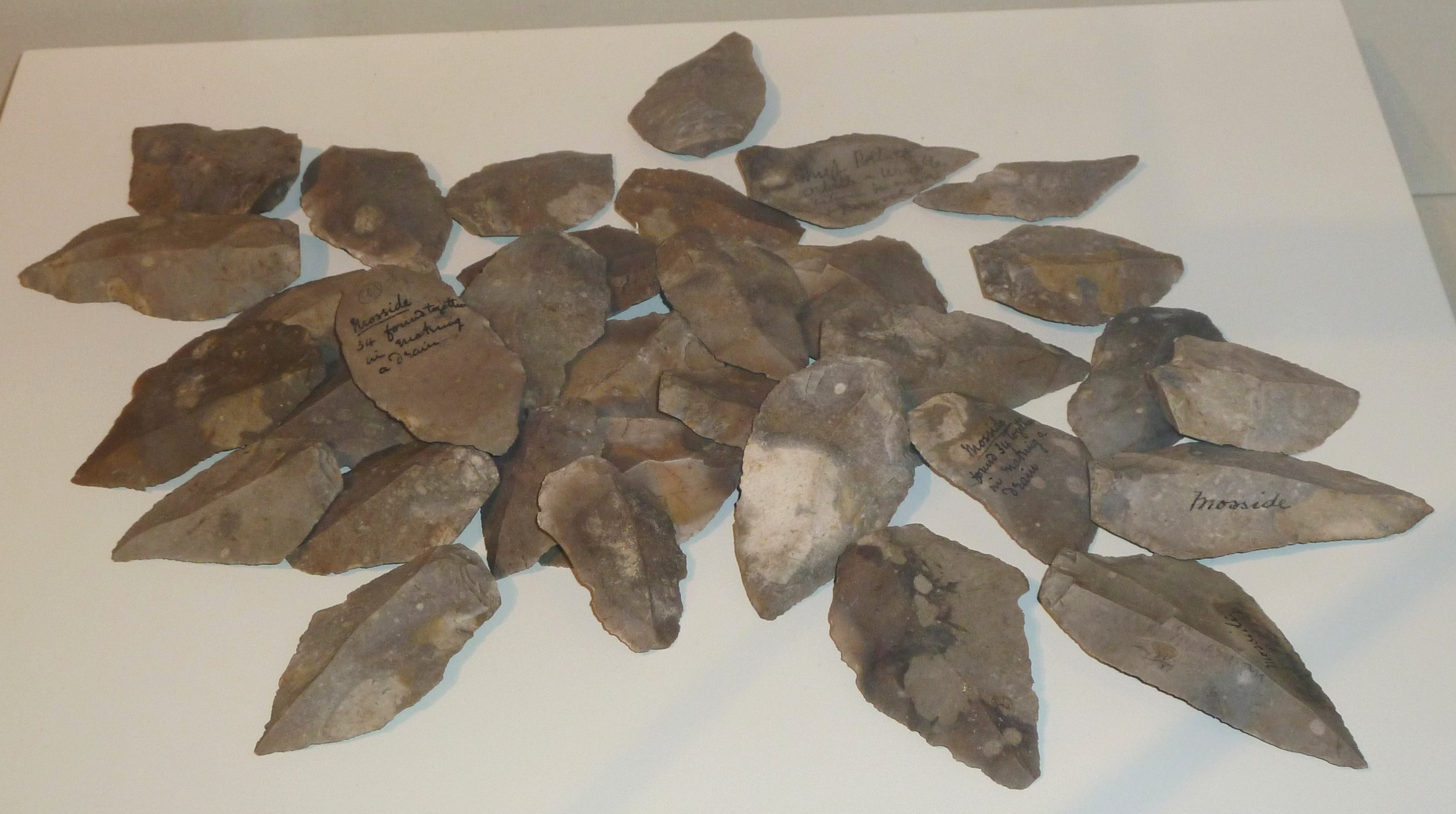
The Moss-side hoard of Mesolithic Bann flake tools and blades, Ulster Museum

The hunter-gatherers of the Mesolithic era lived on a varied diet of seafood, birds, wild boar and hazelnuts. There is no evidence for deer in the Irish Mesolithic and it is likely that the first red deer were introduced in the early stages of the Neolithic. The human population hunted with spears, arrows and harpoons tipped with small stone blades called microliths, while supplementing their diet with gathered nuts, fruit and berries. They lived in seasonal shelters, which they constructed by stretching animal skins or thatch over wooden frames. They had outdoor hearths for cooking their food. During the Mesolithic the population of Ireland was probably never more than a few thousand. Surviving artefacts include small microlith blades and points, and later larger stone tools and weapons, in particular the versatile Bann flake.

== Neolithic (4000–2500 BC) ==
Many areas of Europe entered the Neolithic (New Stone Age) with a 'package' of cereal cultivars, pastoral animals (domesticated oxen/cattle, sheep, goats), pottery, weaving, housing and burial cultures, which arrived simultaneously, a process that began in central Europe as LBK (Linear Pottery culture) about 6000 BC. Within several hundred years this culture was present in northern France. An alternative Neolithic culture, La Hoguette culture, that arrived in France's northwestern region appears to be a derivative of the Ibero Italian-Eastern Adriatic Impressed Cardial Ware culture (Cardium pottery). The La Hoguette culture, like the western Cardial culture, raised sheep and goats more intensely. By 5100 BC there is evidence of dairy practices in southern England, and modern English cattle appear to be derived from "T1 Taurids" that were domesticated in the Aegean region shortly after the onset of the Holocene. These animals were probably derived from cattle from the Linear Pottery culture. Around 4300 BC cattle arrived in northern Ireland during the late Mesolithic period. The red deer was introduced from Britain about this time.

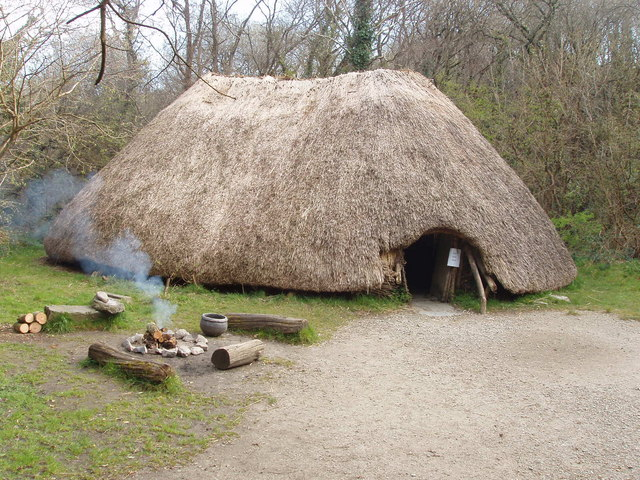
Reconstruction of an early Irish farmer's hut, Irish National Heritage Park

From around 4500 BC a Neolithic package that included cereal cultivars, housing culture (similar to those of the same period in Scotland) and stone monuments arrived in Ireland. Sheep, goats, cattle and cereals were imported from southwestern continental Europe, after which the population rose significantly. The earliest clear proof of farmers in Ireland or Great Britain is from Ferriter's Cove on the Dingle Peninsula, where a flint knife, cattle bones and a sheep's tooth were found and dated to c. 4350 BC. At the Céide Fields in County Mayo, an extensive Neolithic field system (arguably the oldest known in the world) has been preserved beneath a blanket of peat. Consisting of small fields separated from one another by dry-stone walls, the Céide Fields were farmed for several centuries between 3500 and 3000 BC. Wheat and barley were the principal crops cultivated. Pottery made its appearance around the same time as agriculture. Ware similar to that found in northern Great Britain has been excavated in Ulster (Lyle's Hill pottery) and in County Limerick. Typical of this ware are wide-mouthed, round-bottomed bowls.

This follows a pattern similar to western Europe or gradual onset of Neolithic, such as seen in La Hoguette Culture of France and Iberia's Impressed Cardial Ware Culture. Cereal culture advance markedly slows north of France; certain cereal strains such as wheat were difficult to grow in cold climates—however, barley and rye were suitable replacements. It can be speculated that the DQ2.5 aspect of the AH8.1 haplotype may have been involved in the slowing of cereal culture into Ireland, Scotland and Scandinavia since this haplotype confers susceptibility to a Triticeae protein induced disease as well as Type I diabetes and other autoimmune diseases that may have arisen as an indirect result of Neolithisation.

=== Monuments ===
The most striking characteristic of the Neolithic in Ireland was the sudden appearance and dramatic proliferation of megalithic monuments. The largest of these tombs were clearly places of religious and ceremonial importance to the Neolithic population, and were probably communal graves used over a long period. In most of the tombs that have been excavated, human remains—usually, but not always, cremated—have been found. Grave goods—pottery, arrowheads, beads, pendants, axes, etc.—have also been uncovered. These megalithic tombs, more than 1,200 of which are now known, can be divided for the most part into four broad groups, all of which would originally have been covered with earth, that in many cases has been eroded away to leave the impressive stone frameworks:

Types of Irish megalithic tombs

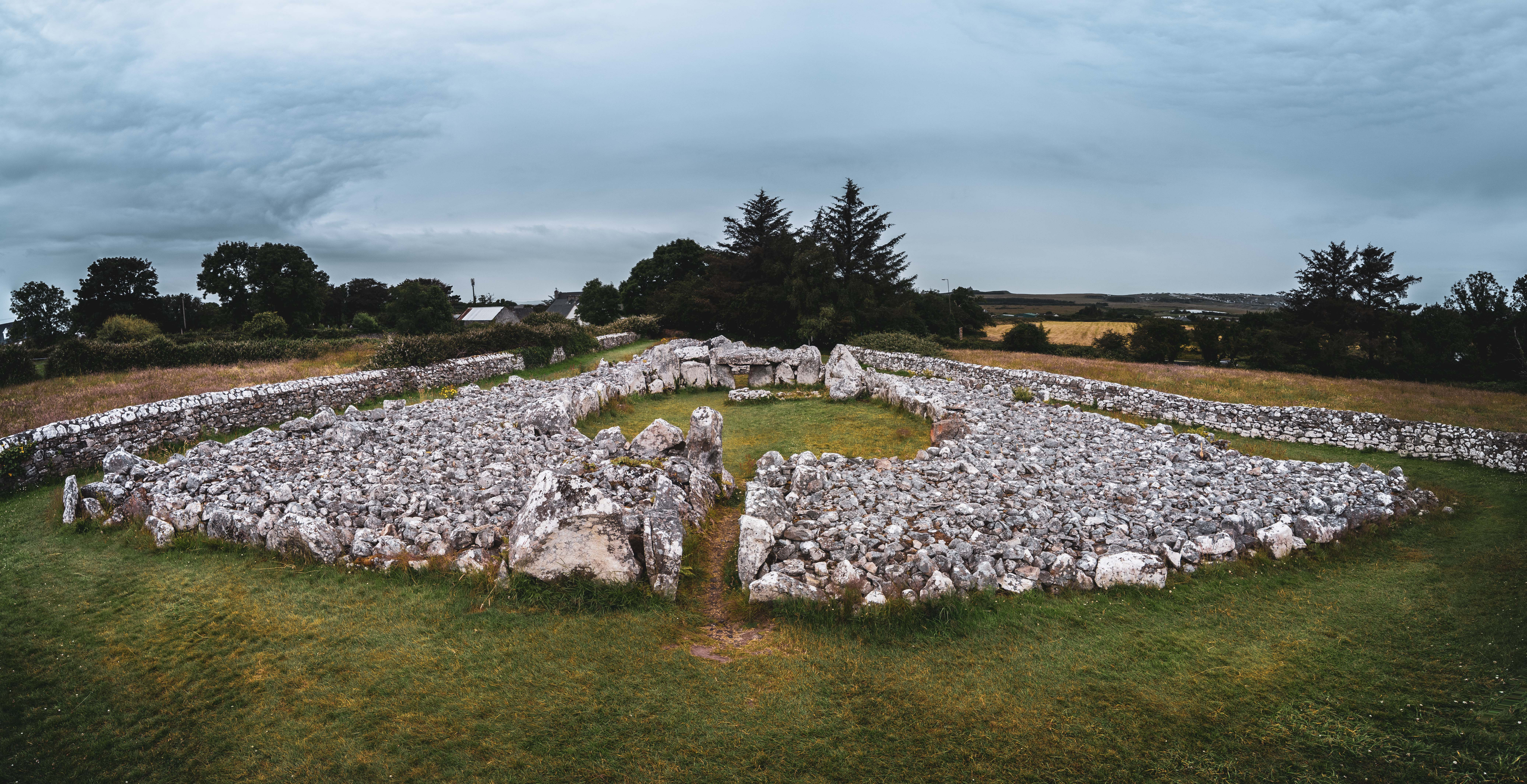
Creevykeel Court Tomb, a court cairn in County Sligo

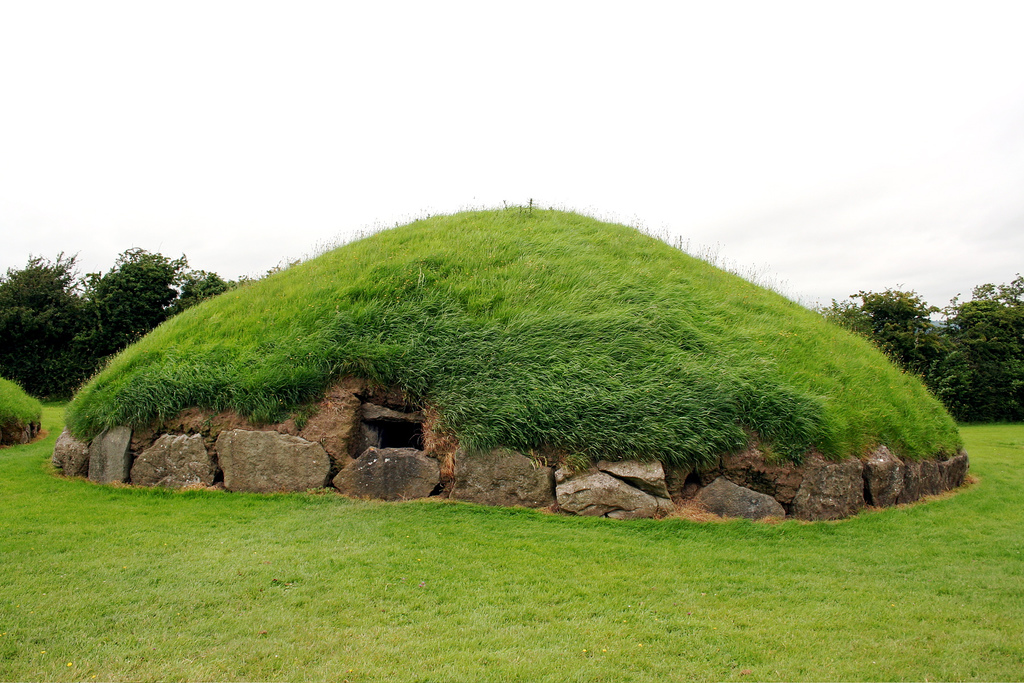
Knowth, a passage tomb at Brú na Bóinne

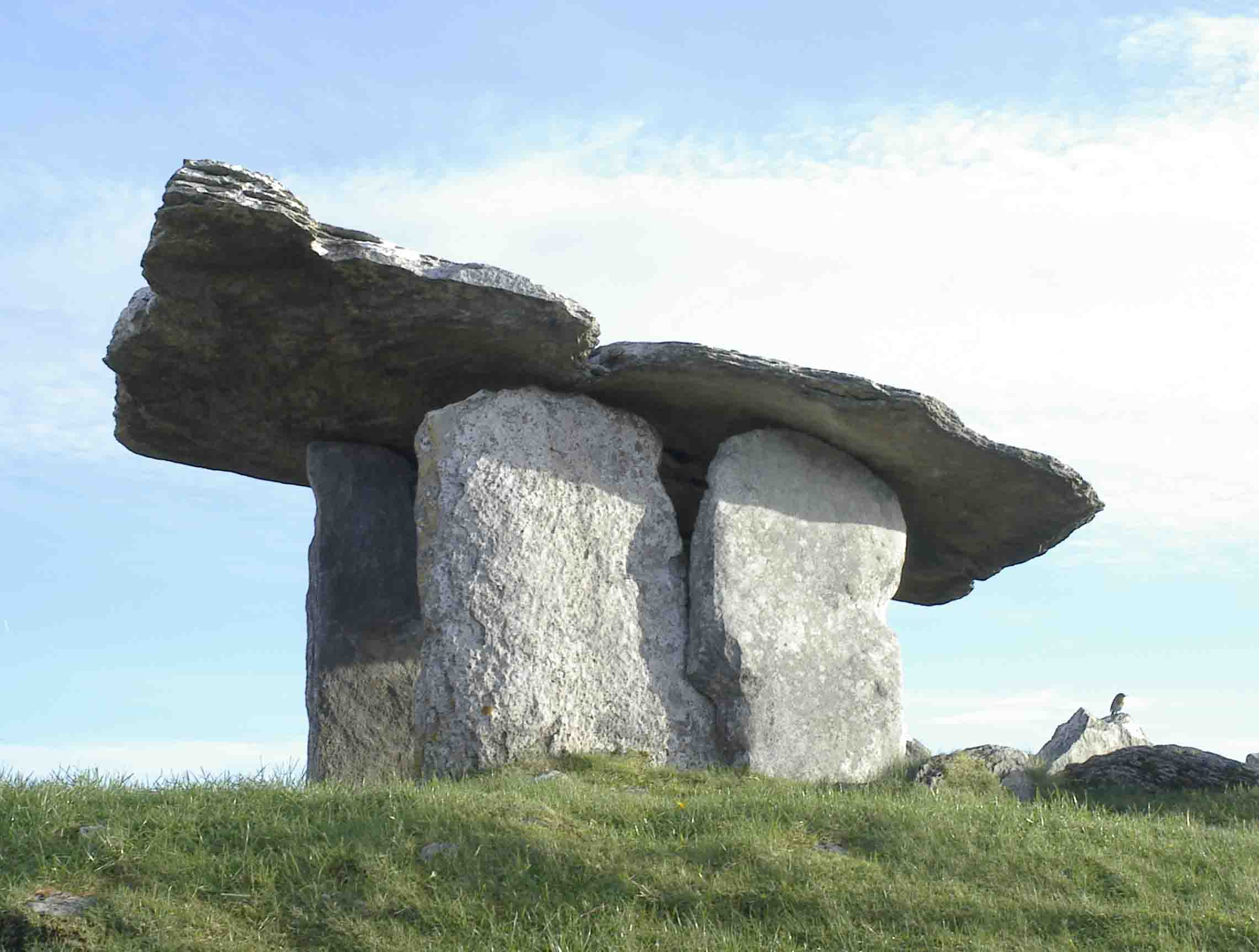
Poulnabrone dolmen, a portal tomb in The Burren

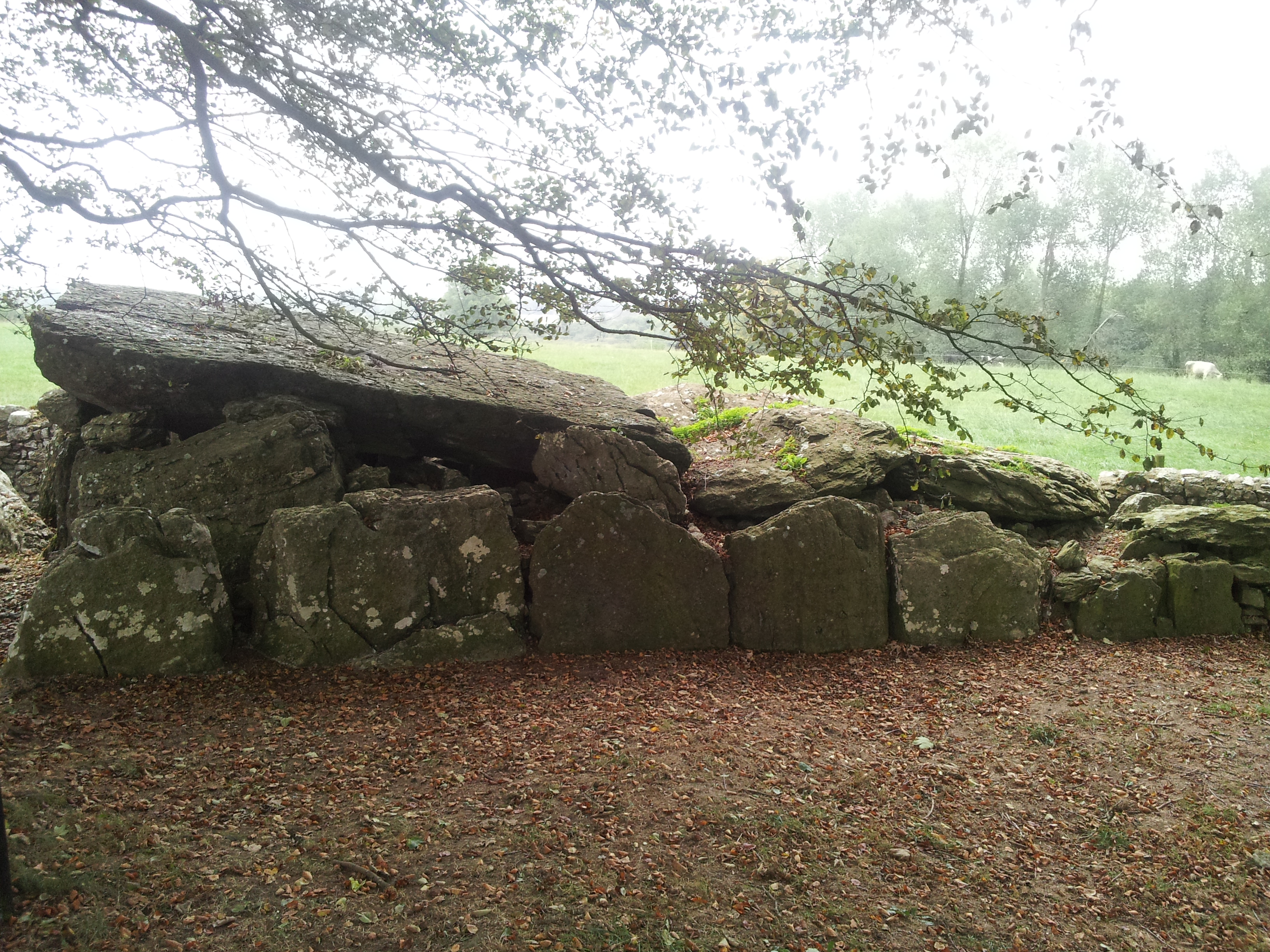
Labbacallee wedge tomb

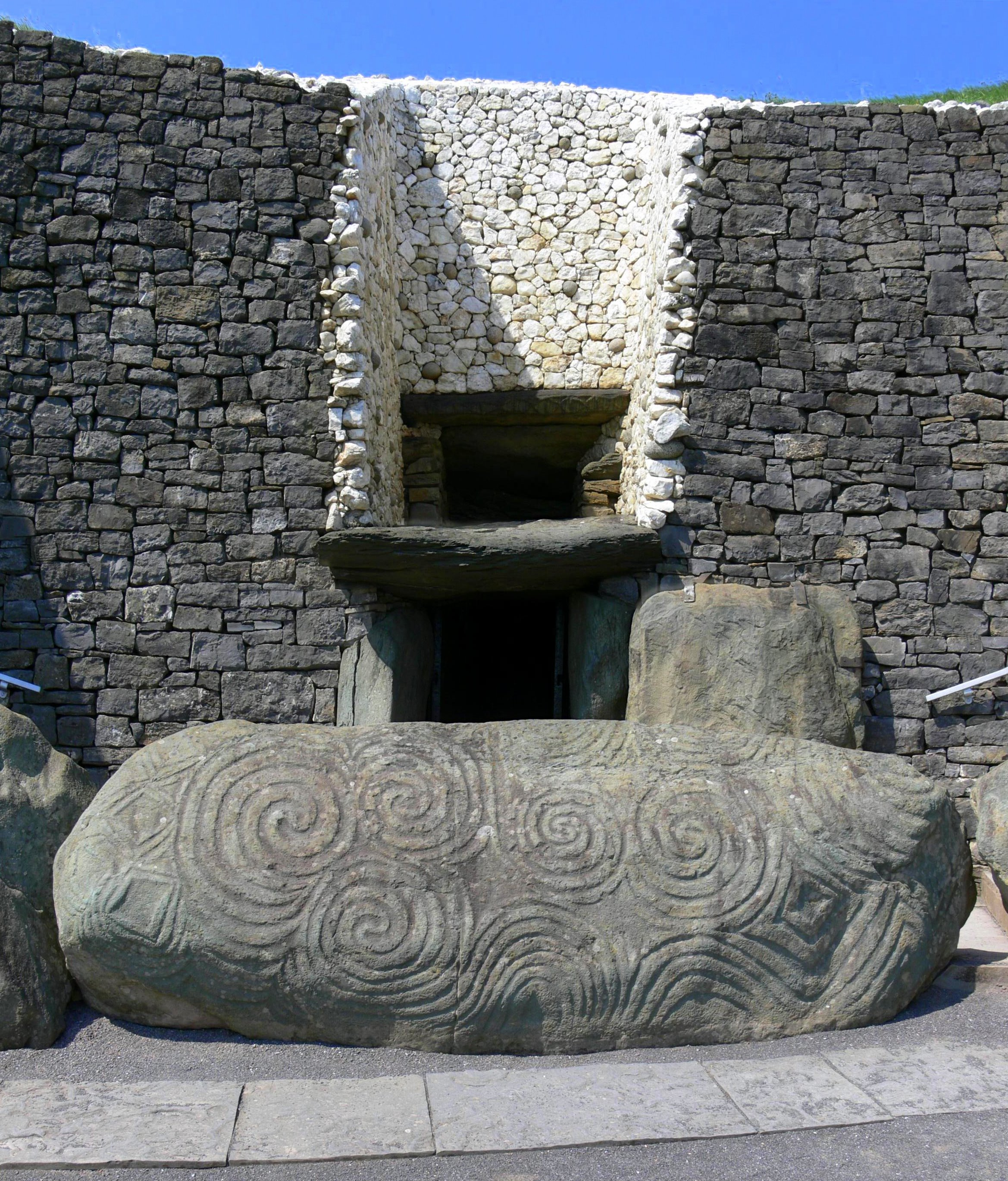
The entrance passage to Newgrange, and the entrance stone

- Court cairns – These are characterised by the presence of an entrance courtyard. They are found almost exclusively in the north of the island and are thought to include the oldest specimens. North Mayo has many examples of this type of megalith – Faulagh, Kilcommon, Erris.
- Passage tombs – These constitute the smallest group in terms of numbers, but they are the most impressive in terms of size and importance. They are also found in much of Europe, and in Ireland are distributed mainly through the north and east, the biggest and most impressive of them being found in the four great Neolithic "cemeteries" of the Boyne (Brú na Bóinne, a World Heritage Site), Loughcrew (both in County Meath), Carrowkeel and Carrowmore (both in County Sligo). The most famous of them is Newgrange, one of the oldest astronomically aligned monuments in the world. It was built around 3200 BC. At the winter solstice the first rays of the rising sun still shine through a light-box above the entrance to the tomb and illuminate the burial chamber at the centre of the monument. Another of the Boyne megaliths, Knowth, has been claimed to contain the world's earliest map of the Moon carved into stone.
- Portal tombs – These tombs include the well known dolmens. They consist of three or more upright stones supporting a large flat horizontal capstone (table). They were originally covered with earth to form a tumulus, but often their covering has now eroded to leave the impressive main stone structure. Most of them are to be found in two main concentrations, one in the southeast of the island and one in the north. The Knockeen and Gaulstown Dolmens in County Waterford are exceptional examples.
- Wedge tombs – The largest and most widespread of the four groups, the wedge tombs are particularly common in the west and southwest. County Clare is exceptionally rich in them. They are the latest of the four types and belong to the end of the Neolithic. They are so called from their wedge-shaped burial chambers.

The theory that these four groups of monuments were associated with four separate waves of invading colonists still has its adherents today, but the growth in population that made them possible need not have been the result of colonisation: it may simply have been the natural consequence of the introduction of agriculture.

=== Portable artefacts ===
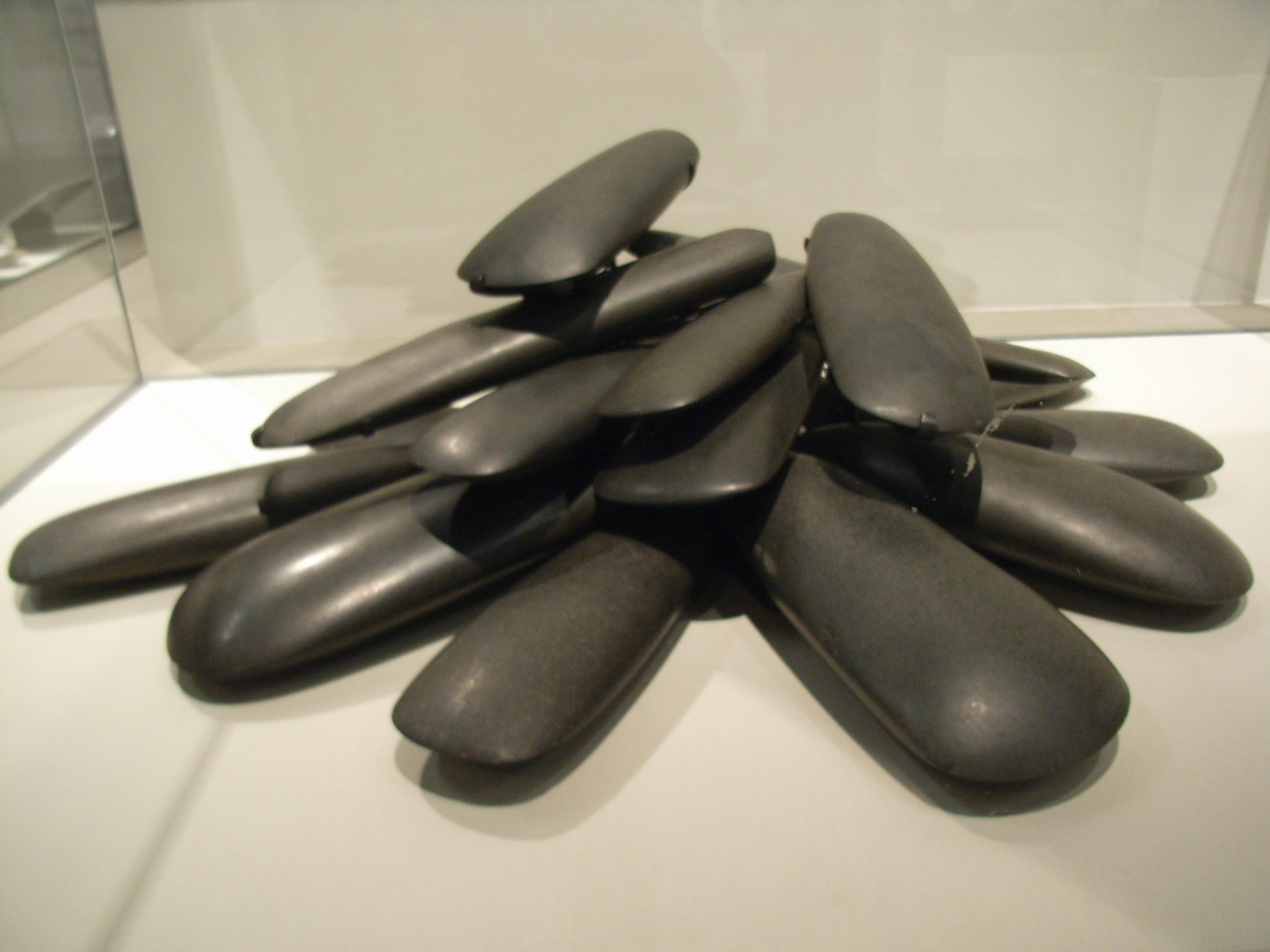
The Malone Hoard of 19 luxury polished Antrim porcellanite axe-heads, dated 4,500-2,500 BC, found in Belfast, Ulster Museum

The stone axe was the primary and essential tool for farming, carefully made in a variety of styles, and often polished. The products of axe factories next to sources of porcellanite, an especially good stone, were traded across Ireland; the main ones were Tievebulliagh and Rathlin Island, both in County Antrim. There were also imports from Britain, including products of the Langdale axe industry of the English Lake District.

There was a much rarer class of imported prestige axe head made from jadeite from north Italy; these may have been slowly traded across Europe to reach Ireland over a period reaching into centuries, and show no signs of use. Miniature axes, too small to be useful, were made, and a "tiny porcellanite axe" has been found in a passage tomb; another example has a hole for a cord, and may have been worn as jewellery or an amulet. Other stone shapes made were chisels, adzes, maces and spearheads. Only one decorated macehead has been found, in one of the tombs at Knowth, but it is extremely fine. Some finds may also be miniature maceheads.

Pierced beads and pendants are found, and two necklaces of shells (from Phoenix Park in Dublin) are very carefully made, with graded periwinkle shells; these were on the remains of two males. As an example of the exceptional preservation sometimes possible in items found in anaerobic bogs, part of a finely woven bag with circular handles has survived; it used reedy plant material wound round thin strips of wood. Decorated pottery, apparently made for funerary rather than domestic use, appears to imitate basketry patterns.

=== Open-air rock art ===
Open-air rock art is another monument type that dates to the Late Neolithic or Early Bronze Age. These carvings are found on open-air boulders and outcrops and the most common motifs are cup and ring marks and radial grooves. This art is often referred to as Atlantic rock art due its similarity to other carvings across Atlantic Europe. In Ireland, the art appears in clusters with the most significant concentrations in counties Fermanagh and Donegal, Wicklow and Carlow, Louth and Monaghan, Cork, and Kerry. The densest clusters are on the Iveragh and Dingle peninsulas in County Kerry.

== Copper and Bronze Ages (2500–800 BC) ==
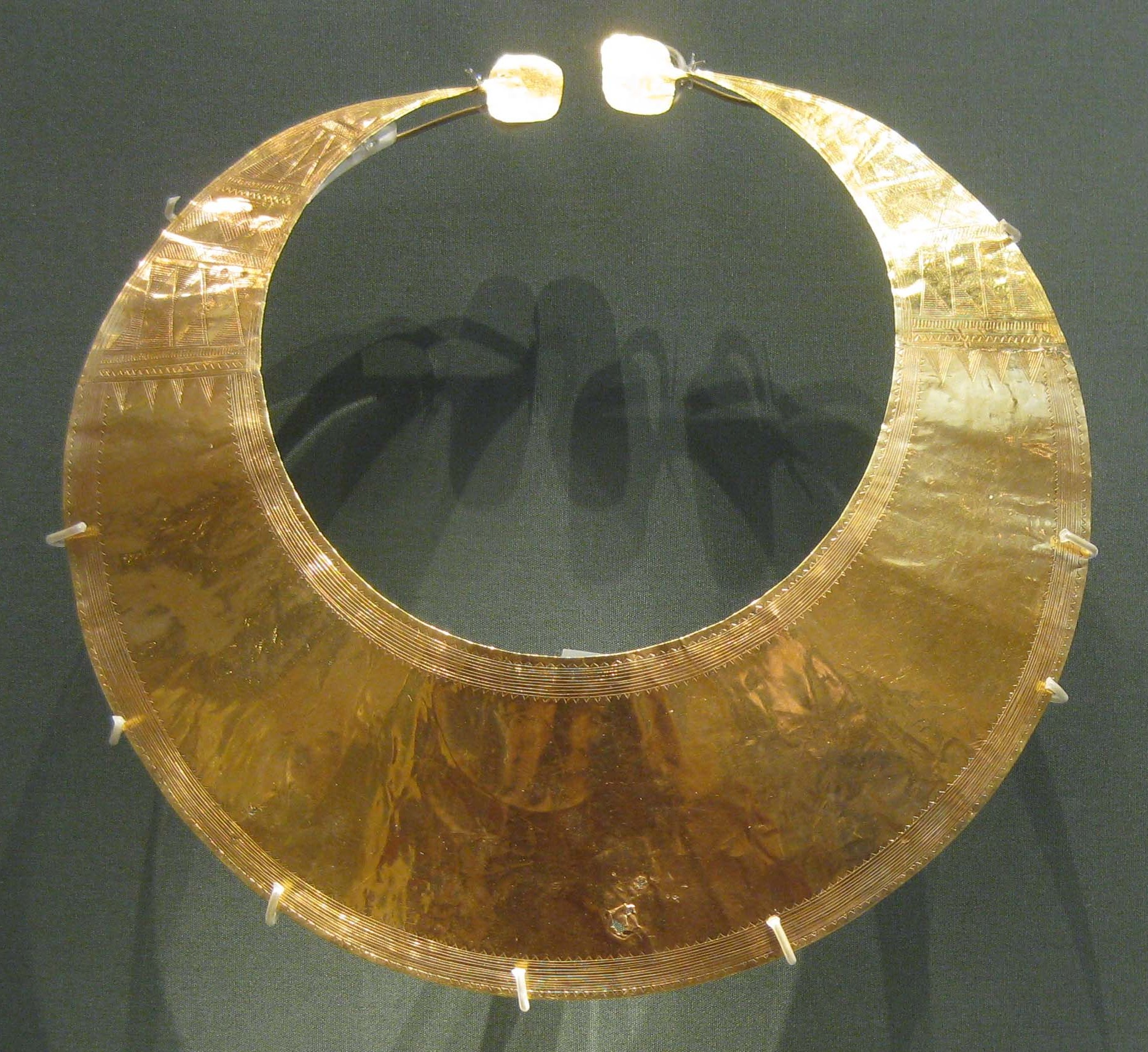
Gold lunula, a type of ornament produced in the Bronze Age British Isles, especially Ireland. This example, probably made 2400-2000 BC, was found in Blessington, eastern Ireland. British Museum.

The Copper and Bronze Age in Ireland lasted for about 1,700 years, from around 2500 BC until around 800 BC.

=== Metalworking ===
Metallurgy arrived in Ireland with the Bell Beaker culture, named from its characteristic pottery, in the shape of an inverted bell. This was quite different from the finely made, round-bottomed pottery of the Neolithic.

The Copper Age in Ireland began around 2400–2500 BC, when the earliest known copper mining in the British-Irish Isles began at Ross Island in County Kerry. Lough Ravel copper axes and most Ballybeg axes were made during this period.

The Bronze Age began once copper was alloyed with tin to produce true bronze artefacts, from around 2000 BC. The tin needed to be imported, normally from Cornwall. Copper continued to be mined in Ireland, chiefly in the southwest, as in the mine at Derrycarhoon, County Cork. Another of Europe's best-preserved copper mines has been discovered at Mount Gabriel in County Cork, which was worked for several centuries in the middle of the second millennium BC. Mines in southwestern Ireland are believed to have produced as much as 370 tonnes of copper during the Bronze Age.

Bronze was used for the manufacture of both weapons and tools. Swords, axes, daggers, hatchets, halberds, awls, drinking utensils and horn-shaped trumpets are just some of the items that have been unearthed at Bronze Age sites. Irish craftsmen became particularly noted for the horn-shaped trumpet, which was made by the cire perdue, or lost wax, process.

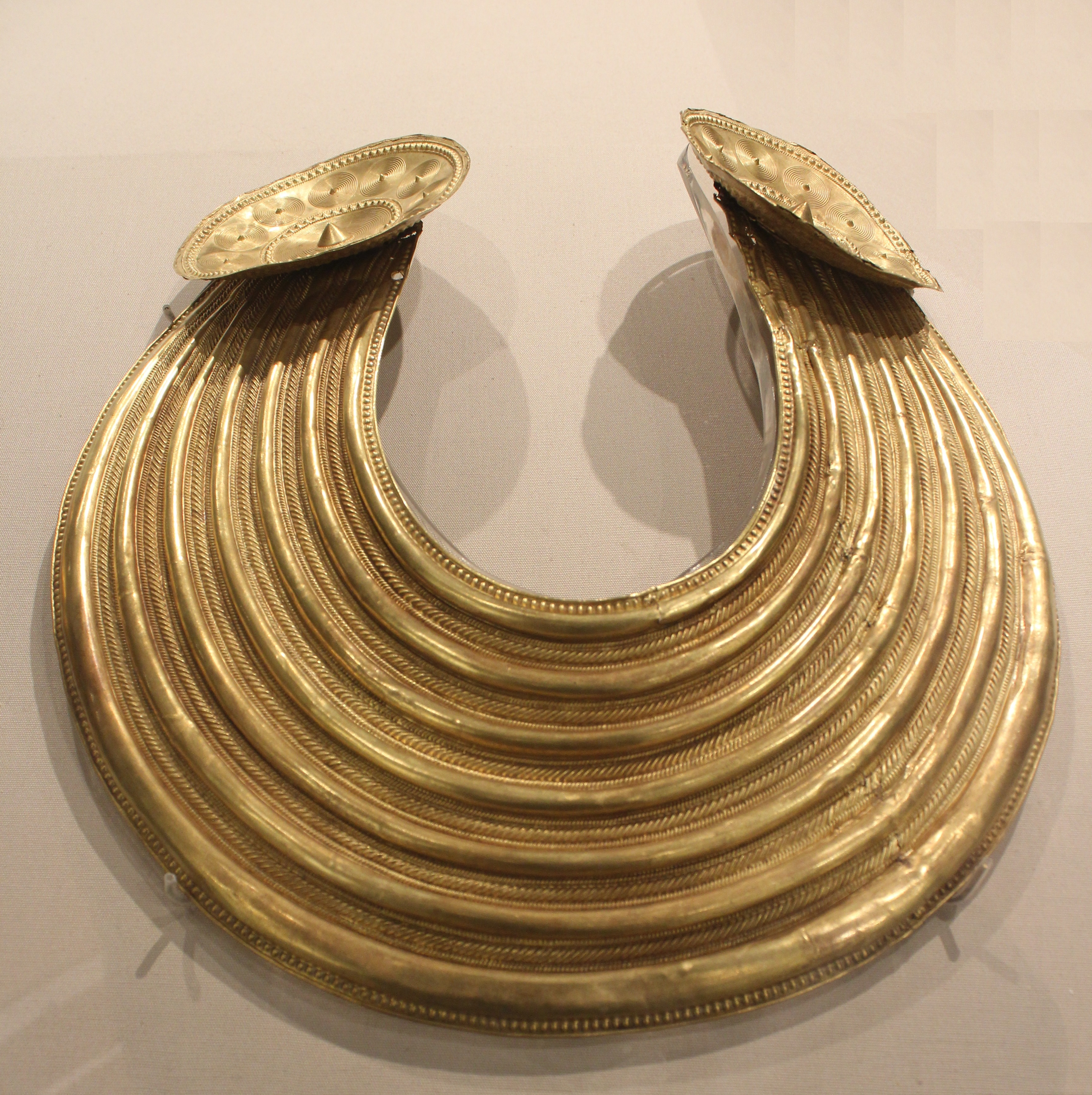
The Gleninsheen gorget, 800-700 BC, National Museum of Ireland, no. 12 in A History of Ireland in 100 Objects

Ireland was also rich in native gold, and the Bronze Age saw the first extensive working of this precious metal by Irish craftsmen. More Bronze Age gold hoards have been discovered in Ireland than anywhere else in Europe. Irish gold ornaments have been found as far afield as Germany and Scandinavia, and gold-related trade was very possibly a major factor in the Bronze Age Irish economy.

In the early stages of the Bronze Age the gold ornaments included simple but finely decorated gold lunulae, a distinctively Irish type of object later made in Britain and continental Europe, and disks of thin gold sheet. Many of these seem to have been long in use before they were deposited. Later the thin twisted torc made its appearance; this was a collar consisting of a bar or ribbon of metal, twisted into a spiral. Other types of gold jewellery made in Ireland during the Bronze Age, most shared with Britain, include earrings, sun disks, bracelets, clothes fasteners, and in the Late Bronze Age, the distinctively Irish large "gorgets", and bullae amulets. After the Bronze Age goldwork almost ceased to be produced in Ireland; the Irish deposits may well have been essentially exhausted.

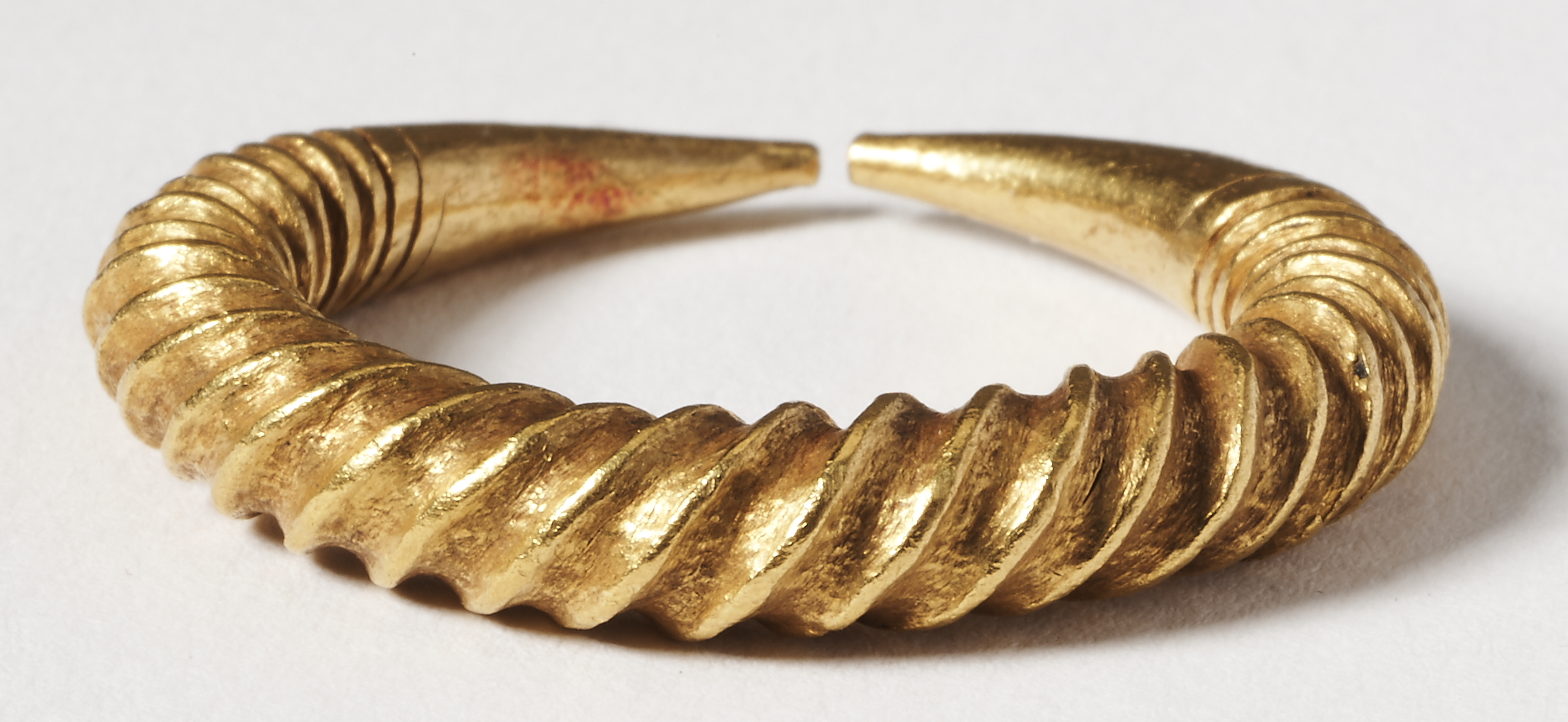
Twisted Gold Pennanular Ring, Late Bronze Age, Hunt Museum, Limerick

The large Dowris Hoard, originally of over 200 items, mostly in bronze, has given its name to the Dowris Phase or period, as a term for the final phase of the Irish Bronze Age, about 900-600 BC. With 48 examples, the hoard contained all but two of the known examples of the distinctive "crotals", bronze rattles in the shape of a bull's testicle, as well as 26 horns or trumpets, weapons, and vessels. The rather earlier Dunaverney flesh-hook (perhaps 1050–900 BC) is suggestive of a culture where elite feasting was important, and reflects influence from continental Europe; very large riveted bronze cauldrons were also made. Large numbers of bronze weapons were produced, and typical sword shapes changed from shorter ones for stabbing and thrusting on foot, to longer ones, perhaps for a mounted warrior to slash with. This is one example of a Dowris Phase design type originating in the Hallstatt culture of continental Europe, probably transmitted via southern Britain; chapes for scabbards is another.

=== People ===
Current evidence suggests it is unlikely there was a large migration of "Bell Beaker folk" into Ireland, like there was in Bronze Age Britain. Archaeologist William O'Brien says it is more likely that there was migration of small groups of traders, metalworkers, prospectors and other specialists. He suggests that Bell Beaker prospectors from mainland Europe discovered the Ross Island copper deposit with help from local Neolithic people. Bell Beaker pottery in Ireland is often found at older Neolithic sites such as the Boyne Valley tombs and Lough Gur. This suggests there was a "selective assimilation" and acculturation of Bell Beaker influences into Neolithic Irish society.

Some scholars suggest that speakers of Celtic languages arrived in Ireland during the Bronze Age and that this was associated with the Bell Beaker culture. This period saw the arrival of people with Steppe/Yamnaya ancestry, which eventually became dominant. Archaeologist J. P. Mallory writes that the arrival of Bell Beaker culture and spread of Bell Beaker genes seems to offer "a simple and clear model" of Irish Gaelic origins, as there is no evidence of later large migrations to Ireland, archaeologically or genetically. An archaeogenetics study found that three Bronze Age men buried on Rathlin Island between 2000 and 1500 BC were most genetically similar to the modern Irish, Scots and Welsh.

Mallory, however, proposes there was a language shift sometime after 1400 BC: that Goidelic was at first spoken by a minority (perhaps a certain class), and Ireland's pre-Goidelic people gradually switched to it because it was more advantageous (easier access to goods, status, power, security etc). He suggests two "archaeological horizons" where a language shift could have happened. The first is 1400–900 BC, in the late Bronze Age, when many hillforts were built. Mallory suggests that a "hillfort language" would be a likely candidate for proto-Goidelic. These hillforts were hubs that probably had a range of functions, which could have fostered bilingualism and language shift. Others argue that the "Celts" arrived at the beginning of the Iron Age.

The population of Ireland at the end of the Bronze Age was probably in excess of 100,000, and may have been as high as 200,000. It is possible that it was not much greater than it had been at the height of the Neolithic.

Crannogs are timber homes built in shallow lakes for security, often with a narrow walkway to the shore. Some use or extend natural islets, and the largest probably housed a number of families, and animals. It is thought that most of the 1,200-odd crannogs in Ireland were begun in the Bronze Age, although many sites seem to have been used, continuously or intermittently, over very long periods, even into medieval times.

Construction of wedge tombs tailed off from about 2,200 BC, and while the previous tradition of large scale monument building was much reduced, existing earlier megalithic monuments continued in use in the form of secondary insertions of funerary and ritual artefacts. Towards the end of the Bronze Age the single-grave cist made its appearance. This consisted of a small rectangular stone chest, covered with a stone slab and buried a short distance below the surface. The body might be cremated, or not. Decorated pots often accompanied the remains, and later cremated remains were placed inside the urn, which was turned upside-down, and might also have grave goods of various sorts. Numerous stone circles were also erected at this time, chiefly in Ulster and Munster.

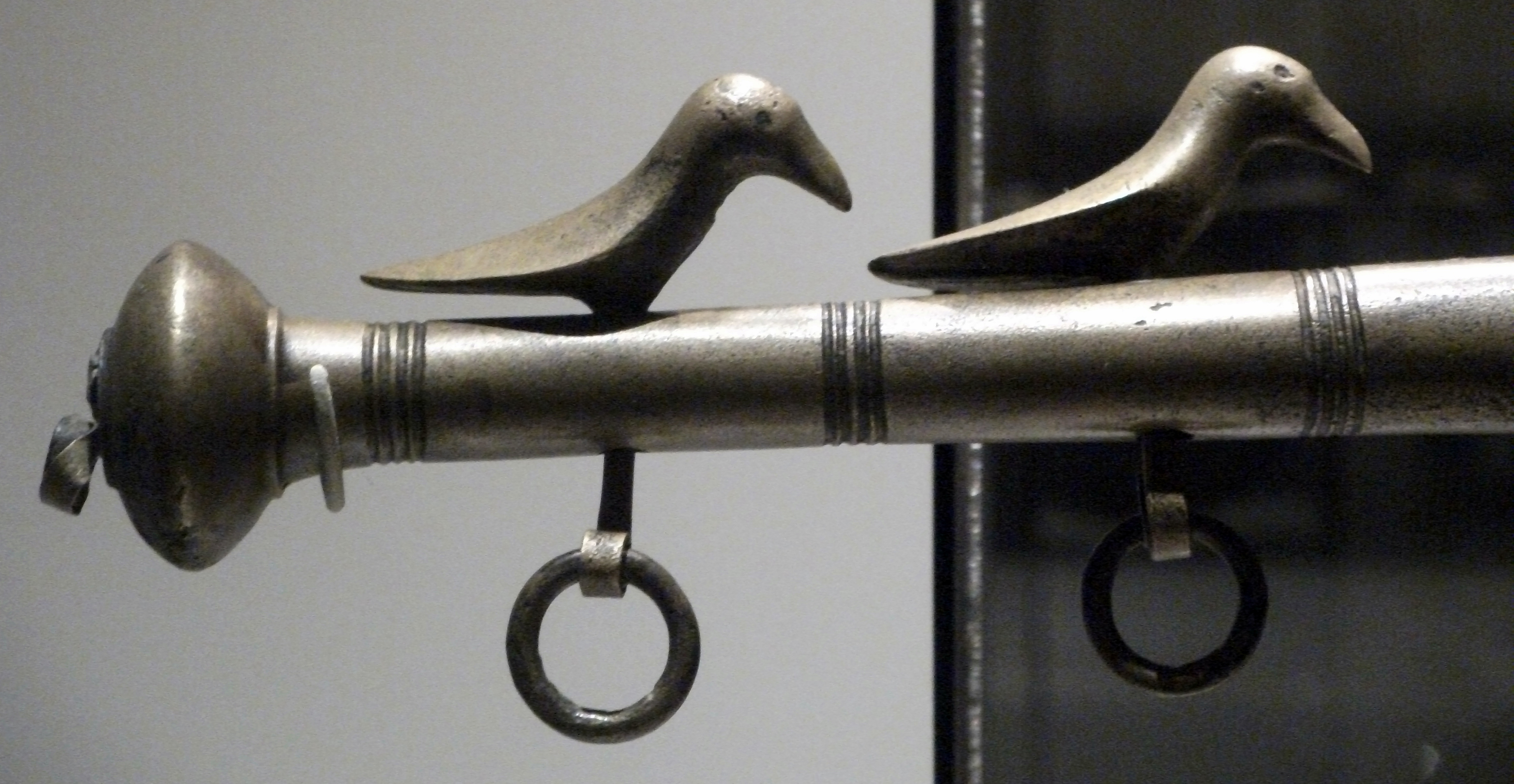
End of the Dunaverney flesh-hook

=== Gallery ===
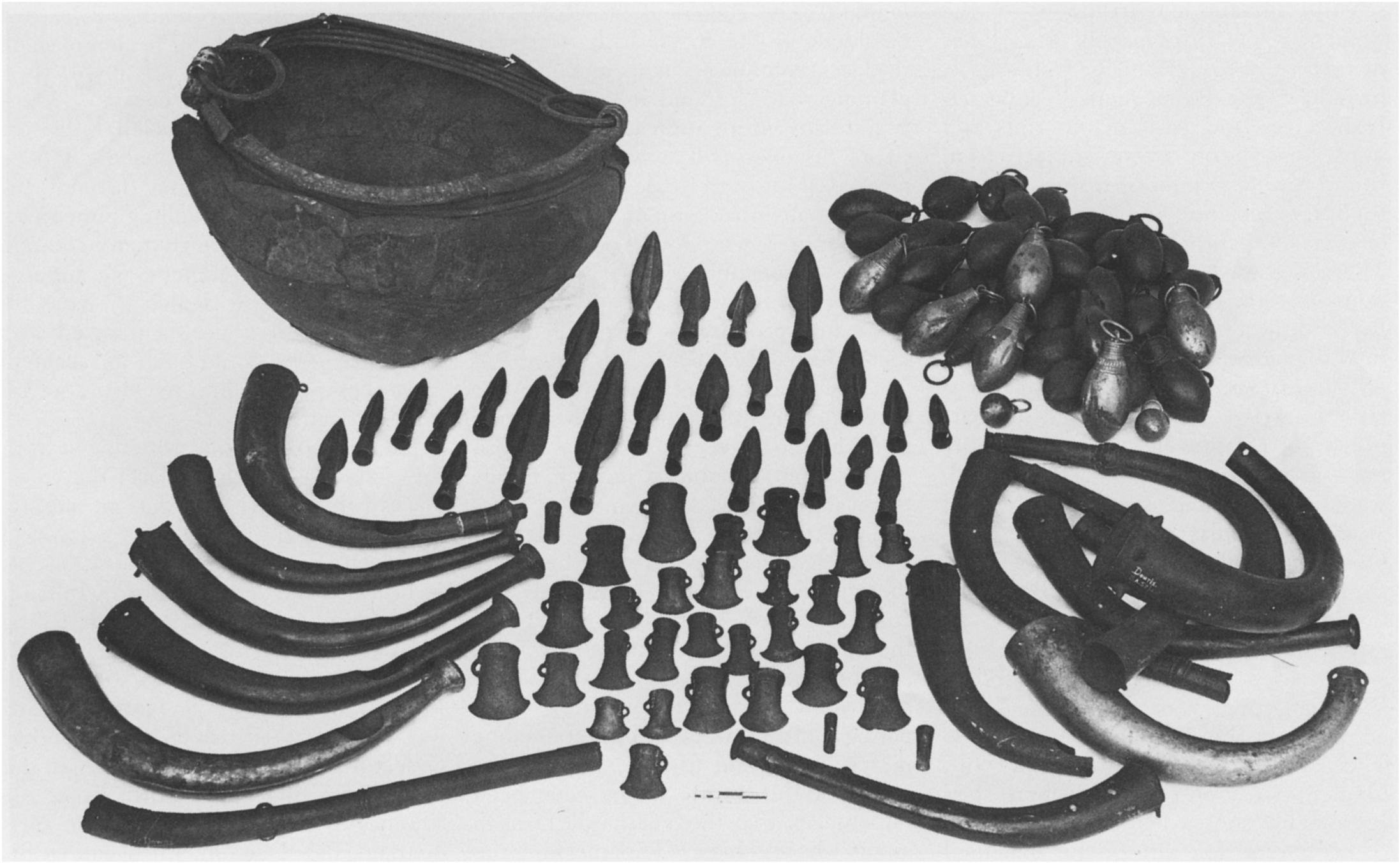
Part of the Dowris Hoard

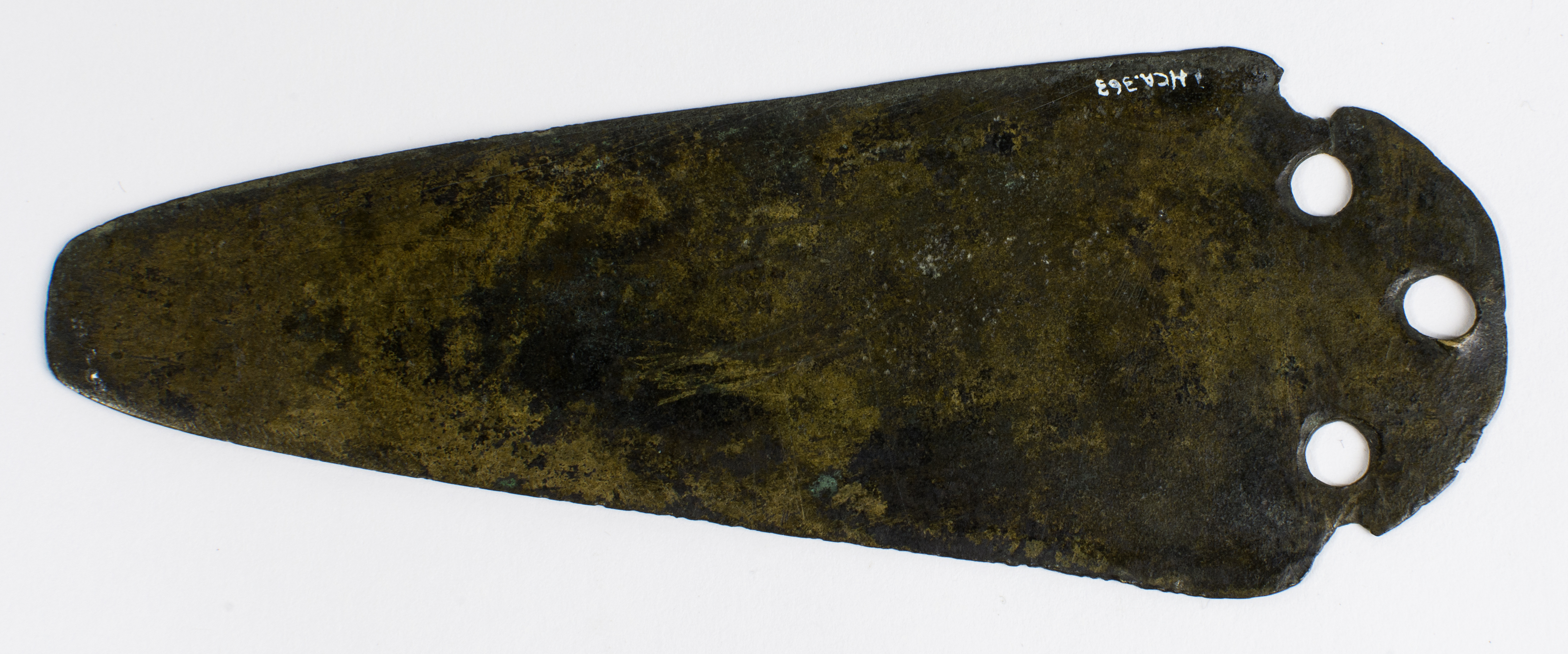
Tongue-shaped bronze dagger, Hunt Museum

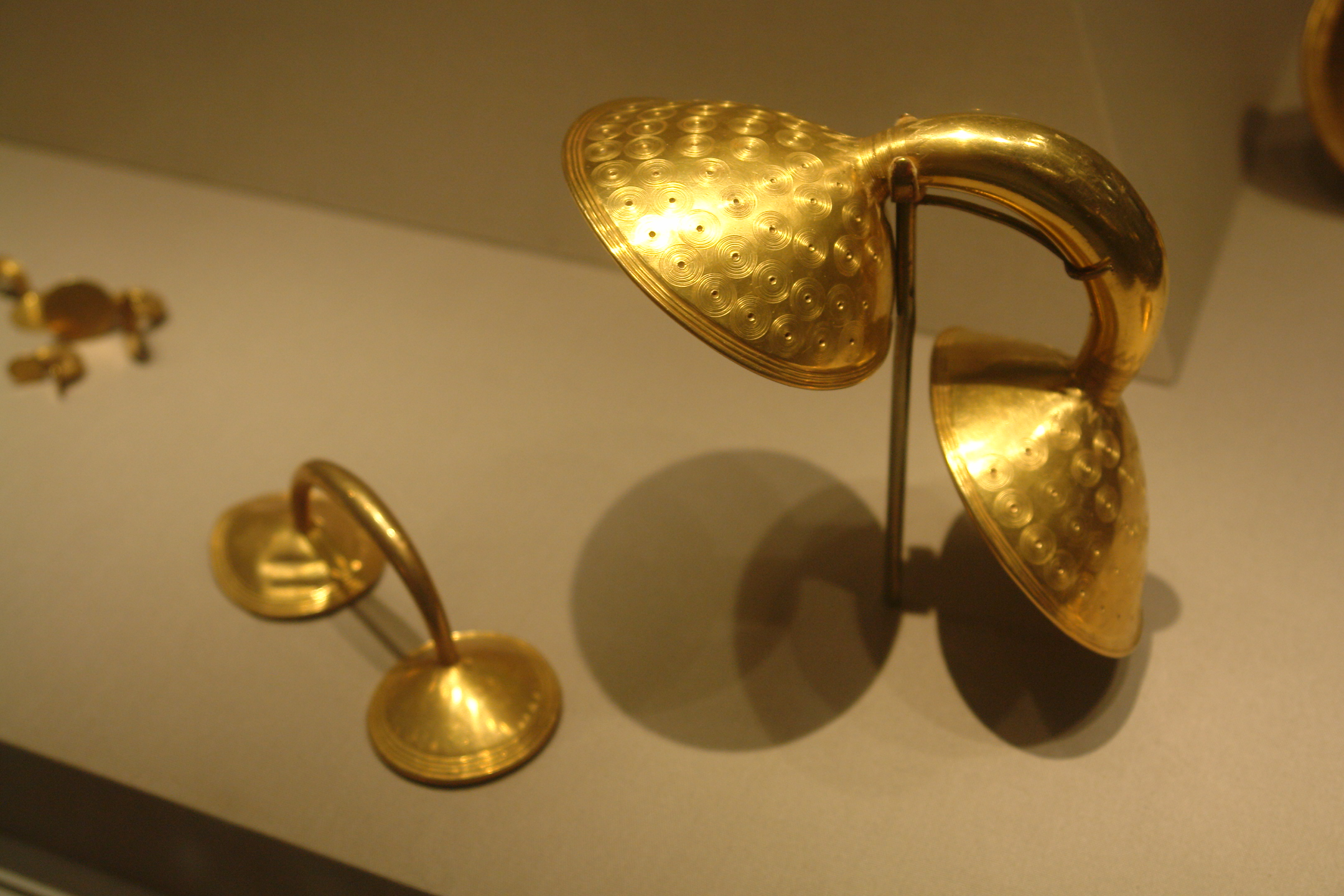
Gold Dress Fastener, Clones, County Monaghan, 800-700 BC

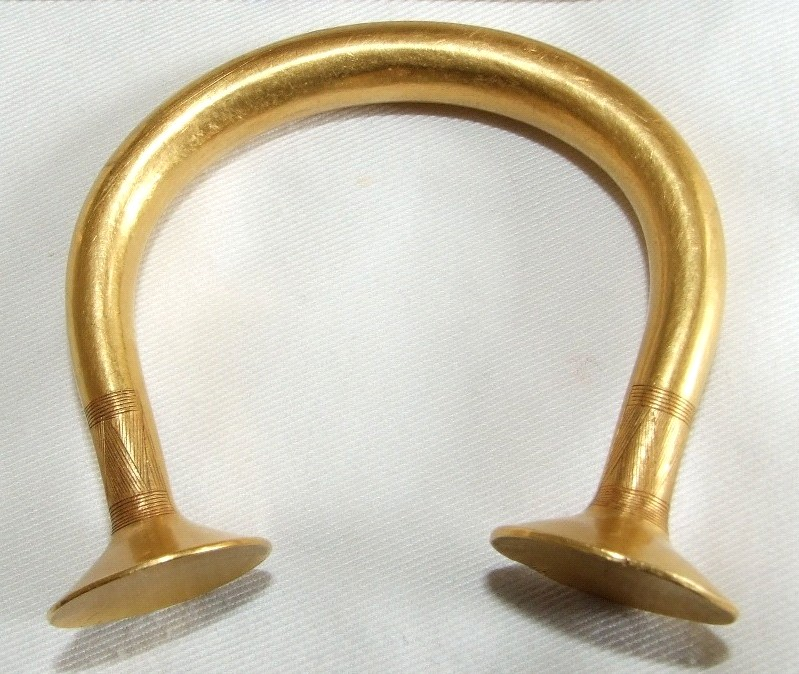
Late Bronze Age bracelet from Castlederg, c. 950-800 BC

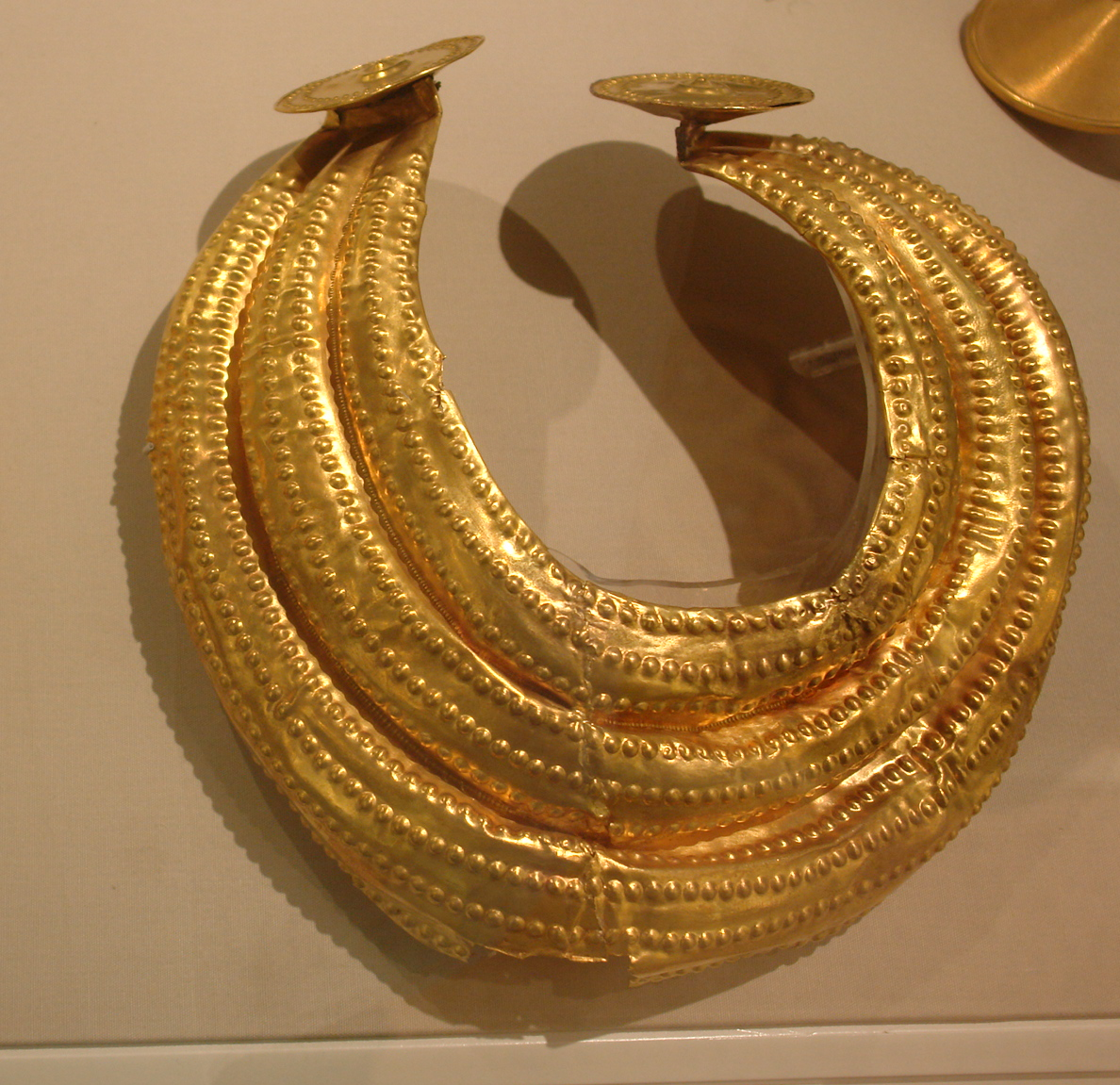
Late Bronze Age gold "gorget", 800-700 BC, found in County Clare. NMI, Dublin

== Iron Age (800 BC–AD 400) ==
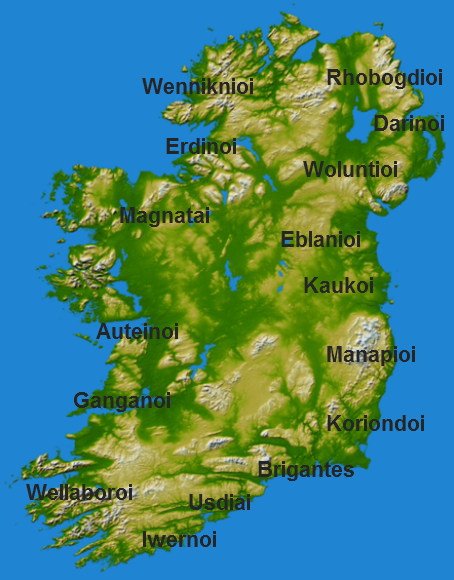
Tribes of Ireland according to Ptolemy's Geographia (written c. 150 AD)

The Irish Iron Age has long been thought to begin around 500 BC and then continue until the early Christian era in Ireland, which brought some written records and therefore the end of prehistoric Ireland. However, although it has proven difficult to identify sites from the earlier part of the period, over the past several decades the dating of individual artefacts and ironworking sites has led scholars to amend chronologies to place the start of the Iron Age in Ireland during the seventh or eighth century BC. One find of great importance to this reassessment is the wooden shaft of a very elegant iron spearhead found in the River Inny near Lackan, which was carbon dated to between 811 and 673 BC. This may further erode the belief, still held by some, that the arrival of iron-working marked the beginning of the arrival of the Celts (i.e. speakers of the Proto-Celtic language) and thus Indo-European speakers, to the island.

Alternatively, many hold the view that this happened with the bearers of the Bell Beaker culture, probably Indo-European speaking, reaching Ireland during the earlier stage of the Bronze Age. The Celtic languages of Britain and Ireland, also known as Insular Celtic, can be divided into two groups, Goidelic and Brittonic. When primary written records of Celtic first appear in about the fifth century, Gaelic or Goidelic, in the form of Primitive Irish, is found in Ireland, while Brittonic, in the form of Common Brittonic, is found in Britain.

The Iron Age includes the period in which the Romans ruled most of the neighbouring island of Great Britain. Roman interest in the area led to some of the earliest written evidence about Ireland. The names of its tribes were recorded by the geographer Ptolemy in the 2nd century AD.

The recorded tribes of Ireland included at least three with names identical or similar to British or Gaulish tribes: the Brigantes (also the name of the largest tribe in northern and midland Britain), the Manapii (possibly the same people as the Menapii, a Belgic tribe of northern Gaul) and the Coriondi (a name similar to that of Corinion, later Cirencester and the Corionototae of northern Britain).

Up to about 150 BC, there are many finds that show stylistic influence from continental Europe (as in the preceding Dowris phase), and some direct imports. After that date, relationships with British styles predominate, perhaps reflecting some movement of people. The Keshcarrigan Bowl, possibly made in Britain, is an example of this. Another cup found in Fore, County Westmeath does seem to be an import.

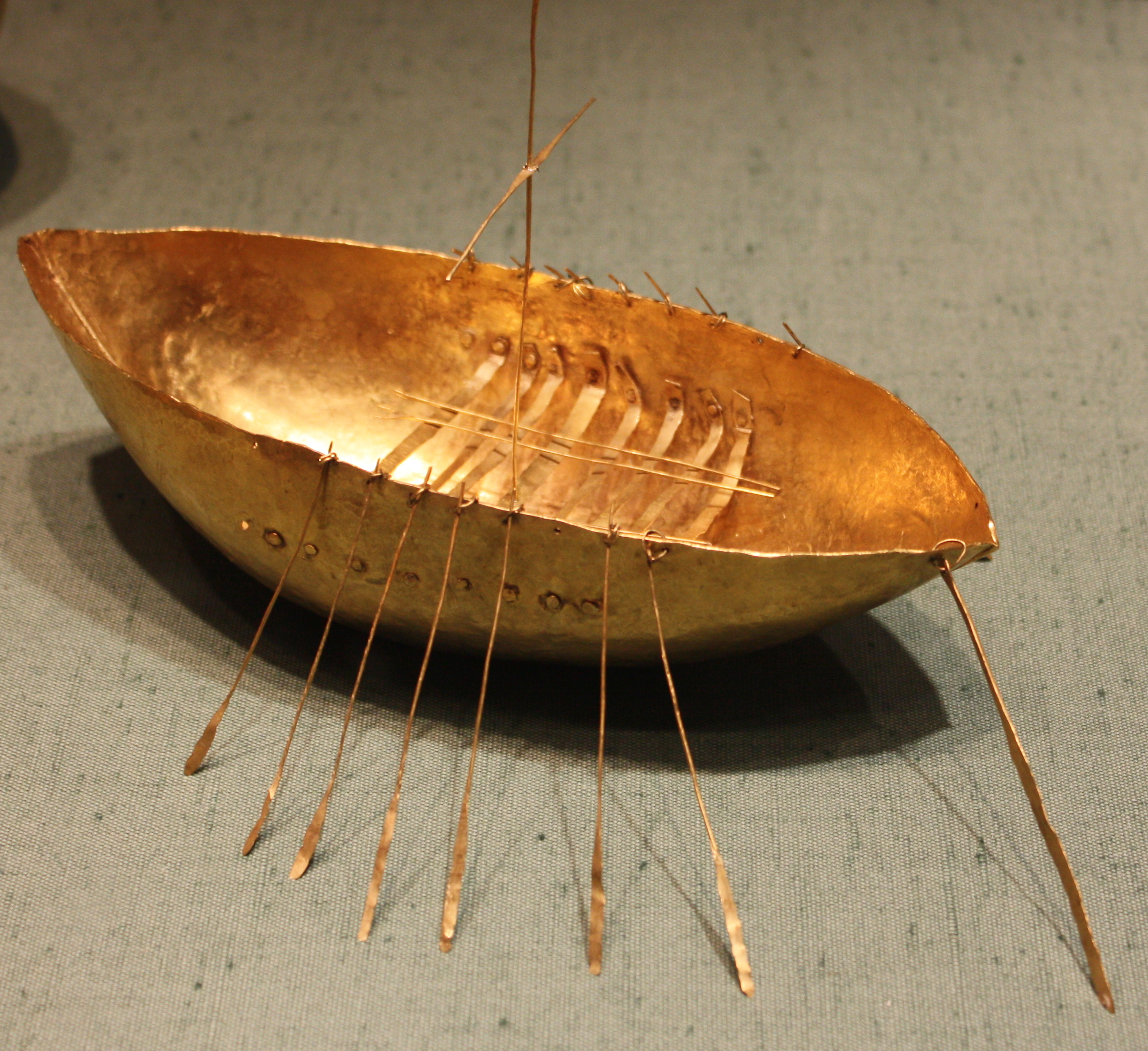
Gold model boat from the Broighter Hoard, c. 100 BC

Examples from Iron Age Ireland of La Tène style, the term for Iron Age Celtic art, are very few, to a "puzzling" extent. In Ireland, La Tène artefacts are mostly confined to the northern two-thirds of the island; concentrated in east Ulster and an east-west band across the midlands. Northern County Antrim has the greatest concentration of La Tène finds; among these are the metalwork from Lisnacrogher, outside Ballymena. Examples of La Tène artefacts in Ireland are the Broighter Gold, the Bann disc, the Petrie Crown, the Turoe Stone and Castlestrange Stone. This was well after Celtic art elsewhere had been subsumed into Gallo-Roman art and its British equivalent. Despite this it was in Ireland that the style seemed to revive in the early Christian period, to form the Insular art of the Book of Kells and other well-known masterpieces, perhaps under influence from Late Roman and post-Roman Romano-British styles. The 1st century BC Broighter Gold hoard, from Ulster, includes a small model boat, a spectacular torc with relief decoration influenced by classical style, and other gold jewellery probably imported from the Roman world, perhaps as far away as Alexandria.

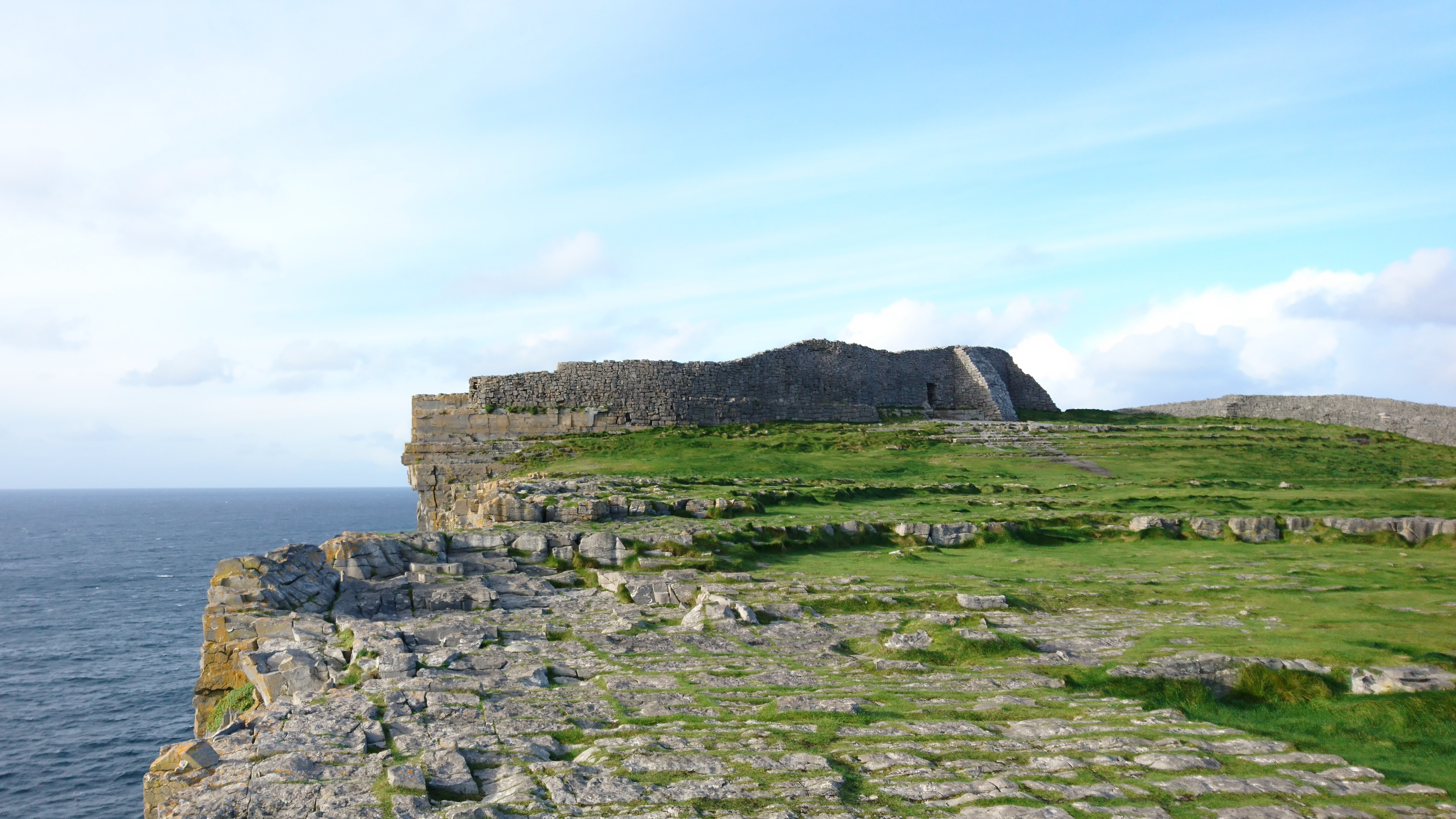
Dún Aonghasa hillfort, walls c. 500 BC

The headland of Drumanagh, near Dublin and not yet fully excavated, may have represented a centre for trade with Roman Britain. Drumanagh is an example of the coastal promontory fort, using cliff headlands with a narrow neck to reduce the extent of fortification necessary. In Ireland these seem to be mainly a feature of the Iron Age, with some perhaps dating to the Bronze Age, and also continuing to be used into the early medieval period. Although today seen as mostly dating from the early historic period, some of the perhaps 60,000 ringforts or raths in Ireland date back to the Late Iron Age. These vary greatly in size and function, with smaller ones a single-family farmstead (with slaves), or merely an enclosure for animals, and larger ones clearly having a wider political and military significance.

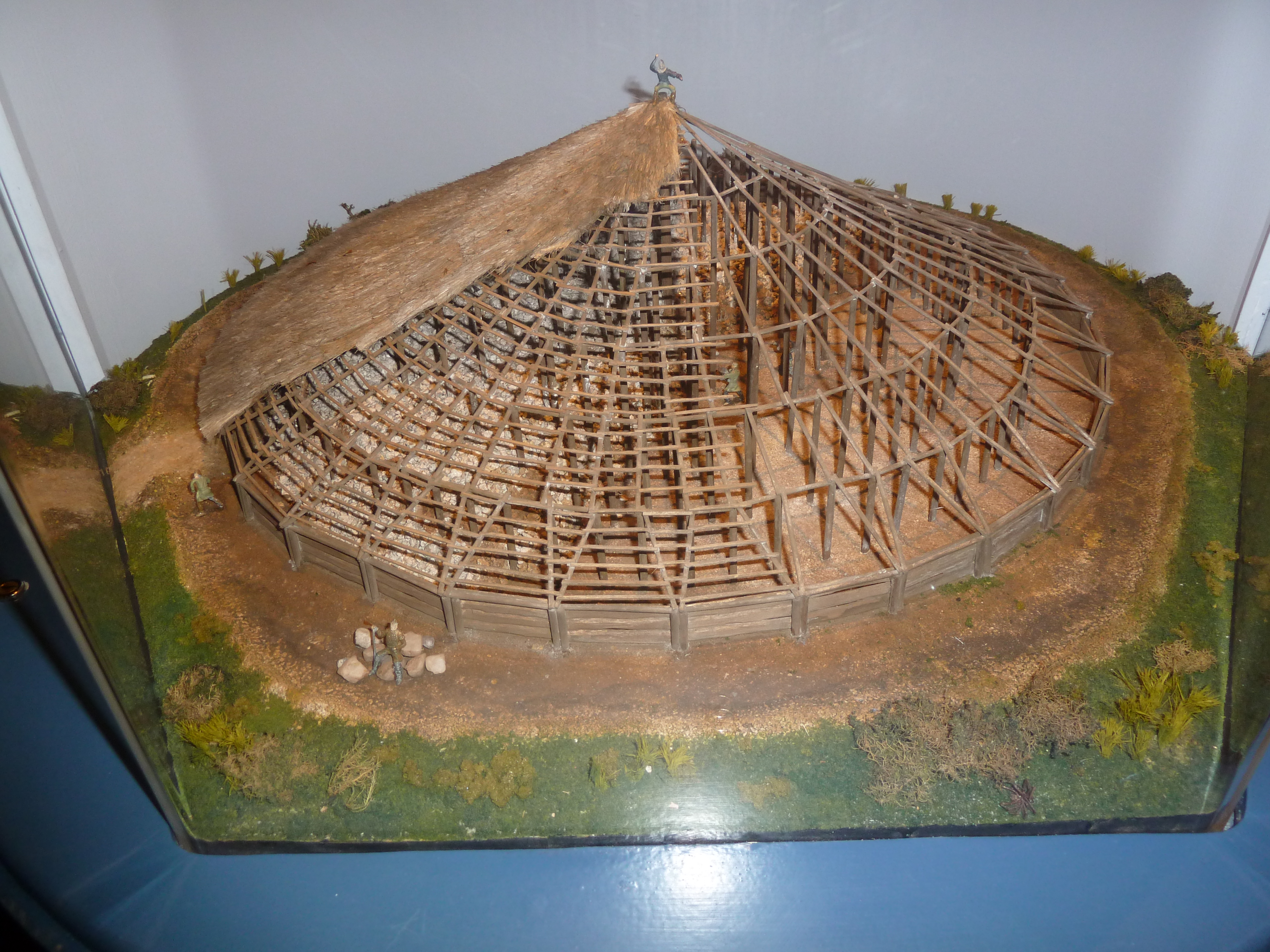
Model reconstruction of the circular building at Navan Fort, c. 100 BC

There are several ringforts in the complex topping the Hill of Tara, which seems to have its origins in the late Iron Age, although the site also includes a Neolithic passage grave and other earlier tombs. This is one of a number of major sites connected in later literature and mythology with kingship, and probably had a ritual and religious significance, though it is now impossible to be clear as to what this was. Navan Fort (Emain Macha), another major hilltop site, had a very large circular building constructed on it about 100 BC. It was forty metres across, with 275 tree-posts in rings. The largest was the central post, a tree felled about 95 BC. Within the century following the whole building was destroyed, apparently in a ritual fashion.

Other large-scale constructions, requiring a good degree of social organization, include linear earthworks such as the Black Pig's Dyke and Cliadh Dubh, probably representing boundaries, and acting as hindrances to cattle-raids, and "toghers" or wooden trackways across boggy areas, of which the best-known is the Corlea Trackway, a corduroy road dated to 148-147 BC, and about a kilometre long and some three metres wide.

=== Irish Dark Age (100 BC–AD 300) ===
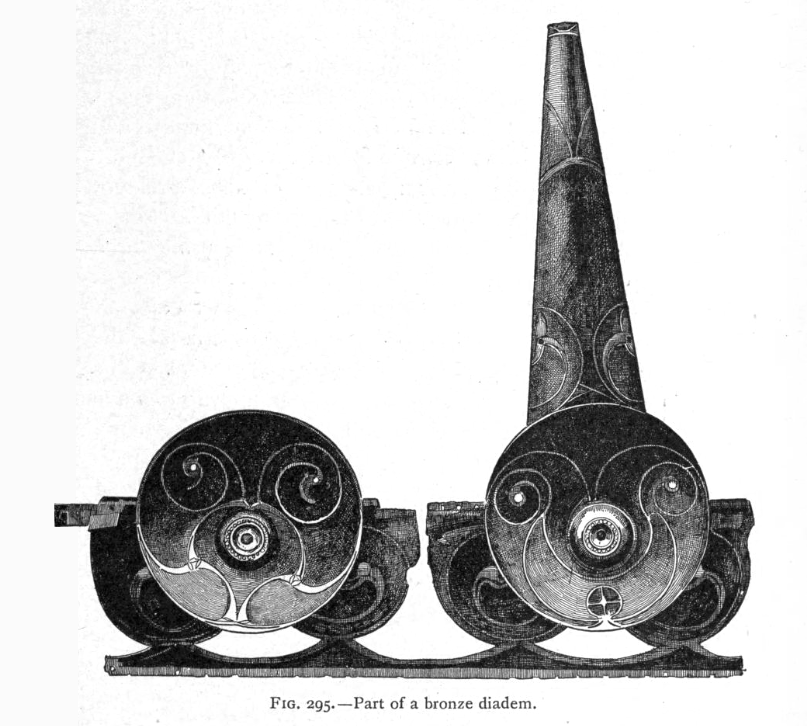
The Petrie Crown, c. 2nd century AD

The late Iron Age saw sizeable changes in human activity. Thomas Charles-Edwards coined the phrase "Irish Dark Age" to refer to a period of apparent economic and cultural stagnation in late prehistoric Ireland, lasting from c. 100 BC to c. AD 300. He used the phrase to describe a gap in the archaeological record coinciding with the Roman Empire in Britain and continental Europe. Charles-Edwards notes the lack of continuity between Ptolemy's writings on the peoples of second-century Ireland and writings in ogham in the fifth century. He suggested that the decrease in agricultural productivity might be due to a large-scale export of slaves to Roman Britain.

Others such as Joseph Raftery, Barry Raftery, and Donnchadh Ó Corráin have drawn attention to a decline in human settlement and activity in Ireland, starting from around the first century BC. Pollen data extracted from Irish bogs indicate a decrease in human impact on plant life in the bogs in the third century, and specifically that "the impact of human activity upon the flora around the bogs from which the pollen came was less between c. 200 BC and c. AD 300 than either before or after." The third and fourth centuries saw a rapid recovery.

The reasons for the decline and recovery are uncertain, but it has been suggested that recovery may be linked to the "Golden Age" of Roman Britain in the third and fourth centuries. The archaeological evidence for trade with, or raids on, Roman Britain is strongest in northern Leinster, centred on modern County Dublin, followed by the coast of County Antrim, with lesser concentrations in the Rosses on the north coast of County Donegal and around Carlingford Lough. As Roman Britain collapsed politically, there was even settlement by Irish people, and leaders, in Wales and western Britain. Inhumation burials may also have spread from Roman Britain, and had become common in Ireland by the fourth and fifth centuries.

Some protohistoric records begin to appear during this period. Early Irish literature was not written down until the early medieval period, but many scholars accept that the saga cycles preserve in some form elements from much earlier, that give some insights into the world of the last elites of prehistoric Ireland.

== Bog bodies ==
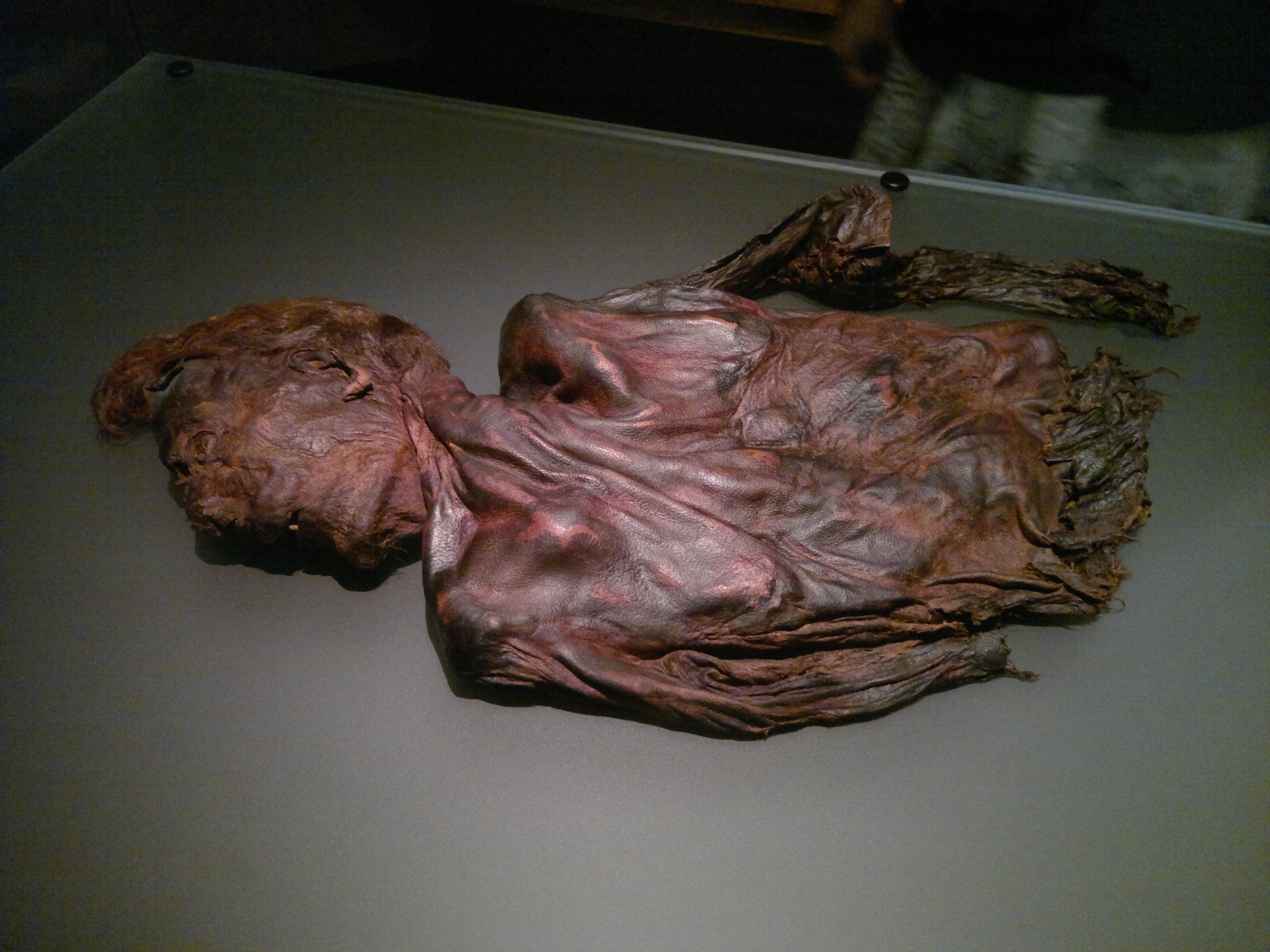
Clonycavan Man, died 392 –201 BC, NMI

The large areas of bog in Ireland have produced over a dozen ancient bog bodies, mostly from the Iron Age. Some were found and reburied before archaeological and scientific investigation was possible. Some survive as skeletons only, but the best-preserved have retained their flesh, hair, and clothing. The oldest appears to be the Neolithic Stoneyisland Man, perhaps the victim of a canoeing accident around 3320–3220 BC.

Cashel Man died violently about 2500-2000 BC in the early Bronze Age, and is one of the possible ritual killings; it is now thought these were deposed kings sacrificed after being seen to fail in their rule, perhaps after crop failures. Two Iron Age examples of apparent elite victims of ritual killing are Old Croghan Man and Clonycavan Man, both from approximately 400 to 175 BC. Earlier bodies appear to have been normal burials.

== Collections ==
Almost all prehistoric Irish finds remain in Ireland and Great Britain. Some are in local museums, but much the most significant collections are in Dublin, Belfast and London. The first "national" collection for Irish antiquities was the British Museum in London, where many finds from before and after it was established in 1753 have ended up. However, from the foundation of the Dublin Royal Irish Academy in 1785 there was a local rival, which became the main destination of objects that were newly-found, or appeared on the market. The Dublin Society also formed a collection, though this was less important for antiquities. The society was founded in 1731, and by 1733 had opened a museum. Both these collections were transferred to the new "Museum of Science and Art", now the National Museum of Ireland, by 1890.

A legal dispute in which the Crown challenged the British Museum's purchase of the Broighter Hoard was won in 1903, and marked the acceptance on all sides of the Dublin museum as the Irish national collection. This was a hoard found in what became Northern Ireland after Irish independence. Northern Ireland had seen its many important finds of antiquities passing to first London and then Dublin, and the Ulster Museum was only recognized as a national museum for antiquities in 1961. This had developed out of the collections of the Belfast Natural History Society, later renamed the Belfast Municipal Museum and Art Gallery, and was renamed again in 1961. Despite this, the pace of new finds has meant that it has an important collection.
