= Irish Mesolithic =

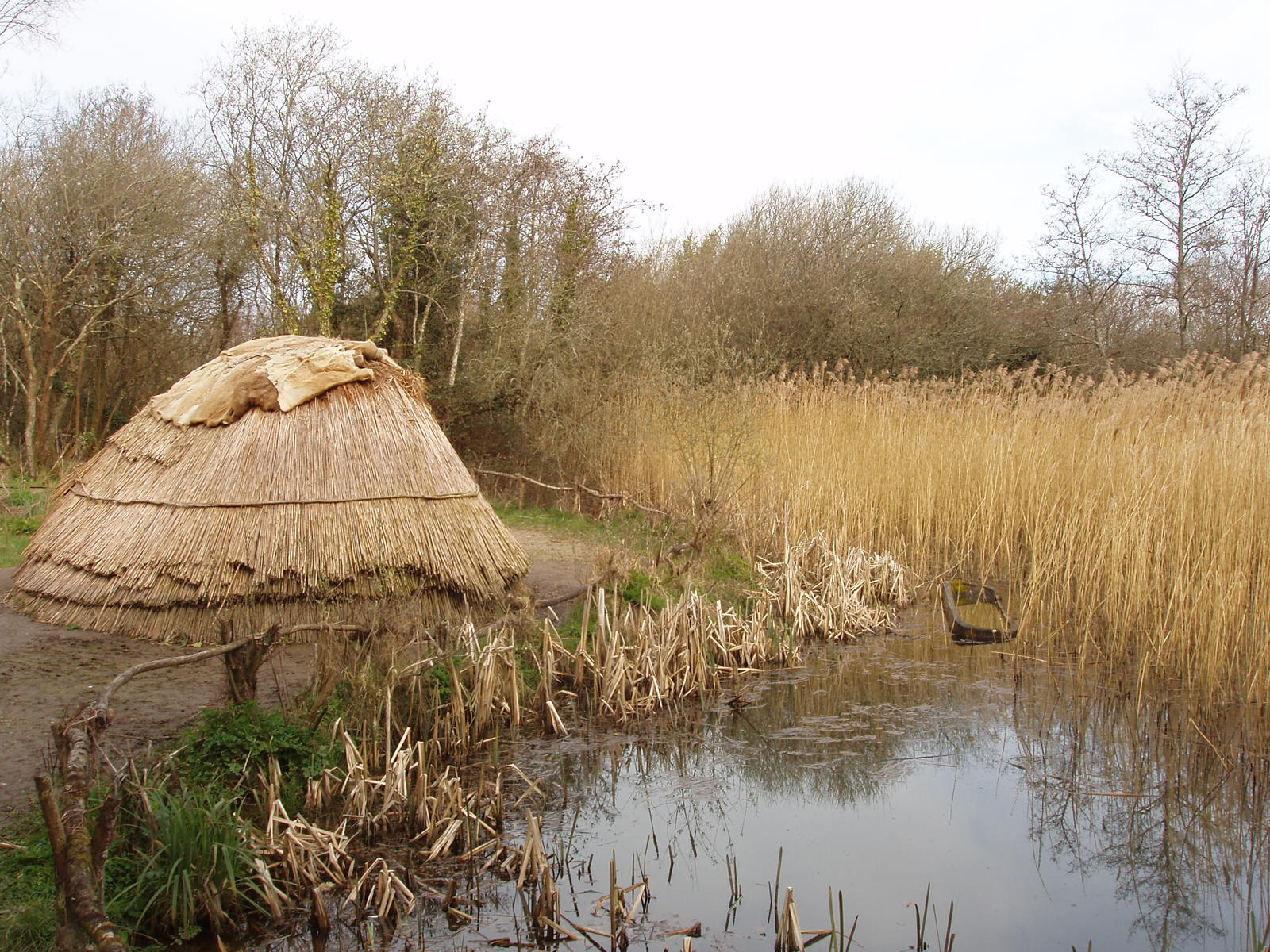
Reconstruction of a hunter-gatherer hut and canoe – Irish National Heritage Park, County Wexford

Evidence of human activity during the Mesolithic period in Irish history has been found in excavations at the Mount Sandel Mesolithic site in the north of the island, cremations on the banks of the River Shannon in the west, campsites at Lough Boora in the midlands, and middens and other sites elsewhere in the country.

== Early Mesolithic ==
The earliest known human burial in Ireland is dated to 7530-7320 BCE. It was on a bend of the River Shannon at Hermitage, County Limerick which shows the early inhabitants had begun to move inland along the rivers and were not confined to the sea shores at this early date. An adze in the burial is the earliest securely dated polished adze or axe found in Europe.

Another area of known Mesolithic activity in Northern Ireland was in the Ballmaglaff area of Dundonald, County Down. Over the years, it yielded thousands of pieces of struck flint.

== Later Mesolithic ==
=== Chronology & Technology ===
Prehistoric Ireland's Later Mesolithic period begins sometime between 7000 BC and 6000 BC with the occurrence of a pan-Ireland and Isle of Man macrolithic (large stone flake/blade) stone tool tradition: no transitional industry has yet been identified that bridges the gap between this industry and the Early Mesolithic microlithic (very small flake/blade) industry that preceded it.

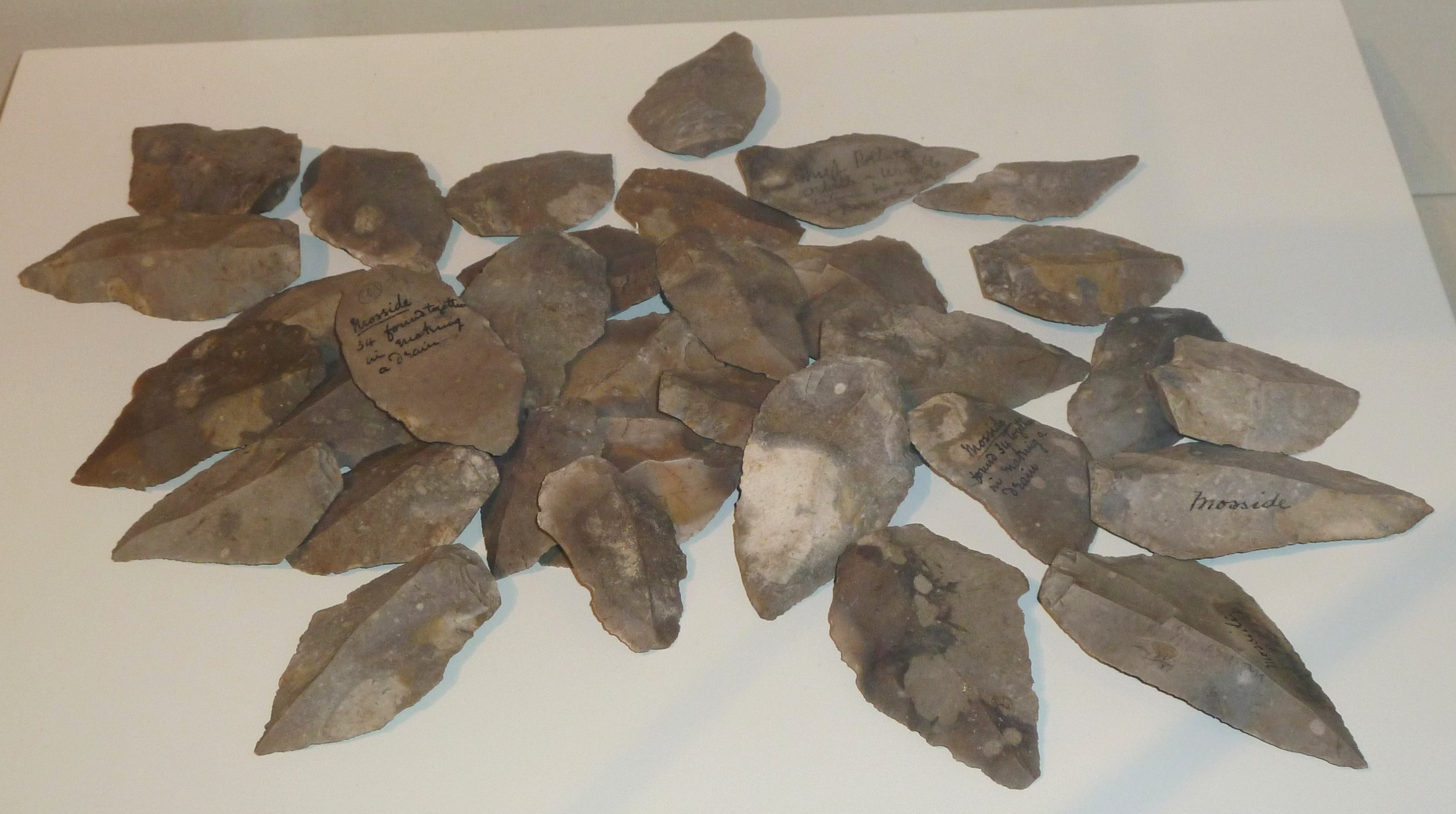
The Moss-side hoard of Mesolithic Bann flakes, Ulster Museum

The Later Mesolithic period ends around 4000 BC and is followed by a Neolithic lithic (stone tool) tradition based on hard and soft hammer percussion, indirect percussion, pressure flaking, and bifacing. As with the Early and Later Mesolithic, no artefacts have yet been found that represent a transition between the Later Mesolithic and Neolithic.

Until recently there have been few signs of variation across the approximately 2,000–3,000 years that comprise the Later Mesolithic period – no identifiable trends toward regionalization or intensification, no noteworthy differences in settlement patterns across space or time. However, as with all static models of human society, this one has reflected data with analytical and interpretative limitations rather than certainty.

The island's extensive bog and alluvial deposits have concealed informative settlement evidence and its acidic soils have decomposed and destroyed significant amounts of organic archaeological material. Furthermore, rising sea levels, which peaked between 4500 and 2000 BC, have eroded and submerged most of the coastal and estuarine evidence for foraging (hunting and gathering).

These conditions, along with a historical bias towards research in northeastern Ireland, make it clear that the record is incomplete. However, the gaps are not evenly distributed across the entire period. Anderson and Johnson have pointed out that the best lithic data for the Later Mesolithic are associated only with its last 500 years (4500-4000 BC).

Only at Newferry is there a chronological sequence which spans the known Later Mesolithic and except for zone 3, for which there are contemporary sites, there are no comparable assemblages for the remainder of the material. If all the contested material relates to the final phases of a period which lasted for at least 2,000 years, then with the exception of a very few sites, none of which contain all the elements of a lithic assemblage, there is a possibility that the material representative of the first 1,500 years is missing.

Thus, it is fair to say that much of the Later Mesolithic (c. 7-6000 - 4000 BC) is impressively underrepresented. Ironically, it is with the last part of the Later Mesolithic that some workers have become most frustrated, like Whittle, who was stymied by his research into Ireland's transition to the Neolithic:

Much further research is needed, and the outlook is unfortunately gloomy. Key sites of the right date will be hard to locate in river valleys and estuaries, and the funding of problem-oriented research is not easy. We may have to wait patiently for chance discoveries of the appropriate kind.

In truth, this pessimism might be better directed at the first three quarters of the Later Mesolithic, rather than the last quarter. The difference is not only in the availability of evidence, but also in the availability of new data arising from the evidence with the application of stable isotope analysis. Indeed, stable isotope analyses, in combination with the advantages of AMS dating, are cutting through the gloom and revealing glimpses of a surprisingly dynamic sixth millennium BP forager lifeway.

=== Later Mesolithic Mobility & Economy ===
The limited evidence for the Later Mesolithic from excavated sites and stray finds suggest a residential mobility strategy consisting of short-term food and raw material procurement and processing camps oriented toward coasts, estuaries, rivers and lakes. No inland, terrestrially-oriented sites have yet been identified. Regional surveys including the Lough Swilly Archaeological Survey in eastern County Donegal, the Bally Lough Archaeological Project in County Waterford and the broader Barrow Valley Archaeological Survey in southeast Ireland have confirmed this pattern.

Excavations at the floodplain site of Newferry in County Antrim, the coastal, industrial site of Bay Farm, also in County Antrim, and the coastal sites of Ferriter's Cove in County Kerry and Belderrig highlight the small-scale, short-term nature of occupations. Analyses of fish remains from the Ferriter's Cove excavation suggest a mid-summer to autumn use of that site by small groups of foragers. Preliminary work employing d18O stable isotope analysis of periwinkle (Littorina littorea) shells from a feature at Ferriter's Cove suggests another visit by foragers in the late autumn or, possibly, winter

Subsistence appears to have involved a broad spectrum of faunal resources: Newferry subsistence data have shown a focus on salmonids and eels; Ferriter's Cove has demonstrated exploitation of seafish, shellfish, and wild pig; and midden sites along the coast of the province of Leinster indicate consumption of sea mammals (e.g., seals), oysters, and limpets. Ireland lacked large terrestrial ungulates – for example, red deer (elk) – during the Later Mesolithic period.

Based on the settlement evidence, it is likely that population density was quite low. Following the lead of Milner and colleagues' calculations for Britain, if we take the low end of ethnographic forager population density estimates (0.1/km^{2}) and factor in Ireland's current area (84,000 km^{2}), we arrive at a population estimate of 8,400 individuals at any one time, spread thinly along the island's extensive coastlines, lakeshores and river valleys.

Later Mesolithic lithic technology and raw material procurement patterns reinforce the scenario of a generalized forager adaptation, i.e., one that is characterized by low population, high mobility, and egalitarian social organization. In addition to its macrolithic nature, one of the features of the Later Mesolithic toolkit that sets it apart from those outside Ireland is the fact that there is no stylistic variability in the broad blades and flakes found across the island. They all are made the same way – hard hammer percussion – and offer no hint of regional variation that might be indicative of differing social identities. Woodman cited this phenomenon as evidence for cultural insularity; Cooney and Grogan argued that it represented frequent interaction among forager groups; Kimball suggested it reflected an adaptation to a high mobility lifeway and variation in subsistence resource distribution. In truth, Later Mesolithic social identities might have been expressed through a completely different medium, such as tope-skin or pig-skin clothing, tattoos, canoe paddles, or some other material that has long since disintegrated.

== Mesolithic People of Ireland ==
Discoveries in ancient DNA have shown that the Mesolithic inhabitants of Ireland were dark skinned with blue eyes. These people were hunter gatherers and were populating the island for about 4,000 years before the arrival of Neolithic farmers.
