= Bann flake =

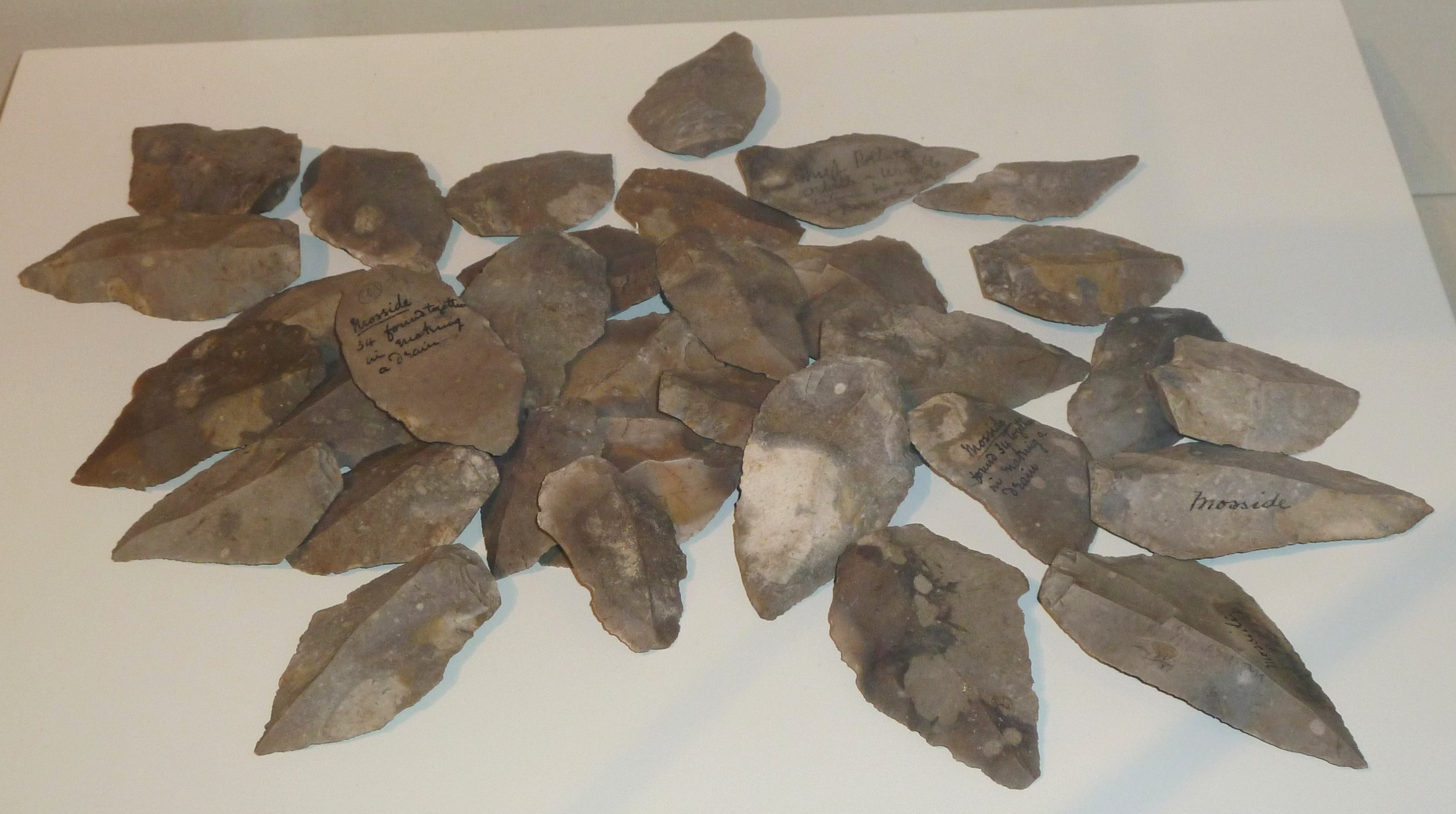
The Moss-side hoard of Mesolithic Bann flake tools and blades, Ulster Museum.

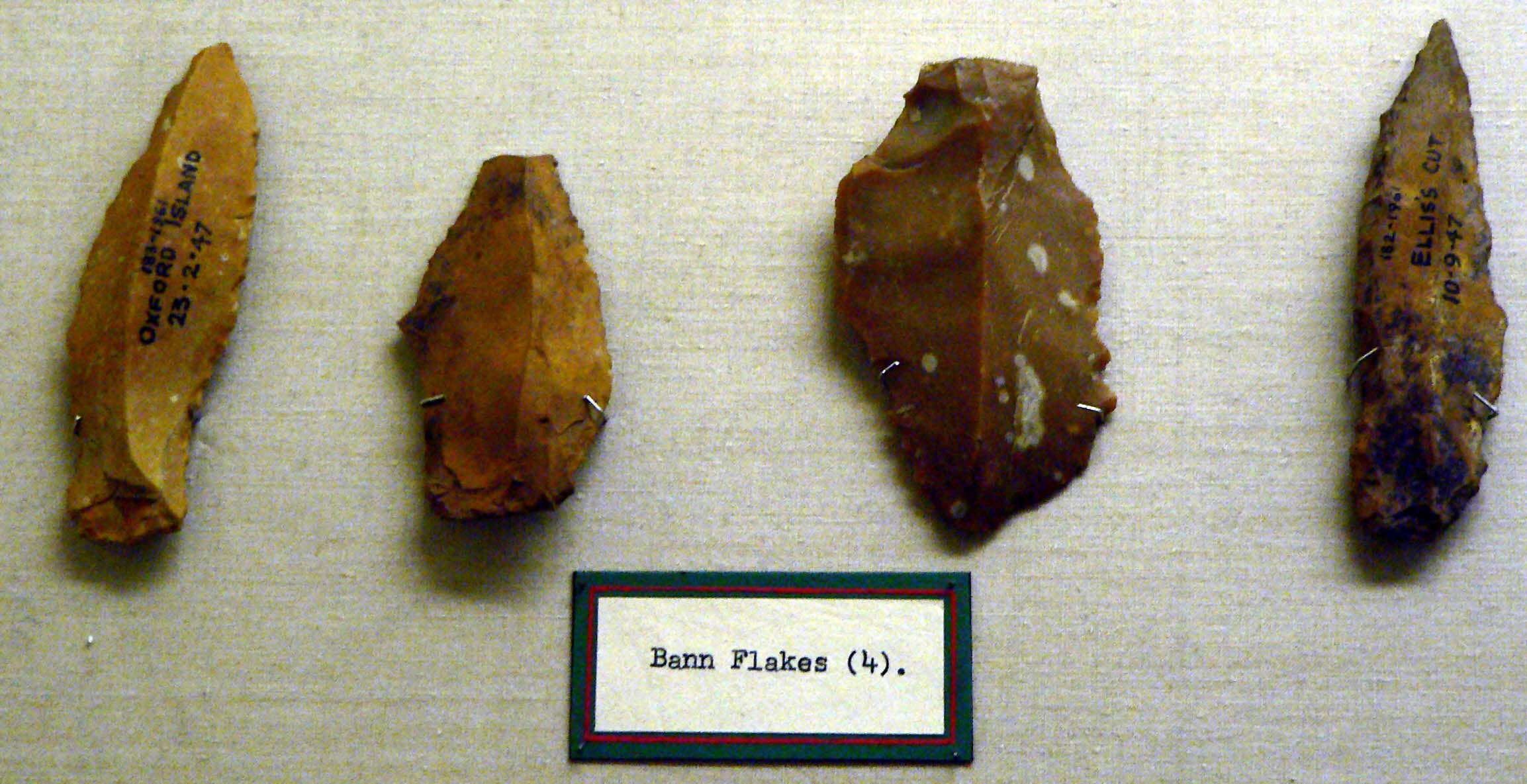
Four Bann flakes on display in Armagh County Museum.

A Bann flake is a large, butt-trimmed, leaf-shaped lithic blade of flint or chert, dating from the Late Mesolithic period of prehistoric Ireland, from around 4500 BC onwards. They are named after the river Bann in Northern Ireland where large numbers have been found. The term is rather variably defined, and the uses of the flakes probably varied considerably, with many being all-purpose tools, and perhaps weapons. Some were probably used as spear heads attached to wooden shafts, despite many being rather heavy for this.

They are part of the Bann culture assemblage. Peter Woodman of University College Cork defines them as large flakes without a significant tang, with only light retouch. They come in two forms: elongated or laminar forms less than 3.2 cm across, or wider leaf shapes having only very peripheral retouch at the butt.
