= Coriondi =

Early Irish population group

The Coriondi (Κοριονδοί) were a people of early Ireland, referred to in Ptolemy's 2nd century Geography as living in southern Leinster.

== Name ==
The stem *corio- ('army' or 'troop of warriors'), which is derived from Proto-Indo-European *kóryos ('army, people under arms'), also occurs in Gaulish and Brittonic personal and tribal names such as Coriosolites, Petrucorii, and Corionototae.

== Legacy ==
The Benntraige, a people dwelling in southern Ireland in pre-Christian times, might be a remnant of the tribe. Eoin MacNeill identified another later Irish group, the Coraind, in the Boyne valley, as possibly the same people.

Other possibly related names include the Corcu Cuirnd, Cuirennrige and Dál Cuirind in early medieval Ireland, and in Britain, the Corionototae, known from an inscription in Hexham, Northumberland, and Corinion, the Brittonic name for Cirencester, Gloucestershire.
