= Corionototae =

Ancient Britonic tribe

The Corionototae were a group of Ancient Britons apparently inhabiting what is now Northern England about whom very little is known. They were recorded in one Roman votary inscription (now lost) from Corbridge, of uncertain date, which commemorated the victory of a prefect of cavalry, Quintus Calpurnius Concessinius, over them.

Scholars tend to categorise them as a sub-group of the Brigantes in the absence of any information.

== Name ==
The name Coriono-totae is formed from two roots; either *korio- or *koriono-. from Indo-European *koryos- 'army', 'warband' and Celtic *touta 'tribe, people' ultimately derived from PIE *teutéh₁- ('people', perhaps 'people under arms'; cf. Old Irish túath 'tribe, people', Lithuanian tautà 'people', Gothic þiuda 'folk') Delamarre suggests a root *koriono- 'army-leader'; (cf. Greek koíranos, Old Norse herjann) so that the name would mean people of the chief, people of chiefs whereas the former derivation might suggest rather a military or political formation of several clans opposed to Rome.

T.M. Charles-Edwards proposed instead a tribal name based on an hypothetical deity *Corionos instead. On the basis of the similarity of the names, writers such as Charles-Edwards, Waldman and Mason have suggested a link with the Irish ethnonym Coriondi, while other earlier writers, erroneously linking the name to the Gaelic Cruthin, thought it could refer to the Picts.
