= Cliadh Dubh =

Iron Age linear earthwork

Claidh Dubh, an Iron Age linear earthwork located in south-west Ireland.

One of a number of Irish Iron Age linear earthworks, the Claidh Dubh ('the black ditch', anglicised variously as Clyduff, Cleeduff) stretches in a generally north–south direction between west Munster (Iarmumu) and east Munster (Ormond). Three sections survive, the longest stretching over twenty kilometers from the Ballyhoura Hills to the Nagle Mountains.

The exact function of each of the similar earthworks created in Iron Age Ireland remains uncertain, be they political partition or to prevent cattle raiding. Large gaps between surviving stretches may have utilised forestry which vanished in medieval times, but were as useful as man-made defences. William O'Brian (2012, p. 236) notes that the Cliadh Dubh marks the border between two different archaeological cultures.

== See also ==
- Black Pig's Dyke
- Dorsey, County Armagh
- The Knockans
