= Irish National Heritage Park =

Open-air museum in Ireland

Coordinates: 52.348°N 6.517°W

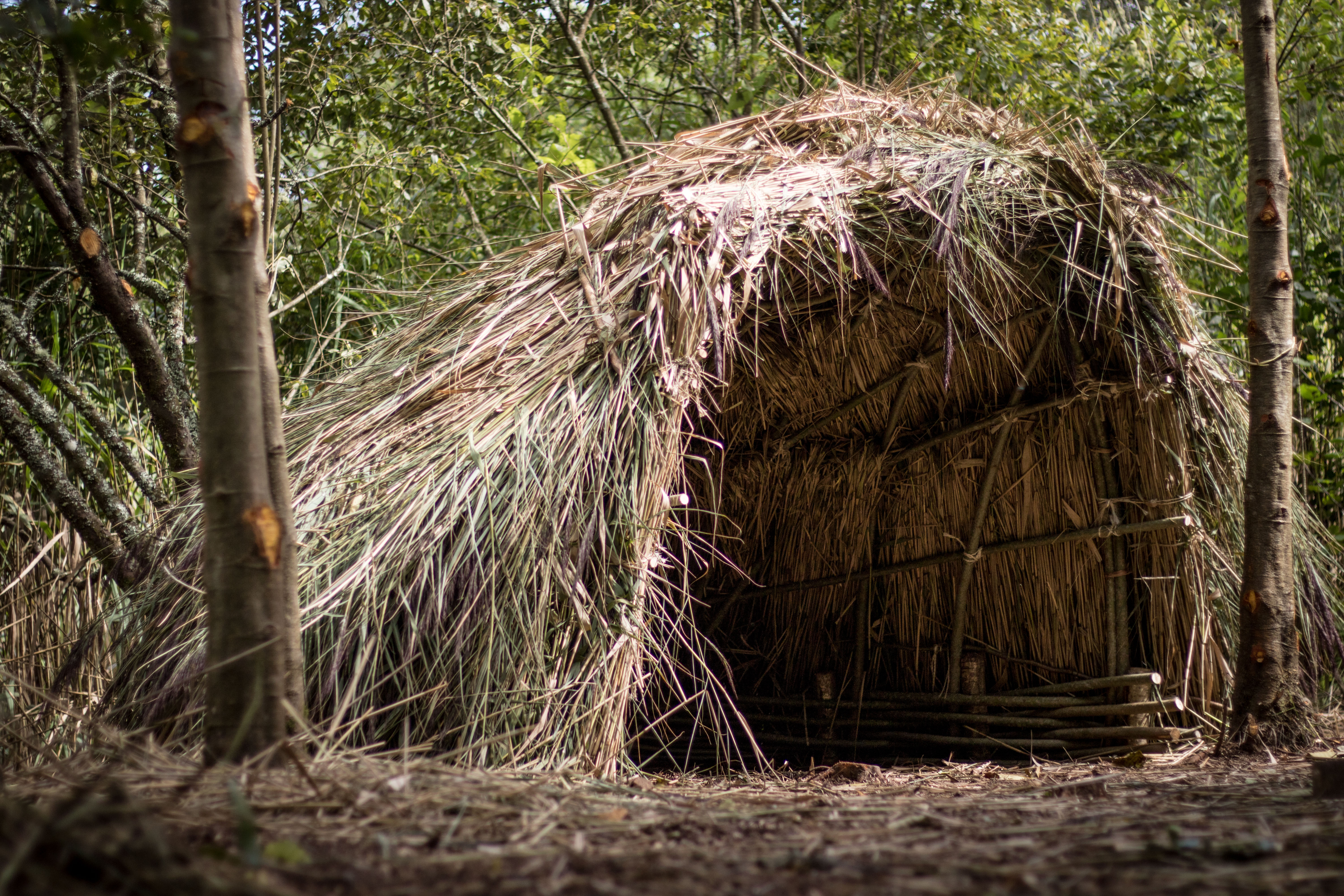
Reconstruction of a hunter-gatherer hut—Mesolithic period

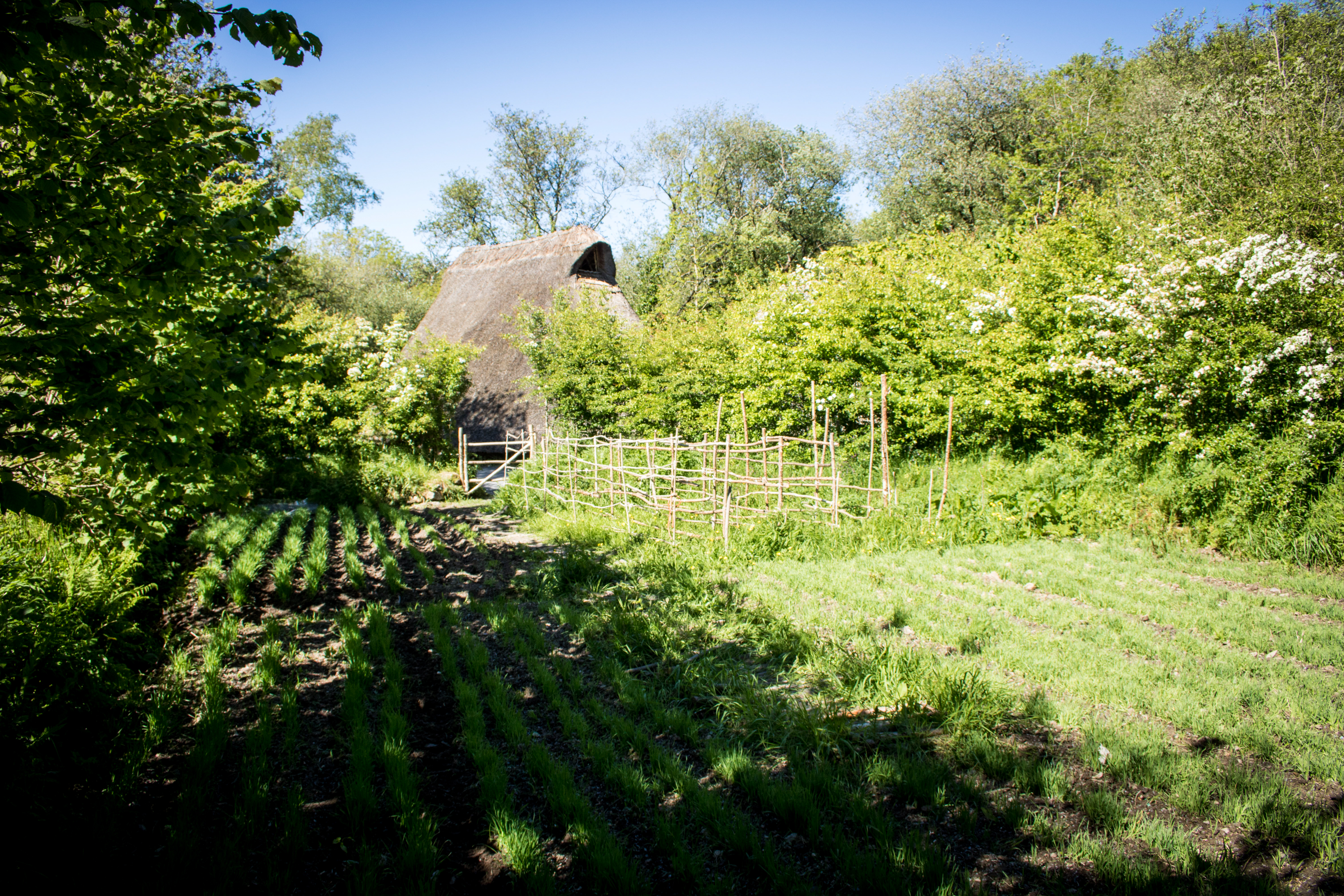
A reconstructed Neolithic farmstead from ~6,000 years ago

The Irish National Heritage Park is an open-air museum near Wexford, Ireland, which tells the story of human settlement in Ireland from the Mesolithic period up to the Norman Invasion in 1169. It was opened to the public in 1987.

The park contains 16 reconstructed dwellings, including a Mesolithic camp, a Neolithic farmstead, a portal dolmen, a cist grave, a stone circle, a medieval ringfort, a monastic site, crannóg, and a Viking harbour. It covers 13.7 hectares (34 acres) of parkland, estuary trails, and wetland forest. It is a nonprofit organisation and all of its receipts from admissions, restaurant, and shop sales go back into the maintenance of the park.

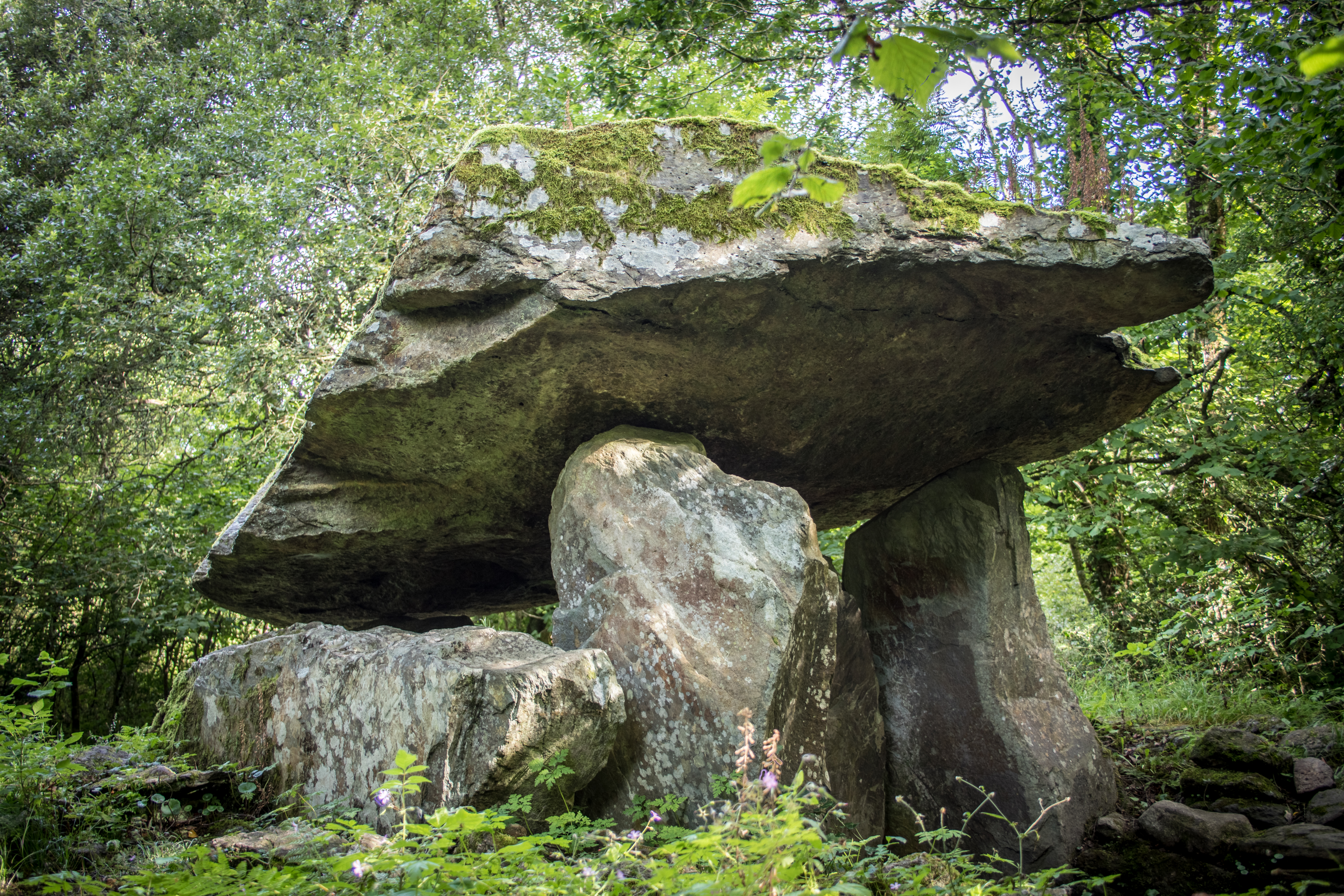
Portal Dolmen

== Courses and events ==
The park runs a selection of courses throughout the year ranging from blacksmithing and wood carving, to stone masonry and mounted combat. One of the goals of the park is to bring traditional skills back into the public. The Trials of Tuan are a set of activities for children. The park also offers guided tours led by costumed guides, as well as audio guides or self-guided options. The guided tour lasts about one and a half hours and ends at the reconstructed Viking harbour.

== Carrig ==
Among the sites in the park is an archaeological excavation at one of the first Norman fortifications in Ireland, on the hill of Carrig, overlooking the river Slaney. The park partnered with the IAFS (Irish Archaeology Field School) to excavate and research the site of the fortification. The site contains ringwork, burnt wooden structures, and a later stone castle. A town grew around the castle and existed until the 1300s.

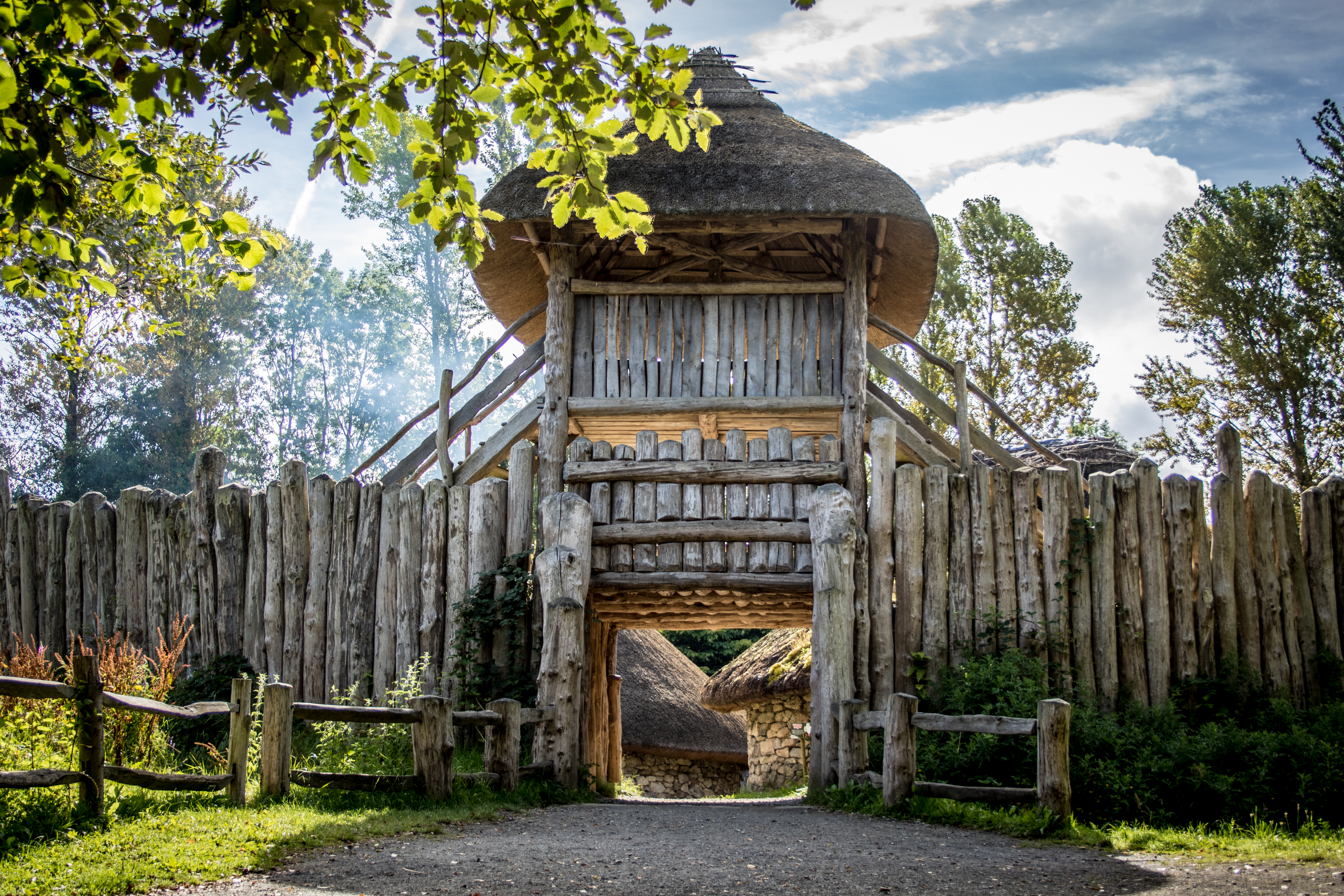
Ringfort

== See also ==
- Archaeological open-air museum
- Butser Ancient Farm, a similar site in England with reconstructions of Neolithic and Iron Age dwellings
- Castell Henllys, a reconstructed Iron Age village in Wales
