= 5th millennium BC =

Millennium between 5000 BC and 4000 BC

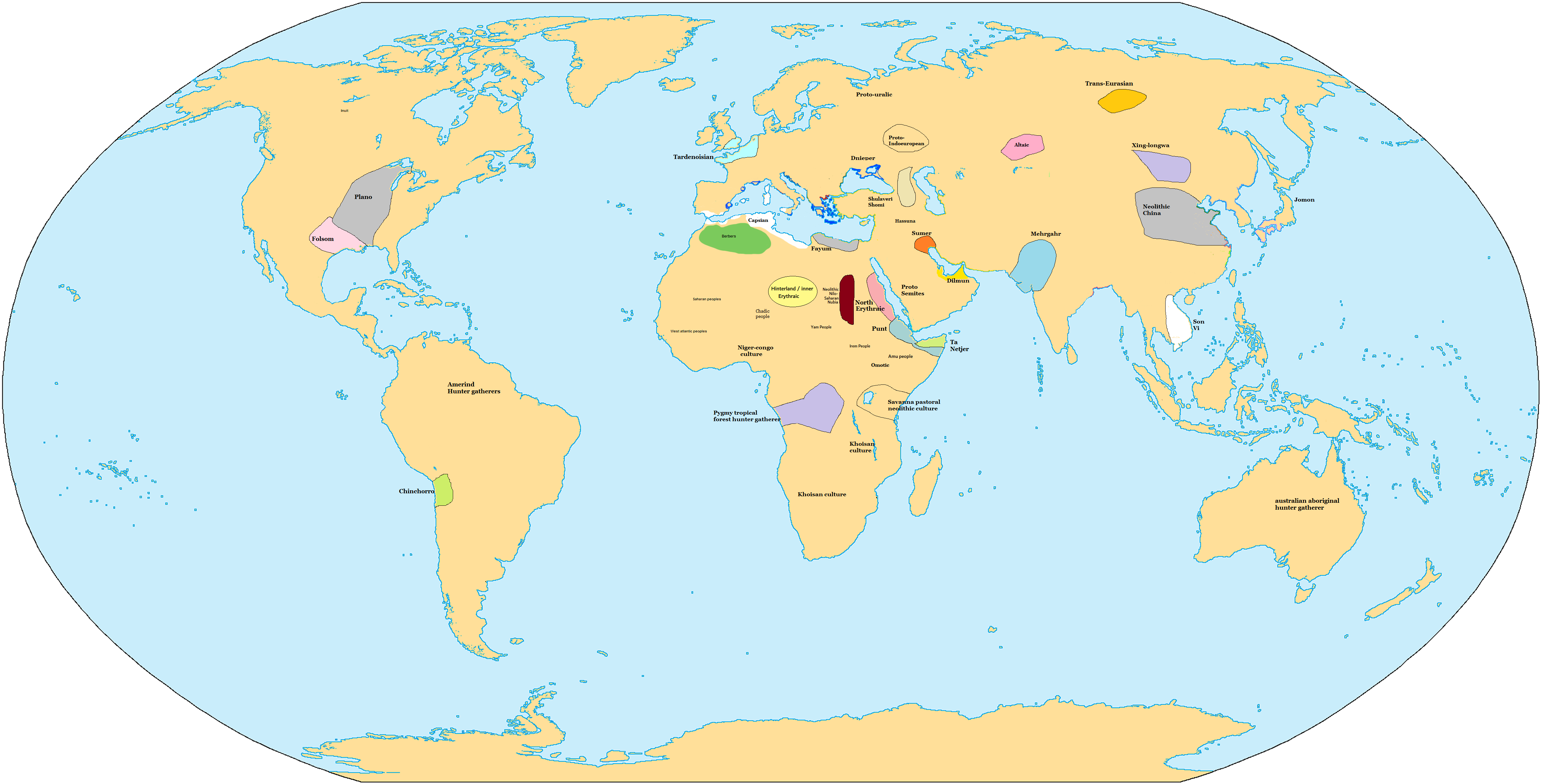
World map in 5000 BC

The 5th millennium BC spanned the years 5000 BC to 4001 BC. It is impossible to precisely date events that happened around the time of this millennium and all dates mentioned here are estimates mostly based on geological and anthropological analysis.

== Communities ==
The rapid world population growth of the previous millennium, caused by the Neolithic Revolution, is believed to have slowed and become fairly stable. It has been estimated that there were around forty million people worldwide by 5000 BC, growing to 100 million by the Middle Bronze Age c. 1600 BC.

=== Europe ===
- The Cucuteni–Trypillia culture (aka Tripolye culture) began around 4800 BC. It was centred on modern Moldova and lasted in three defined phases until c. 3000 BC.
- From about 4500 BC until c. 2500 BC, a single dialect called Proto-Indo-European (PIE) existed as the forerunner of all modern Indo-European languages, but it left no written texts and its structure is unknown.
- Vinca culture (5700–4200 BC) continues cultural traits of the prior millennium. It had the earliest form of proto-writing, suggesting a requirement for astrological, scientific, astronomical, or economical (trade) archives. This provides the earliest known example of copper smelting in the Old World, imperial-like social stratification with communal spaces, and large scale trade networks where its distinctive figurines reach as far as Western Europe. The culture ends with abandonment and conflicts circa 4200 BC.
- The distribution of Venus figurines from the previous agricultural revolution cements itself as mainstream art in Europe, continuing onward from the 6th millennium BC.
- Dimini culture first arises circa 4800 BC alongside the Late Neolithic period of Greece where increasing population densities are most notable. Over 400 years, Dimini imperially expands, later absorbing Sesklo culture completely before the final invasion and destruction of Sesklo c. 4400 BC. The Final Neolithic period arrives with the Chalcolithic period and increased cultural connection alongside trade routes to Anatolia.
- Uralic languages and cultures continue to expand and migrate. The Lyalovo culture (c. 5000–3650 BC) has been equated with the Proto-Uralic urheimat alongside cultural relationship with the Comb Ceramic culture.
- Megalithic constructions continue all over Western Europe, with increasing social stratification and social complexity. See the timeline. One most notable site is the Locmariaquer megaliths, the highest being 20.60 metres (67.6 ft) tall and over 330 tons and served as a site of pilgrimage and inspiration. The complex construction of such megaliths all over Europe are representative of the power of the social elite, religious clergy, direct communication over vast distances of land, and large labour forces.
- Long distanced Eastern trade from Danubian and Caucasus civilizations to Indo-European steppe cultures with social stratification and royal chiefs of their own. Considerable Danubian influence on Central European polities and cultures must also be considered.
- A second wave of the Danubian culture, which used painted pottery with Asiatic influences, superseded the first phase starting around 4500 BC. This was followed by a third wave, which used stroke-ornamented ware. These elements of imports and artistic licensing represent complex cultural developments. Alongside this, the infamous Varna culture thrives, beginning circa 4600 BC to 4200 BC reflecting Kingship.
- Hamangia culture lasts until 4550 BC. Its cultural links with Anatolia suggest that it was the result of settlement by people from Anatolia, unlike the neighbouring cultures, which appear descended from earlier Neolithic settlement. Such migrations represent strong communication systems between large stretches of land, political motives and a further indication of the Black Sea trade most notable of the period via seafaring and land.
- Mediterranean trade networks are long forged, with complex economical activities by polities, stretching from the Adriatic to Portugal and parts of North Africa see economy and Neolithic.
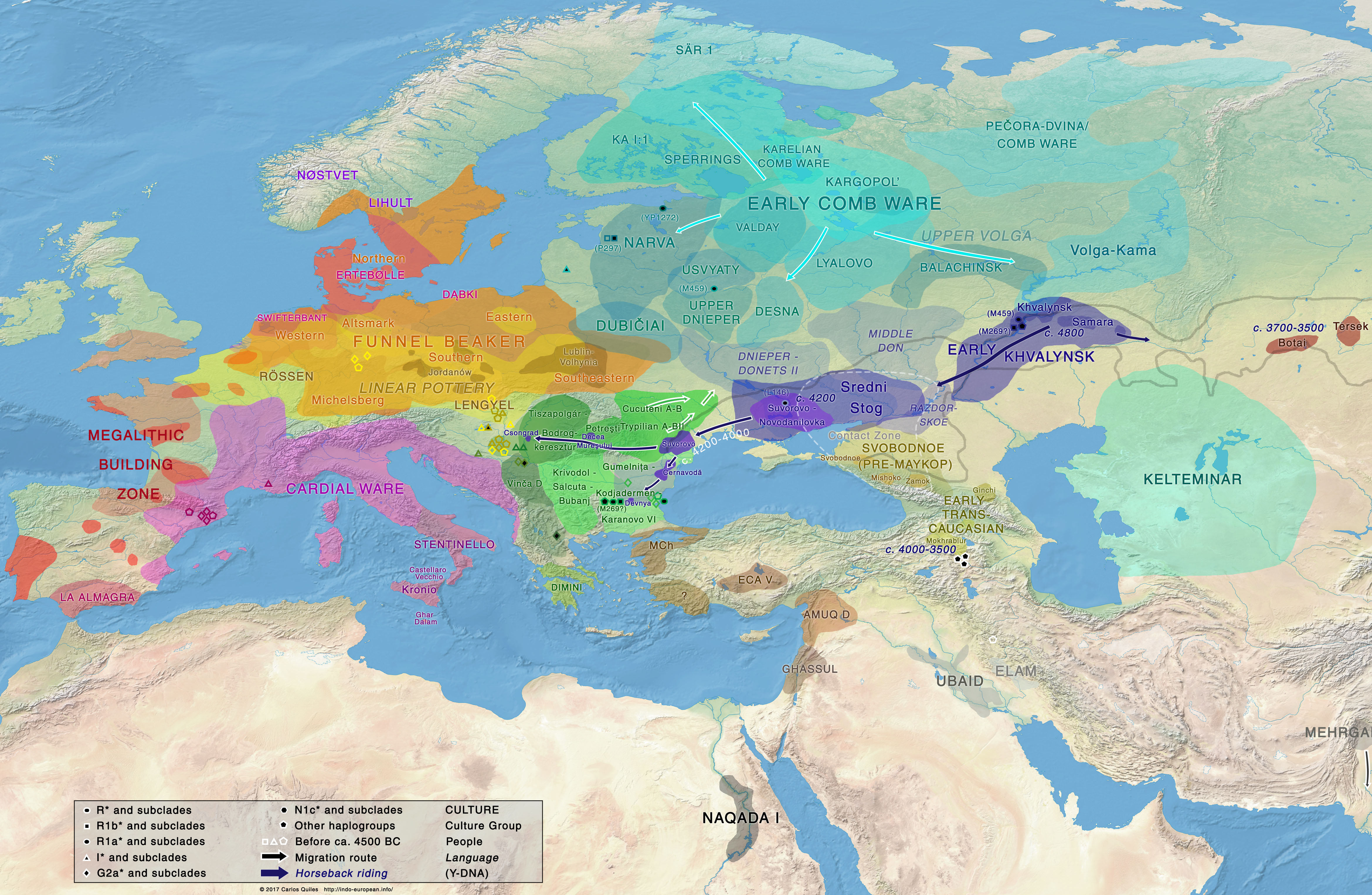
  Neolithic migrations in Europe c. 5000–4000 BC. The people of the Proto-Indo-European Sredny Stog culture were the result of a genetic admixture between the Eastern hunter-gatherers and Caucasus hunter-gatherers.

The Stentinello culture stretches from Sicily and Calabria to the Aeolian Islands representing cultural focus on seafaring and maritime trade at this time. Sardinia has close trade relations with the Mediterranean Neolithic communities of southern France, the Iberian Peninsula, the Italian peninsula and Sicily and is a major participant of the silver trade.

- Trade via seafaring and ports between Western Hunter Gatherers in Ireland and cultures in Neolithic Western Europe (circa 4000 BC) (Ferriter's Cove).
- Neolithic Britain circa 4100 experiences rapid mass migration and settlement into the Isles. Deforestation on a momentous scale in Neolithic Britain. (4300 BC to 3250 BC), associated with the Windmill Hill culture, increased population density, outcompeting the West Hunter Gatherer populations.
- First major Indo European migration (circa 4000 BC). Migrates southwards via the Danube eventually reaching Anatolia. Danubian migrations occur westerwards onwards from this upheaval. Danubian civilization and culture such as the Cucuteni-Trypillia culture will survive on until the late 4th millennium or very early 3rd millennium BC.
- Neolithic farming guilds and polities maintain a relatively fixed frontier in Northern Central Europe (modern-day Germany), allowing Scandinavian Hunter Gatherer polities to later develop into the Pitted Ware Culture (circa 3500 BC).
- The Warren Field calendar originating from the Mesolithic continues to be experimented upon and further alongside mathematics, which is developed across all of Europe by various polities continuously through the 5th millennium.
- Alongside megalithic monuments or tomb with high social and astronomical importance to polities of the era, stone circles are erected as far as France, see the Carnac stones.

=== West Asia ===
==== Mesopotamia ====
- Ubaid expansion continues into the early 5th millennium, with demographic integration of Ubaid culture by Halafians alongside invasions by Ubaid polities. One example of violence is Tell Arpachiyah a key economical hub of pottery manufacture. Another is Tepe Gawra. Obsidian, cedar, advancement of the potters wheel circa 4500 BC, silver, cattle and copper trade routes for over a millennia are strengthened as a result of these expansions, between Anatolia, Iran, the Caucasus and South Iraq.

Its chronology within the 5th millennium consists of:

- Ubaid 1, sometimes called Eridu corresponding to the city Eridu, (5400–4700 BC), a phase limited to the extreme south of Iraq, on what was then the shores of the Persian Gulf. This phase, showing clear connection to the Samarra culture to the north. These people pioneered the growing of grains in the extreme conditions of aridity.
- Ubaid 2 occurs circa 4800–4500 BC. At that time, Hadji Muhammed style ceramics was produced. This period also saw the development of extensive canal networks near major settlements. New highly developed irrigation systems, which seems to have developed first at Choga Mami (4700–4600 BC) and rapidly spread elsewhere.
- Ubaid 3: Tell al-Ubaid style ceramics. Traditionally, this ceramic period was dated c. 5300–4700 BC. The appearance of these ceramics received different dates depending on the particular sites, which have a wide geographical distribution portraying widespread trade systems and social stratification.
- Ubaid 4: Late Ubaid style ceramics, circa 4700 – 4200 BC. Maritime trade via the Persian Gulf peaks, connecting to Southern Iranian ports and polities. Obsidian trade is most notable with extraction and transportation to industrial style workshops over a 170 km distance, see Hamoukar.Southern expansions continue Southwards to Oman.

Overall, the Ubaid period experiences sporadic but controlled growth of socially stratified settlements, with communal areas, segregation of classes per quarters and complex social stratification. Increased conflict between democratic councils, large scale chiefdoms, royalties, polities and imperial-like aspirations. Large scale stone masonry for public use, and organised seal estampage of international importance are associated characteristics of the era. P. Amiet sees as a 'proto-royal figure,' i.e., potentially Enki, preceding the 'priest-kings' of the 4th millennium. Of the hundreds of polities and tens of important city states here are a few notable events:

- Eridu during the Ubaid period the site extended out to an area of about 12 hectares (about 30 acres). Twelve neolithic clay tokens, the precursor to Proto-cuneiform, were found in the Ubaid levels of the site.[7][8] The city was the major power at least in the first half of the 5th millennium. It would go on to decline in sovereignty within the 4th millennium. It is here where the first Kings of Sumer were said to have once dwelt.
- One major polity of the Ubaid period is Tell Brak a very large polity with transregional power with city walls, and a Tell Brak expansion beyond the mound to form a lower town. By the late 5th millennium BC, Tell Brak reached the size of c. 55 hectares. The remains of a monumental building alongside other large scale projects erected with two meters thick walls and a basalt threshold reveals a social elite of extreme prowess.
- Another major polity is Uruk (founded circa 5000 BC), experiences a rapid increase in dominance, establishing itself beyond merely a regional power circa 4500 BC with the Eanna quarter or district first constructed. Uruk in its climb for dominance would go on to construct the Anu Ziggurat circa 4000 BC. It is these centuries of careful development that gave Uruk its legendary dominance later in the 4th millennium during the Uruk Expansion.
- Some other polities of note are firstly Tepe Gawra featuring signs of notable conflict during the prior Ubaid expansion. Weapons smithing, copper trade and notable temples built circa 4200 BC are present.
- Ur experienced repeated flooding alongside the other city states, due to continuous floods of the Euphrates within this era. Ur would later rise to great prominence in the mid to late 3rd millennium BC.
- Chogha Mish grew into its maximum size of 17 hectares in the Late Susiana period, and was dominant onwards from the 6th millennium. However the early half of the 5th millennium, the Chogha Mish main monumental building was destroyed and along with it its power declined. This became known as the 'Burnt Building'. This destruction of Chogha Mish also coincided with the abandonment of some other sites on the eastern part of the Susiana plain. The settlements of the subsequent period shifted more to the west, especially with the founding and rise of the city of Susa.
- The south-western part of Iran after 4400 BC restarts urbanisation, with large scale settlements such as Susa (founded possibly as early as 4395 cal BC via Ubaid urbanisation and influence). The region around Susa in the southwest of modern Iran, is located right next to lower Mesopotamia, which exercised a powerful influence on Uruk and its neighbours from the 5th millennium. Susa I (4000 – 3700 BC) saw the beginning of monumental architecture on the site, with the construction of a 'High Terrace'. Susa alongside its allies is invaded and destroyed in c. 4200 BC. The city of Anshan is founded circa 4000 BC, and alongside Susa begins to separate itself culturally from the West, developing the lands with its newly integrated peoples into a Proto-Elamite cultural and economic revolution.

==== Ulterior Middle East ====
In modern Turkey: Strong Anatolian polities counteract the balance of power from the Ubaid polities and dwaining Samarrans who were culturally assimilated around 4800 BC. Such polities include Mersin notably having a standing army circa 4300 BC, and Hamoukar, which was a major production centre in the important Obsidian trade and thus power. An intensive copper trade, connecting Europe with the East, is represented in Anatolia by sites at Hacılar Höyük, Beycesultan, Canhasan, Mersin Yumuktepe, Elazig Tepecik, Malatya Degirmentepe, Norşuntepe, and Istanbul Fikirtepe.

Prior environmental devastation in the previous two millennia may account for the lack of Neolithic sites in northern Turkey.

In the Levant: Ghassulian culture thrives, immigrating from the North into the whole of the Levant circa 4400 BC. With concentrated settlements and elites economically focused on copper metallurgy and trade, notably importing from Southern Jordan's vast and powerful urban polities and Bedouin-like cultures. The Ghassulian culture trades and correlates closely with the Amratians of Egypt and also seems to have affinities (e.g., the distinctive churns, or "bird vases") with early Minoan culture in Crete.[3][6] Cypriot affinities are not seen, with Cyprus experiencing newcomers circa 4500 BC who arrived and introduced a new Neolithic era. This Sotira culture replaced the void of the collapse of the 6th millennium Neolithic culture in Cyprus.

Trade with Levant and external regions on an impressive scale and covering large distances starts to connect Europe with Asia on a more direct scale than before. Obsidian found in the Chalcolithic levels at Gilat, Israel have had their origins traced via elemental analysis to three sources in Southern Anatolia: Hotamis Dağ, Göllü Dağ, and as far east as Nemrut Dağ, 500 km (310 mi) east of the other two sources. This is indicative of a very large trade circle reaching as far as the Northern Fertile Crescent and Anatolia.

In the Caucasus: Settlements of the 5th millennium BC in North Caucasus attest to a material culture that was related to contemporaneous archaeological complexes in the northern and western Black Sea region like the Leyla-Tepe culture (c. 4300 – 4000BC). These polities were immense economically, and pioneered copper metallurgy and trade. Constant immigration from Ubadians and from Uruk herself did play economic factors as well.

Such cultural elements change and are replaced, suddenly during the latter first half of the 4th Millennium BC, and the quality of copper metallurgy declines somewhat, during the Kura–Araxes culture.

On the other hand, the millennia long attested Shulaveri–Shomu culture showed stronger cultural connections like similar tool kits and use of red ochre, portrays intimate and centuries-old ties with the Halafians.

In Arabia: Continuation of Ubaid economical expansion and culture(since the 6th millennium BC, circa 5500 BC) throughout Arabia, with adoption and integration but also contributions to these new political features. Ubaid pottery of periods 2 and 3 has been documented at site H3 in Kuwait and in Dosariyah in eastern Saudi Arabia, which bordered the Persian Gulf, a major trade hub.

=== Central Asia (North and South) ===
Central: A millennium after the Iranian farmer cultures had first cemented with ancestry from the Caucasus and Iranian plateau hunter-gatherers and middle east, (circa 6000 BC) in Pakistan and north-west India and migrations from southwest Asia had resulted in increasing urbanisation and increasing social stratification. Such cultures include:

- The Jeitun culture (or Djeitun) had housed settlements and had culturally united Southern Turkmenistan to Afghanistan, existing for over 2000 years already at the turn of the millennium until 4600 BC. Increasing aridity in the late Neolithic i.e., Chagylly Depe, internationally farmers increasingly grew the kinds of crops that are typically associated with irrigation in an arid environment, such as hexaploid bread wheat, which became predominant during the Chalcolithic period.
- Increasing rapid migrations from Iran, with various waves bringing advanced metallurgy and other innovations, but it is thought that the newcomers soon blended with the Jeitun farmers. A large portion of these peoples settled in Anau, Turkmenistan founded circa 4500BC. The Anau culture, beginning just before 4000 BC contemporary with the Namazga culture, was a bridgeway between East and West, with considerable Chinese and Iranian influence in the use of its stamp seals in the great trade routes. Lapis Lazuli was imported from mining Kingdoms in Afghanistan to workshops.
- Mehrgarh culture in modern Pakistan was the largest urban and trade centre between East, South and West Asia. It pioneered metallurgy for millennia, tanning, bead production, use of the potter's wheel, wax making, mathematics, geometry, medicine and in advancement of economic specialisations. Glazed faience beads were produced and terracotta figurines became more detailed alongside direct trade from polities as far as present-day Badakshan for lapis lazuli. Mehrgarh Periods II and III are also contemporaneous with an expansion of the settled populations of the borderlands at the western edge of South Asia, including the establishment of settlements like Rana Ghundai, Sheri Khan Tarakai, Sarai Kala, Jalilpur, and Ghaligai. The trade hub already been difficult to control due to its scale would then receive high levels of immigration from West Eurasia around 4000 BC to 3800 BC.
- The term Ceramic Mesolithic is used of late Mesolithic cultures of Central Asia, during the 6th to 5th millennium BC (in Russian archaeology, these cultures are described as Neolithic even though farming is absent). These nomadic societies who had animal husbandry had pottery via cultural diffusion and trade of the previous millennia from Lake Baikal in Siberia and from Europe. From there spread via the Dnieper-Donets culture to the Narva culture of the Eastern Baltic. See the History of Central Asia for more detail.
- Scattered nomadic groups maintained herds of sheep, goats, horses, and camels, and conducted annual migrations to find new pastures (a practice known as transhumance). The people lived in yurts (or gers) – tents made of hides and wood that could be disassembled and transported. Each group had several yurts, each accommodating about five people.
- Ancestors to the Afanasevo culture (c. 3500–2500 BCE) inhabit the regions of modern Xinjiang. They are culturally and genetically affiliated with the Indo-European-associated cultures of the Eurasian Steppe despite predating great eastern expansions from the steppe of the 3rd millennium BC.
- Tibetan cultures and settlements have been found mainly "in river valleys in the south and east of the country". Archaeological sites consist of those in Nyingchi County, Medog County, and Qamdo County. Archaeologists have found pottery and stone tools, including stone axes, chisels, knives, spindle-whorls, discs, and arrowheads, alongside engagement in ancestor worship and priest classes.
- By 4000 BCE, the Tibeto-Burmese cultures had reached Nepal either directly across the Himalayas from Tibet or via Myanmar and north-east India or both. This is representative of conflicts with the Sino-Tibetan language expansions.

Modern Dravidian (Geographically in India) peoples (not to be confused with the language) whose history predates the onset of the Bronze Age in the Indian subcontinent (around 3300 BC) inhabited the area before the arrival of other ethnic groups like the Tibeto-Burmans and Indo-Aryans from across the border.

North:

- The original homeland of the Indo Europeans' ancestors in the Palaeolithic, the Northern and Eastern Siberian cultures did not have any agricultural introduction or even pastoralism in Siberia during the central European Neolithic. Its cultures is characterized by characteristic stone production techniques and the presence of pottery of eastern origin via trade despite West Eurasian genetics. However, the neolithic cultures of North Asia are distinguished from the preceding Mesolithic cultures and are far more visible as a result of the introduction of pottery from Southwards. The Afanasevan population was a mix of people descended from a mother culture of Indo Europeans in central Russia, and from people who migrated back c. 3700–3300 BCE across the Eurasian Steppe from the pre-Yamnaya Repin culture of the Don-Volga region. Such migrations including early Uralic Eastern migrations into North Asia from Eurasia, which started and occurred during the mid 5th millennium.

Significant linguistic connections are made with the precursor to the Proto-Indo European languages (circa 4500 BC), via the Eurasiatic language and parts of the Dravidian language to a prior language family during the Upper Palaeolithic. Dravidian having multiple cultural origins and development over millennia can be considered just as influential on an international scale as the Indo European languages from the 5th millennium BC to the 1st millennium AD. Such influence has been explored, such examples are the Elamo-Dravidian languages, a family that would have pioneered Susa, Central Mesopotamia, trade and politics within the Ubaid era.

South:

- Some Dravidian cultures formed from an admixture event between primarily Neolithic or Pre-Neolithic hunter-gatherers in India, and farmers, from the Iranian Plateau, sharing deep ancestry with "Neolithic Iranian farmers" and other West Eurasians, and indigenous South Asian hunter-gatherers (also known as "Ancestral Ancient South Asians" AASI), distantly related to the Andamanese and other East Eurasians.

These Southern migrations into India contributed to parts of the Proto-Dravidian language, having multiple variants i.e., Proto-South Dravidian language based on geographical location, however the language itself is known to have largely been native to central India as well. This melting pot of cultures peaked from the 5th millennium BC into the 4th millennium BC.

- Megaliths in South Asia are dated before 3000 BC, with recent findings dated back to 5000 BC in southern India. Cultures within central India had metallurgy, trade, payment of dues (possibly taxes or contributions to religious ceremonies) and social stratification explored within the linguistics of the era.

Indian Y-lineages are close to southern European populations and the time of divergence between the two predated Steppe migration:

These results suggest that the European-related ancestry in Indian populations might be much older and more complex than anticipated, and might originate from the first wave of agriculturists millennia before the 5th Millennium BC.

— Mondal et al. 2017

=== East Asia ===
==== China ====
Chinese civilisation advanced in this millennium with the beginnings of three noted cultures from around 5000 BC. The Yangshao culture was based in the Huang He (Yellow River) basin and endured for some 2,000 years. It is believed that pigs were first domesticated there. Pottery was fired in kilns dug into the ground and then painted. Millet was cultivated. A type-site settlement for the Yangshao was established c. 4700 BC at Banpo near modern Xi'an, Shaanxi.

Also about 5000 BC, the Hemudu culture began in eastern China with cultivation of rice, and the Majiabang culture was established on the Yangtze estuary near modern Shanghai, lasting until c. 3300 BC.

=== Oceania ===
- The powerful chiefdoms of the Proto-Papuan polities continue to practice and advance their agricultural system. In the form of ancient irrigation systems in the highlands of Papua New Guinea, are being studied by archaeologists. The New Guinea Highlands with immense population density were an early and independent center of agriculture, with evidence of irrigation going back at least 10,000 years. Sugarcane continued to be farmed on mass scale since 6000 BC. Melanesian peoples and tribes continue to inhabit and thrive in Melenasia.
- Mesolitihic hunter-gatherers continue to dominate most parts of Indonesia. Notable cultures are the Toalean culture. Trade and intercourse between the separated lands of Australia and Indonesia continued across the newly formed Torres Strait, whose 150 km-wide channel remained readily navigable with the chain of Torres Strait Islands and reefs affording intermediary stopping points.
- Ancestors of the Polynesians arrived in the Bismarck Archipelago of Papua New Guinea at least 6,000 to 8,000 years ago, representing an early phase of colonisation. Examination of mitochondrial DNA lineages shows that they have been evolving in ISEA for longer than previously believed. These Polynesian polities did not adopt nor intermarry on a large with the Australo-Melanesians like the Austronesians in Island Melanesia had done so. Regardless, both show admixture, along with other Austronesian populations outside of Taiwan, indicating varying degrees of intermarriage between the incoming Neolithic Austronesian settlers and the preexisting Paleolithic Australo-Melanesian populations of Island Southeast Asia and Melanesia as early as the late 5th millennium BC. Immense population densities, and urbanised cultures in Taiwan and China made these early explorers and group explore what was beyond the frontier, Eastwards of coastal China herself.
- The very earliest wave of Austronesian migrants, originating ultimately from Taiwan, arrived in Melanesia, circa 4000 BC. They settled mostly along the north coast of New Guinea and on the islands to its north and east. When they arrived, they came into contact with the much more ancient indigenous Papuan-speaking peoples. These earliest colonisations by Austronesian peoples will pale in comparison to the later more rapid and expansive waves in the great Austronesian expansion (also called the "Out of Taiwan" model).

==== Australia ====
It is estimated that the distinctive Aboriginal rock carvings near Sydney were created sometime between 5000 BC and 3000 BC.

Sea levels had become relatively stabilized by the time of 4500 BC around the coastlines of Australia. This occurred after several thousands of years of sea level rising, due to glaciers melting after the Younger Dryas event. This knowledge was passed down in oral history among the Aboriginal tribes of Australia as they recalled the drastic sea level rises that ended up swallowing their once lower coastlines.

Around the time of the 5th Millennium BC, there was a proliferation of stone tool, plant processing and landscape modification technologies. Elaborate fish and eel traps involving channels up to three kilometres long were in use in western Victoria from about 6,500 years ago. Semi-permanent collections of wooden huts on mounds also appeared in western Victoria, associated with a more systematic exploitation of new food sources in the wetlands.

The Furneaux Group, which is a set of islands off the Northeast portion of Tasmania, had been inhabited since at least 33,000 BC, but the Aboriginal Tasmanians stopped living there permanently around the time of 4,000 BC.

Rock art in the Northern Territory of Australia, specifically from the area of Arnhem Land is said to have a portion of its depictions dating to around 4,000 BC, which show battle scenes or skirmishes between the people in the local area. The art also includes animals and other ceremonial meanings. These scenes have been dated to up to 10,000 years old and down to 6,000 years old when painted continuously over time.

Stone points for spears and distinct stone point technology have been found dating from 5–7 thousand years ago in Australia. Many of the early stone point technologies are specifically found in the Kimberley Region of north-western Australia. Spear-launching devices, such as the woomera are believed to have entered widespread use at around this time.

=== Africa ===
North to latitude 15° North of the Equator:

- It is estimated that the beginning of the Pastoral Neolithic was in the later phase of the Green Sahara, in the 6th or 5th millennium BC. It was prior to the end of the African humid period (c. 3500 BC) and the desiccation of the Green Sahara. During this time, sub-Saharan Africa remained in the Palaeolithic. As the grasslands of the Sahara began drying after c. 4000 BC, herders moved into the Nile Valley and by the middle of the 3rd millennium BC into eastern Africa.
- The earliest-known permanent settlement in Egypt, situated at the southwestern edge of the Nile Delta (near Merimde Beni Salama), dates to approximately 4750 BCE—possibly composed of as many as 16,000 residents.Merimde culture flourishes in Lower Egypt (circa 5000–4200 BC).
- Upper Egypt experiences new phase of sedentarism from prior nomadic lifestyles (circa 5000 BC). During the fifth millennium BC, migrations from the drying Sahara brought neolithic people into the Nile Valley along with agriculture, see History of Sudan.
- Predynastic Egyptians of the 5th millennium BC pictorially represented geometric designs, with further development of mathematics, alchemy and astronomy within the polities of Egypt, see Nabta Playa. This is simultaneous with cultural diffusions via the Sahara (African Humid Period). A second wave of intensive construction occurred around 4800 BC where stone circles were aligned with the summer solstice, near the beginning of the rainy season emphasising a virtue of fertility.

More complex structures followed during a second intensive wave onwards from 4500 BC. With alignments with Sirius, Arcturus, Alpha Centauri, and the Belt of Orion. This suggests a great academic pursuit to investigate astronomical observations, cosmology and mathematics. Fifth millennium alignments of stele to bright stars focussed on issues of major practical importance of the era being: cattle, water, death, earth, sun, stars and theology.

- Tasian culture, Badarian culture thrive with trade routes connecting Egypt to Syria, the Sinai and Red Sea. Both share culturally distinctive "black-top ware". Badarian culture expands Southwards towards future Hierakonpolis.
- El Omari culture and Amratian culture forms circa 4000 BC. Cultural distinctions between the two are first observed, however Aramatian influence begins to expand throughout Upper and Middle Egypt, with trade routes of cedar from Byblos to gold and obsidian imported from Nubia representing complex social stratification.
- Diffusion of African Humid Period religions, and cultural traits Eastwards to Egypt via political, social and economical interrelated movements. Southwards migrations result in emergence of the Butana Group circa 4000 BC. Potential time of Osiris figure existing circa 4100 BC to 3900 BC within Egypt.
- Maghreb transitions from the Mesolithic to the Neolithic stage finishing completely circa 5000 BC.
- Early 5th millennium BC, cattle herding, animal husbandry and polities within the Sahara continue to thrive, most notably the Tenerian culture with Eurasian genotype. Eurasian migrations continue onwards in some places from the rapid migrations of the previous millennia into the Sahara, representing a time of great social and economic opportunity.
- Proto-Berber populations migrate Northwards towards Libya resulting in increased population density and diffusion of religion, explained via the Sahara pump theory.
- One subclade, now known as R1b1a2 (R-V88), is found only at high frequencies amongst populations native to West Africa, such as the Fulani, and is believed to reflect a prehistoric back-migration from Eurasia to Africa of peoples related to the ancestors of the Proto-Indo-Europeans and Natufians in the Palaeolithic, with migrations continuing into the Neolithic (circa 5000 BC) to the Chalcolithic of the more ancient, native proto-Berber peoples sometimes intermixed and alongside the Capsian culture deeper into the Sahara. Cultural significant elements are complex theology, red ochre, importation of ovicaprids and dentistry.

Sub-Saharan Africa:

- In the East:Preceded by assumed earlier sites in the Eastern Sahara, tumuli with megalithic monuments developed as early as 4700 BC in the Saharan region of Niger with complex theological work and social stratification present, potentially interconnected with the theological and astronomical advancements in Egypt.
- Dotted wavy line and wavy line pottery is traded across North and Eastern Africa by the various cultures. These pieces are some of the oldest examples of pottery, made by Eurasian descended hunter-fisher-gatherers in a tradition that lasted. 5000 years since the 9th millennium BC.
- Although constituent groups and genetic of Nilo-Saharan predate the African neolithic by thousands of years. A unity of Eastern Sudanic occurs among socially stratified cultures in the 5th millennium BC. These cultures although experiencing trade with Afro-Asiatic stratified Cushitic agrarian cultures, experience migrations and cultural diffusion across the Sahara Westwards, North and Eastwards themselves.
- East Between 7500 BCE and 3500 BCE, amid the Green Sahara, undomesticated central Saharan flora were farmed, stored, and cooked, and domesticated animals (e.g., Barbary sheep) were milked and managed in Libya.
- In West Africa: the Pastoral Period spanned from the savanna region to the eastern Saharan region, and from Mauritania to the Red Sea, which extensive trade between the regions and polities. Agriculture is introduced and advanced within West Africa by Eurasian descended populations alongside sub saharan populations.
- West:Venus figurine importations into sub saharan Africa via Eurasian descended pastoralists with the emergence of complexly organized pastoral societies in West Africa between 4000 BCE and 1000 BCE, representative of a priest class with diffused religion from the Fertile Crescent. Though possibly developed as early as 5000 BCE, Nsibidi may have also developed in 2000 BCE, as evidenced by depictions of the West African script on Ikom monoliths at Ikom, in Nigeria.
- Central to West:Populations and tribes spreading the Niger–Congo languages migrate with long distance trade routes and large chiefdoms between Eastern West Africa and their homeland of Central Africa millennia before. This expansion of this set of the Niger-Congo languages may have been associated with the expansion of Sahel agriculture in the African Neolithic period, following the desiccation of the Sahara in c. 3500 BCE and segregation of the Eurasian descended Paleolithic and Neolithic peoples into West, East and North Africa, by the Sahara desert. This contemporary expansion of the Niger–Congo languages preceded the later, more famous, Bantu expansion.
- The final period (4500–4000 BC) of the Round Head Period; Negroid hunter-gatherers, who created the Round Head rock art, adopted the culture of cattle pastoralism from incoming cattle pastoralists.
- South: Red finger-painted rock art created between 4000 BC, and 200 AD, to the south of Kei River and Orange River by Khoisan hunter-gatherer-herders, in Malawi and Zambia by dark-skinned, occasionally bearded, bow-and-arrow-wielding Akafula hunter-gatherers who resided in Malawi until the 19th century CE, and in Transvaal by the Vhangona people. Khoisan cultures continue from prior millennia to dominate Southern Africa.
- Circa 4500 BC, Proto-Bantu chiefdoms near the Sanaga and Nyong rivers of Southern Cameroon expanded Eastwards from Proto-Southern Bantoid chiefdoms who in an earlier Bantu expansion had expanded into the south and east, engaging the Palaeolithic tribes of the Congo. Such social stratification and rapid political emergence via expansion gives us a depiction of the cultural complexity of these cultures.
- It was formerly thought that proto-Bantu originated somewhere in the border region between Nigeria and Cameroon. However, new research revealed that was more likely the original area of Proto-Southern Bantoid, before it spread southwards into Cameroon long before Proto-Bantu emerged.

=== North America ===
- 4130 BC: Toggling harpoons are invented somewhere in eastern Siberia, spreading south via trade into Japan and east into North America, where they are ancestral to the sophisticated designs of the Inuit and later European whalers.
- 4000–2000 BC: The Dene-Yeniseian languages split into Na-Dene in North America and Yeniseian languages in Siberia. The connection is commonly thought to have been the result of a back-migration of early American Indians in Beringia back into Siberia, forming the Yeniseian peoples that were once widespread throughout Eurasia.
- Across the Southeastern Woodlands, starting around 4000 BC, people exploited wetland resources, creating large shell middens.
- Old Copper culture thrives in Oronto northeastern Wisconsin.
- Native Americans in the northern Great Lakes produce copper tools, ornaments, and utensils traded throughout the Great Plains and Ohio Valley representing a high level of social stratification.
- Emergence of the Shield Archaic tradition circa 4500 BC.
- Around 5000 BC, Holocene glacial runoff affects the Southwest and notably the Colorado Plateau with stronger storm patterns result in significant rates of soil erosion. Precursors to the migrations of the Ancestral Puebloans lived through this climatic shift in tribes and chiefdoms in the Archaic–Early Basketmaker period, with cultural and trade connections to the early Cochise cultures. Despite nomadic lifestyles in hunting seasons continuing early on from the 6th millennium BC these cultures also had settlements with store houses. The Cochise culture begins circa 5000 BC alongside the San Dieguito cultures.
- Shell ornaments and copper items at Indian Knoll in Kentucky evidence an extensive trade system over several millennia across North America.
- During this millennium astronomical and theological work continues to develop. Such examples synonymous with the yearly cycle and gift of maize production is the origins of the Green Corn Ceremony.
- The Tehuacán culture (5000 BC-2300 BC) were likely Proto-Otomanguean speakers that inhabited the area of the Tehuacán valley during the 5th millennium BC.
- Some estimates using the controversial method of glottochronology suggest an approximate splitting date of the Proto-Otomanguean languages at c. 4400 BC.[14] This makes the Oto-Manguean family the language family of the Americas with the deepest time depth, as well as the oldest language family with evidence of tonal contrast in the proto-language.
- Cultures of Mesoamerica advance their cultivation of maize further with an introduction of maize (corn) into the inter-Andean valleys of Colombia in this millennia sometimes via highways. Meanwhile, Peruvian cultures continue to advance cultivation of beans and squash circa 4000 BC. Forest clearing is present especially on the Gulf Coast, with the cultures of Mesoamerica, with social stratification present, workshops, stone settlements, paved roads and an extensive obsidian trade, see Archaic period in Mesoamerica and Gheo-shih. Despite sedentary cultures present within Mexico, typically coastal, nomadic cultures also remain with seasonal occupation, but agriculture yearly and store pits for meats i.e., El Gigante, Honduras.

=== The Caribbean ===
- Trinidad continues from the 6th to 5th millennium onwards to hold the Ortoiroid archaeological tradition, being the first part of the Caribbean to be settled prior to 3500 BC.
- Some of the earliest known villages appear along sea coasts, specifically the Chiapas and Caribbean coasts.It is likely that the abundant sea and lagoon resources could easily support long-term, via sea travel and year-round settlements, leading people to settle first in these areas.

Shell mounds in these areas are highly visible, which likely aided in their identification by scholars. Examples like Cerro de las Conchas, which dates between 5500 and 3500BC appearing to have been a sea resource collection and processing site. While it seems Cerro de las Conchas was only occupied seasonally, it seems likely that inland base camps were occupied year-round.

=== South America ===
- Significant occupation of the Colombian Caribbean coast by polities encompassing sedentary populations has been documented to have occurred by c. 4000 BC.
- The advanced Mexican agriculturalist culture and polities expanded and developed their agricultural practices for millennia now, alongside their Southern intensive trading networks and preistlt rites of fertility brought maize, an ingredient vital for urban civilization was brought to South America. Muisca origins circa 5000 BC in Soacha Tequendama Falls, and through their interrelated expansion Northwards, intensive maize production and permanent settlements are formed distinguishing them from tribes and other polities. Potentially they carried with them major constituent groups of the proto-Chibchan language. This is where legendary hero Bochica is said to have once lived.
- Alongside the Muisca, the Tairona, located in present-day Colombia also began to shift towards long term permanent settlements with agriculture. This shift for these two groups, gives them population advantages over other groups.
- The Amazon rainforest with earlier sourced agricultural polities, experiences migrations and colonisation of these now more advanced agriculturalist chiefdoms with their permanent settlements. Conflicts with native tribes in more remote regions would have arose. Rather than being a pristine wilderness, has been shaped by man for at least 11,000 years through practices such as forest gardening, development of terra mulata soils for fertility, construction of highways, trade routes and large complex chiefdoms.
- ancient sites was a major trading hub in Peru (Paredones and Huaca Prieta) In connection to the trading networks to Mexico, maize was farmed here, as early as 4700 BCE, representing networks of trade and agricultural selective breeding, spanning over millennia. Peoples living in complex sedentary structures, along the coast of northern Peru were already eating corn by that time.
- Peruvian advances this side of the world, in domestication of llamas and alpacas since at least 6000 BC. For the transportation of goods and dung for fertiliser, increases economic growth and agricultural yield when undertaken, thus making this process vital for civilization. This is representative of economic specialisation. Settlements grow all over Peru, significant technological advancements are achieved. Evidence of architectural classes, labour force and social stratification again is noticeable in the Zaña Valley where from 4700 BC these canals drew and transported water from springs in the Andes mountains region for immense agriculture. Use of the canals ended circa 4500 BC, representing periodic social declines and conflict between polities.
- Clothing alongside social stratification is demonstrable in Peru. 6000-year-old dyed cotton fabric was discovered at the Preceramic site of Huaca Prieta. This marks the earliest recorded use of cotton worldwide. Gossypium barbadense and was domesticated by the cultures in the region. Indigo dye was used for selective clothes, representative of higher classes and economic specialisation. Priest-like roles dedicated to astronomical study and observational seasonal change in relation to Peruvian society's reliance on agriculture were present.
- Las Vegas culture holds large scale sedentary structures and coastal adaptation with inheritance of agricultural practices from millennia before alongside newly maize production. Experiences a sudden collapse (circa 4600 BC) resulting in a 1000-year gap within the local archaeological record. Maize production originates from Mexico, but within this millennium continues to rapidly spread all over South America further South, reflecting strong trade routes, diffusions of ideas and culture and social networks.
- Lauricocha II: 6000 – 4200 BC (Andean preceramic IV) ends.

Lauricocha III: 4200 – 2500 BC (Andean preceramic V) begins. Chiefdoms and fish gatherer-hunter societies dominate. Lauricocha was one of the important mountain encampments at the time.

- Neolithic period disappears in Argentina circa 4000 bc due to an extensive dry period that would go on to last 2000 years. This may account for racial distinctions between Patagonia whose hunter-gatherer populations remained in the South, and the rest of Argentina.

== Calendars and chronology ==
The 5th millennium has become a start point for calendars and chronologies. The year 4750 BC is the retrospective startpoint for the Assyrian calendar, marking the traditional date for the foundation of Assur, some 2,000 years before it actually happened.

Another traditional date is 19 July 4241 BC, marking the supposed beginning of the Egyptian calendar, as calculated retrospectively by Eduard Meyer. The more likely startpoint is 19 July 2781 BC, one Sothic cycle later. It has generally been believed that the calendar was based on a heliacal (dawn) rising of Sirius but that view is now being questioned.

According to the Ussher chronology, the creation of Earth happened on 22/23 October 4004 BC. This chronology was the work of James Ussher, whose basis was the dates in the Old Testament of the Bible. He estimated that the universe was created by God at either 18:00 on the 22nd (Jewish calendar) or 09:00 on the 23rd (Ussher-Lightfoot-Chronology).

Yet another calendar starting date in the 5th millennium is Monday, 1 January 4713 BC, the beginning of the current Julian Period, first described by Joseph Justus Scaliger in the sixteenth century. This Julian Period lasts 7,980 years until the year 3268 (current era) in the next millennium. It is a useful device for date conversions between different calendars. The date of origin has the integer value of zero in the Julian Day Count: i.e., in the Julian Calendar; the equivalent date in the Gregorian Calendar is 24 November 4714 BC.

== See also ==
- Northgrippian
