= 8th millennium BC =

Millennium between 8000 BC and 7001 BC

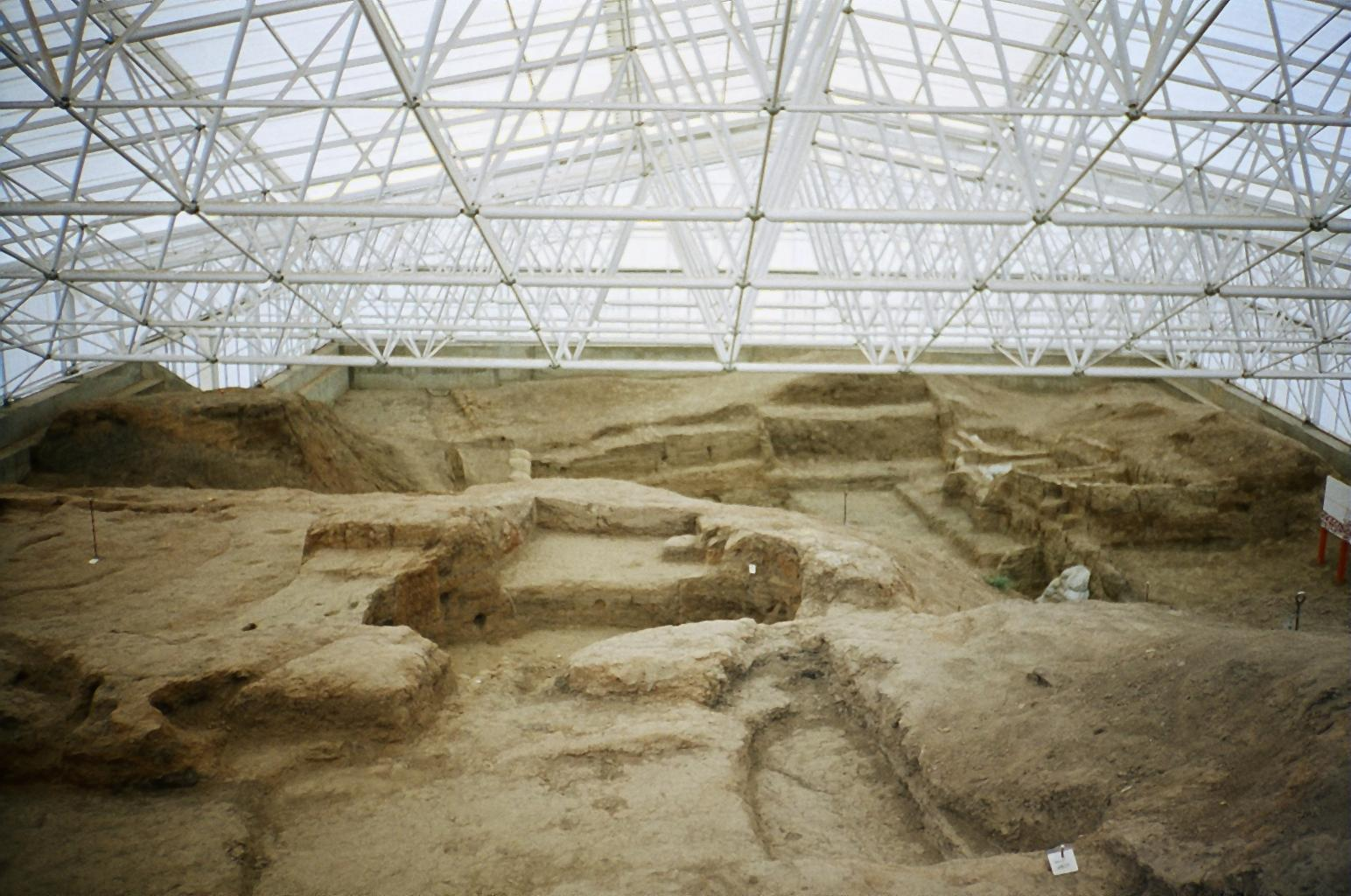
The south area of Çatalhöyük. An archaeological dig is in progress.

Area of the Fertile Crescent, circa 7500 BC, with main sites.

The 8th millennium BC spanned the years 8000 BC to 7001 BC (c. 10 ka to c. 9 ka). In chronological terms, it is the second full millennium of the current Holocene epoch and is entirely within the Pre-Pottery Neolithic B (PPNB) phase of the Early Neolithic. It is impossible to precisely date events that happened around the time of this millennium and all dates mentioned here are estimates mostly based on geological and anthropological analysis, or by radiometric dating.

== Global environment ==
In the geologic time scale, the first stratigraphic stage of the Holocene epoch is the "Greenlandian" from about 9700 BC to the fixed date 6236 BC and so including the whole of the 8th millennium. The Greenlandian followed the Younger Dryas and essentially featured a climate shift from near-glacial to interglacial, causing glaciers to retreat and sea levels to rise. Towards the end of the 8th millennium, the Holocene Climate Optimum (HCO) – also called the Holocene Thermal Maximum (HTM) – began as a warm period lasting roughly 4,000 years until about 3000 BC. Insolation during summers in the northern hemisphere was unusually strong with pronounced warming in the higher latitudes such as Greenland, northern Canada and northern Europe with a resultant reduction in Arctic sea ice.

During the 8th millennium, there were four known volcanic eruptions that registered magnitude 5 above on the Volcanic Explosivity Index (VEI). These were at Rotoma Caldera in New Zealand's Taupō Volcanic Zone about 7560 BC; Lvinaya Past in the Kuril Islands about 7480 BC; Pinatubo on the island of Luzon in the Philippines about 7460 BC; Fisher Caldera, and on Unimak Island in the Aleutians about 7420 BC The biggest eruption was at Fisher Caldera, VEI 6, producing more than 50 km^{3} (12 cu mi) of tephra.

The date of c. 7640 BC has been theorised for the impact of Tollmann's hypothetical bolide with Earth. The hypothesis holds that there was a resultant global cataclysm such as the legendary Universal Deluge. Bolides are asteroids or comets.

According to radiometric dates, the main occupation phases recognized at Shillourokambos took place between the end of the 9th millennium BC and the end of this millennium, long before the Khirokitia Culture. The fact remains that its disappearance in the Middle Phase at Shillourokambos, in the second half of this millennium, is not an isolated incident but one of a number of expressions of a deep cultural change.

== Population and communities ==
Outside the Near East, most people around the world still lived in scattered hunter-gatherer communities that remained firmly in the Palaeolithic. Within the Near East, Neolithic culture and technology had become established throughout much of the Fertile Crescent by 8000 BC and was gradually spreading westward, though it is not believed to have reached Europe till about the end of this millennium. Planting and harvesting techniques were transferred through Asia Minor and across the Aegean Sea to Greece and the Balkans. The techniques were, in the main, cultivation of wheats and barleys; and domestication of sheep, goats and cattle.

The world population was probably stable and slowly increasing. It has been estimated that there were some five million people c. 10,000 BC growing to forty million by 5000 BC and 100 million by 1600 BC. That is an average growth rate of 0.027% p.a. from the beginning of the Neolithic to the Middle Bronze Age.

== Fertile Crescent ==
By c. 7500 BC (see map above right), important sites in or near the Fertile Crescent included Jericho, 'Ain Ghazal, Huleh, Tell Aswad, Tell Abu Hureyra, Tell Qaramel, Tell Mureibit, Jerf el Ahmar, Göbekli Tepe, Nevalı Çori, Hacilar, Çatalhöyük, Hallan Çemi Tepesi, Çayönü Tepesi, Shanidar, Jarmo, Zrebar, Ganj Dareh and Ali Kosh. Jericho in the Jordan Valley continued to be the world's most significant site through this millennium. Çatalhöyük (see image) was a large Neolithic and Chalcolithic proto-city settlement in southern Anatolia that flourished from c. 7500 BC until it was abandoned c. 5700 BC.

== Pottery and dating systems ==
Rudimentary clay vessels were hand-built, often by means of coiling, as the potter's wheel had yet to be invented. Vessels were then pit fired. Dame Kathleen Kenyon was the principal archaeologist at Tell es-Sultan (ancient Jericho) and she discovered that there was no pottery there. The vessels she found were made from stone and she reasonably surmised that others made from wood or vegetable fibres would have long since decayed. The first chronological pottery system had been devised by Sir Arthur Evans for his Bronze Age findings at Knossos and Kenyon used this as a benchmark for the Near East Neolithic. She divided the period into phases called Pre-Pottery Neolithic A (PPNA), from c. 10,000 BC to c. 8800 BC; Pre-Pottery Neolithic B (PPNB), which includes the entire 8th millennium, from c. 8800 BC to c. 6500 BC; and then Pottery Neolithic (PN), which had varied start-points from c. 6500 BC until the beginnings of the Bronze Age towards the end of the 4th millennium (c. 3000 BC).

== Agriculture in the Americas ==
It was from c. 8000 BC that agriculture developed throughout the Americas, especially in modern Mexico. There were numerous New World crops, as they are now termed, and domestication began with the potato and the cucurbita (squash) about this time. Other crops began to be harvested over the next 7,500 years including chili peppers, maize, peanut, avocado, beans, cotton, sunflower, cocoa and tomato.

== Other cultural developments ==
The Mount Sandel Mesolithic site in Ireland is dated to c. 7900–7600 BC. This was long thought to be the earliest human activity on the island, until the discovery of the Alice and Gwendoline Cave pushed the date back to 10,000 BC.

The date for construction of a round-house near Howick, Northumberland is calculated c. 7600 BC by radiocarbon dating. The site is believed to have been occupied for about 100 years.

The Homo sapiens fossil from Combe-Capelle in southern France, discovered in 1909, is estimated to be 9,500 years old (c. 7500 BC).

== Bibliography ==
- Bellwood, Peter (30 November 2004). First Farmers: The Origins of Agricultural Societies. Wiley-Blackwell. p. 384. ISBN 978-06-31205-66-1.
- Bronowski, Jacob (1973). The Ascent of Man. London: BBC. ISBN 978-18-49901-15-4.
- Mithen, Steven (2003). After The Ice. London: Weidenfeld & Nicolson. ISBN 978-07-53813-92-8.
- Roberts, J. M. (1993). Shorter Illustrated History of the World. Abingdon: Helicon Publishing Ltd. ISBN 978-01-95115-04-8.
