= Peter Woodman =

Irish archaeologist

- Born: 2 July 1943
- Died: 24 January 2017 (aged 73)
- Education: Queen's University of Belfast
- Known for: Excavations at Mount Sandel, Newferry and Ferriter's Cove
- Awards: Europa prize, 2009
- Scientific career
- Fields: Archaeology of Ireland; Prehistoric archaeology
- Workplaces: Ulster Museum; University College Cork

Peter Woodman FSA MRIA (2 July 1943 – 24 January 2017) was an Irish archaeologist specialising in the Mesolithic period in Ireland. He was a professor emeritus at University College Cork and a former keeper of the Ulster Museum.

== Education and career ==
Woodman grew up in Holywood, County Down and studied archaeology at Queen's University Belfast. After obtaining his doctorate, he became the Assistant Keeper of Prehistoric Antiquities at the Ulster Museum. In the 1970s he excavated Mesolithic sites at Mount Sandel, the oldest known site of human occupation in Ireland, and Newferry in County Antrim.

He became a professor at University College Cork in 1983, where he continued his research into the Mesolithic period, discovering some of the first evidence of the Mesolithic from the Republic of Ireland at Ferriter’s Cove on the Dingle Peninsula. After retiring, he published Ireland’s First Settlers: Time and the Mesolithic, bringing together fifty years of research into the Irish Mesolithic.

Woodman was elected a Fellow of the Society of Antiquaries of London in 1982. He was awarded the Europa Prize by the Prehistoric Society in 2009, recognising outstanding contributions to the study of European prehistory. In the same year, the Prehistoric Society organised a conference and published a festschrift in his honour. Following Woodman's death in January 2017, James Mallory described him as QUB's "most illustrious archaeology graduate", whose work provided the "basic structure of all subsequent research into the Irish Mesolithic".
