= Mount Sandel Fort =

Coordinates: 55.116°N 6.664°W

Mount Sandel Fort is an Iron Age fort in Coleraine, County Londonderry, Northern Ireland. The remains of the fort are located close to the Mount Sandel Mesolithic site. Mount Sandel Fort mound is a State Care Historic Monument in the townland of Mount Sandel, in Causeway Coast and Glens Borough Council area, at Grid Ref: C8530 3070.

== 12th century ==
The fort was used as a residence of John de Courcy.

== See also ==
- Mount Sandel Mesolithic site
