= Gheo-shih =

Coordinates: 16.9508°N 96.4211°W

Gheo-shih (5000 BC – 3000 BC), which translates to “River of the Gourd Trees” in the Zapotec language, is an open-air site found in the Oaxaca Valley that holds what is considered as the earliest representation of civic-ceremonial architecture. Within this site is a cleared area lined by boulders that is thought to have been used for rituals, dances or athletic competitions. This site could have held 25-30 people and is believed to be a congregation site for microbands during the rainy seasons of the Archaic period.

== Geography ==
Gheo-Shih is located in the Oaxaca Valley, which is in the Southwestern highlands of present-day Mexico. The site is roughly 100 by 150 m (about 1.5 ha), and has an elevation of 1,660 m. During the rainy season (June through September) there was an abundance of mesquite pods and fruit as well as planted squash and gourds.

== Archaeological History ==
Excavation of Gheo-shih began in 1967 through the University of Michigan, the lead archaeologists were Frank Hole and husband and wife team Kent Flannery and Joyce Marcus. Original excavation found two stratigraphic components, the uppermost being dated to 5000-4000 BC and the lower portion being dated to roughly 7000 BC.

Excavation of the lower section uncovered the most prominent feature of the site, a set of parallel lines of boulders 7 by 20 m in size, this cleared area was almost completely devoid of artifacts. Although there are many theories of what this area may have been used for, the most commonly accepted are those of Flannery and Marcus. In correlation with the understanding of the social structure and culture of micro/macrobands Flannery and Marcus believe that this open area was used for rituals, dances and possibly athletic competitions. This theory correlates with the understanding that macroband rituals of the Archaic period were “ad hoc,” meaning that they were not associated with dates or times but performed when there was the largest number of people possibly present.

Also found at this site were metate and mano (stone) fragments, atlatl points as well as areas of lapidary work with pebbles and chipped stone manufacturing. There were also oval rings of stone that are believed to be the remnants of walls from residential structures. All of these finds were found around the cleared area.

The dates for this site were found using Carbon-14 dating on two pieces of charcoal, most likely burnt twigs, found in the lower stratified portion. The dates associated with these pieces are 7630-7570 BC and 7720-7560 BC.

== Cultural significance ==
=== Social Structure ===
Gheo-shih is thought to have been occupied during the Archaic period when bands and microbands were prominent. Archaeologists think that at this time family-sized microbands spent lean seasons apart from each other and then came together at larger sites during abundant seasons to form macrobands. Because of archaeological evidence such as abundant food sources and evidence of nonsubsistence actives such as lapidary work, Gheo-shih is thought to be one of these larger sites occupied by macrobands. It is also believed that when these macrobands were formed “ad hoc” rituals and/or athletic competitions would be performed because the maximum number of people would be present. This explains the common theories behind Gheo-shih's main feature, the boulder lined cleared area.

=== Lapidary Work ===
There is archaeological evidence of lapidary work at Gheo-shih. Small pebbles with carved holes in them have been found and it is believed that these were mainly decorative ornaments. This find is significant as it shows that the people living there had the time and manpower to devote to nonsubsistence related activities. This as well supports the macroband theory.

== Controversy ==
There is some controversy surrounding Gheo-shih in the field of archaeology. Some archaeologists disagree with Flannery and Marcus' theories about the boulder lined cleared area found there. Many argue that the rocks could have moved over time, or that with many time periods represented in one place it is hard to distinguish between them. Archaeologist Marcus Winter from the Mexican National Institute of Anthropology and History in Oaxaca believes that the boulders may in fact be a road built in the Spanish colonial times. Marcus argues in response that there are no other artifacts from the colonial times found at that site and that there is distinct stratigraphy to demarcate time periods.
