= Ferriter's Cove =

Bay in County Kerry, Ireland

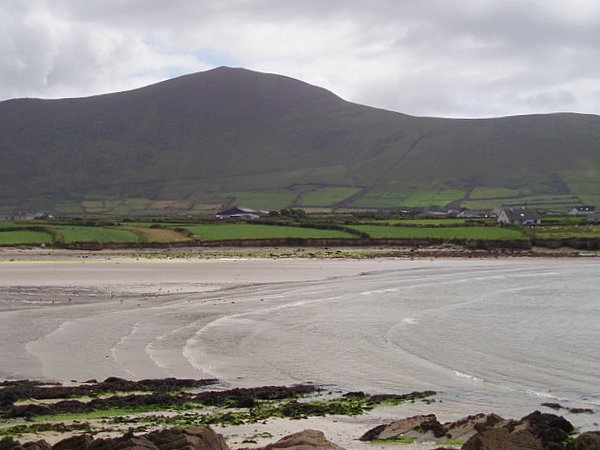
- Ferriter's Cove

- Location in Ireland
- Location: County Kerry, Munster, Ireland
- Coordinates: 52.171°N 10.447°W
- Type: Cove
- Part of: Atlantic Ocean

Ferriter's Cove (Irish: Cuan an Chaoil) is a small bay located at the westernmost point of Dingle Peninsula, in County Kerry, Ireland. It is in the Dún Urlainn (Dunurlin) parish and electoral division of the Dingle rural area (pop. 438, 2011 census).

== Etymology ==
The cove's English name refers to the Ferriter family, whose name derives from the Norman French le Fereter. Walter le Fereter, the ancestor of many later Ferriters, is the first person known in the area with the name and probably arrived following other Normans from Dublin. He was mentioned twice in a plea roll of 1252. The parish of Dunurlin is also recorded as being in the Ferriter's possession, and the name also exists in the nearby village of Baile 'n Fheirtéaraigh (Ballyferriter).

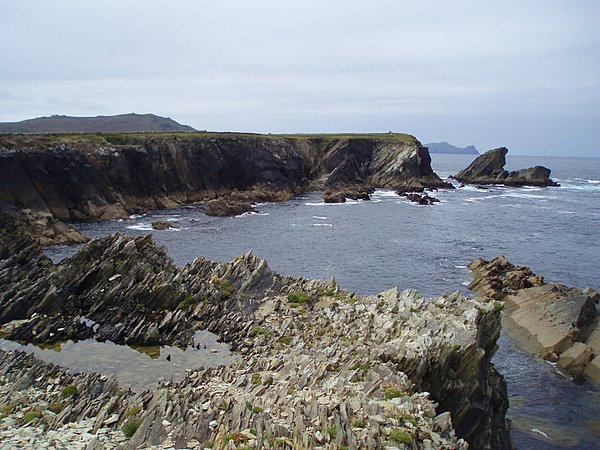
Volcanic Silurian rocks at Ferriter's Cove.

== Geography ==
At the northern limit, the bedrock around the Cove is Devonian (419.2–358.9 mya) in age, beginning with conglomerate sandstone and siltstone of the Pointagare group, then the Ballydavid sandstone formation and further south the medium-grained Farran sandstone formation. Furthest south the igneous Silurian (443.8–419.2 mya) rocks of the Foilnamahagh Formation are dominant, with lavas and pyroclastic remnants.

Between 2009 and 2017 (at Baile 'n Fheirtéaraigh), for January and July respectively, the mean temperatures are 8 °C and 16 °C and the mean rainfall 207 mm and 153 mm; the highest and lowest mean wind speeds were 39.3 km/h (November 2009) and 14.3 km/h (July 2013) respectively, with the highest wind speeds generally in winter.

== Archaeology ==
Excavations performed in the late 20th century have provided evidence that people lived there during the Mesolithic. The excavations at Ferriter's Cove were conducted by Peter C. Woodman. They followed a find in 1983 by an amateur archaeologist of a flint knife, believed to be from the Neolithic period.

Woodman's team found implements that dated the site to the late Mesolithic. These included a grindstone, marked sandstone pebbles, shell dumps, various hearths and five mudstone axes that had been deposited together. The site has been interpreted as following the model of ephemeral Later Mesolithic habitation of short term stays, and the dating suggests that the site was used intermittently over a millennium, with more or less three phases. While Ferriter's Cove contained no formal burials, several pieces of human bone and teeth were found, one dating to 4225–3950 BC, and the other to 4250–3980 BC.

In 2012, further research was published confirming evidence of Neolithic farmers at Ferriter's cove, providing the first evidence of farming in Ireland. The remains of cattle and sheep, the latter not native to Ireland, were investigated; carbon dating showed that they were alive c. 4350 BC. In 2026, investigation of the bones tentatively identified as cattle found them to be bear and wild boar.
