= Alice and Gwendoline Cave =

Limestone formation in County Clare, Ireland

- Uaimh Ailíse agus Gwendoline
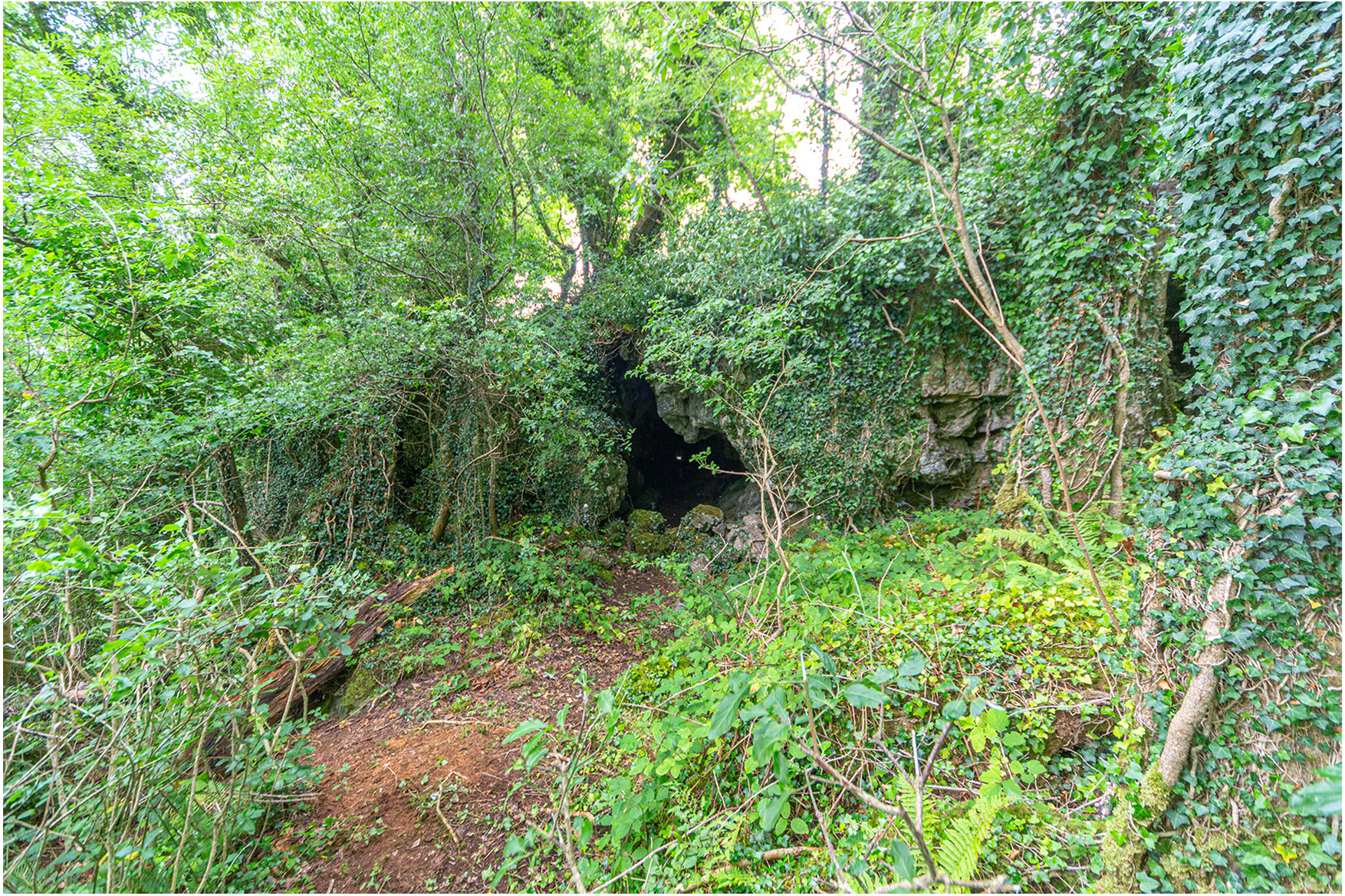
- Exterior of the cave

- Location within Ireland
- Location: Cahircalla, Ennis, County Clare
- OSI/OSNI grid: R 319 745
- Coordinates: 52.817650°N 9.009355°W
- Geology: Limestone
- Cave survey: 1902, 2019

The Alice and Gwendoline Cave is a limestone cave in County Clare, Ireland. It was first investigated by scholars in 1902. In 2016, a bear patella with possible butchery marks found in the cave was dated to the Upper Palaeolithic, which is potentially the oldest known evidence of human habitation in Ireland.

== Location and geology ==
The Alice and Gwendoline Cave is located on the grounds of the 18th-century Edenvale House, about 3.5 kilometres (2.2 mi) southwest of Ennis in Cahircalla townland. It is 260 metres north of Edenvale Lake, within a Lower Carboniferous limestone outcrop. It has two main passages, the Alice Passage and the Gwendoline Passage, and three smaller passages. There are five openings to the cave.

== Archaeology ==
Alice and Gwendoline Cave was first investigated in 1902 at the direction of the Committee Appointed to Explore Irish Caves, a group of academics founded in 1901 with funding from the British Science Association and the Royal Irish Academy. The excavation was directed by Richard J. Ussher, and the standard of excavation was particularly high for the early 20th century. (Note: For detailed analysis of the 1902 excavation's methodology, see Dowd et al. 2021, pp. 7–11.) Ussher was assisted by National Museum of Ireland staff James Duffy and Robert Griffin. Four women, including Alice Jane and Gwendoline Clare Stacpoole—daughters of Alice Julia Stacpoole, the then-resident of Edenvale (Note: Stacpoole was the sister of antiquarian Thomas Johnson Westropp, who was on the investigation team.)—assisted in the excavation as well. Previously called the Bull Paddock Cave, it was renamed for the two Stacpoole daughters following the excavation.

During excavation, between 10,000 and 15,000 animal bone fragments were found, including that of extinct fauna. Ten human bones, two of which have been located, and more than twenty artefacts including stone tools, worked bone objects, two Viking arm-rings, (Note: One was made out of gold and the other copper alloy. The gold arm-ring is rare, and only three other examples have been found in Ireland. The copper alloy arm-ring is unique on the island.) iron nails, and amber beads were recovered. The strata had been disturbed, evidenced by artefacts of different periods being found together. A portion of the thousands of animal bones found in the cave was deposited in the National Museum of Ireland – Natural History in the 1920s.

A human clavicle found in Alice and Gwendoline Cave was radiocarbon-dated in 2007 to 10,146–9,700 cal. BP, making it the earliest directly dated human bone in Ireland. It potentially predates the commonly accepted start date for the Irish Mesolithic and Holocene-era settlement of the island.

=== Bear patella ===
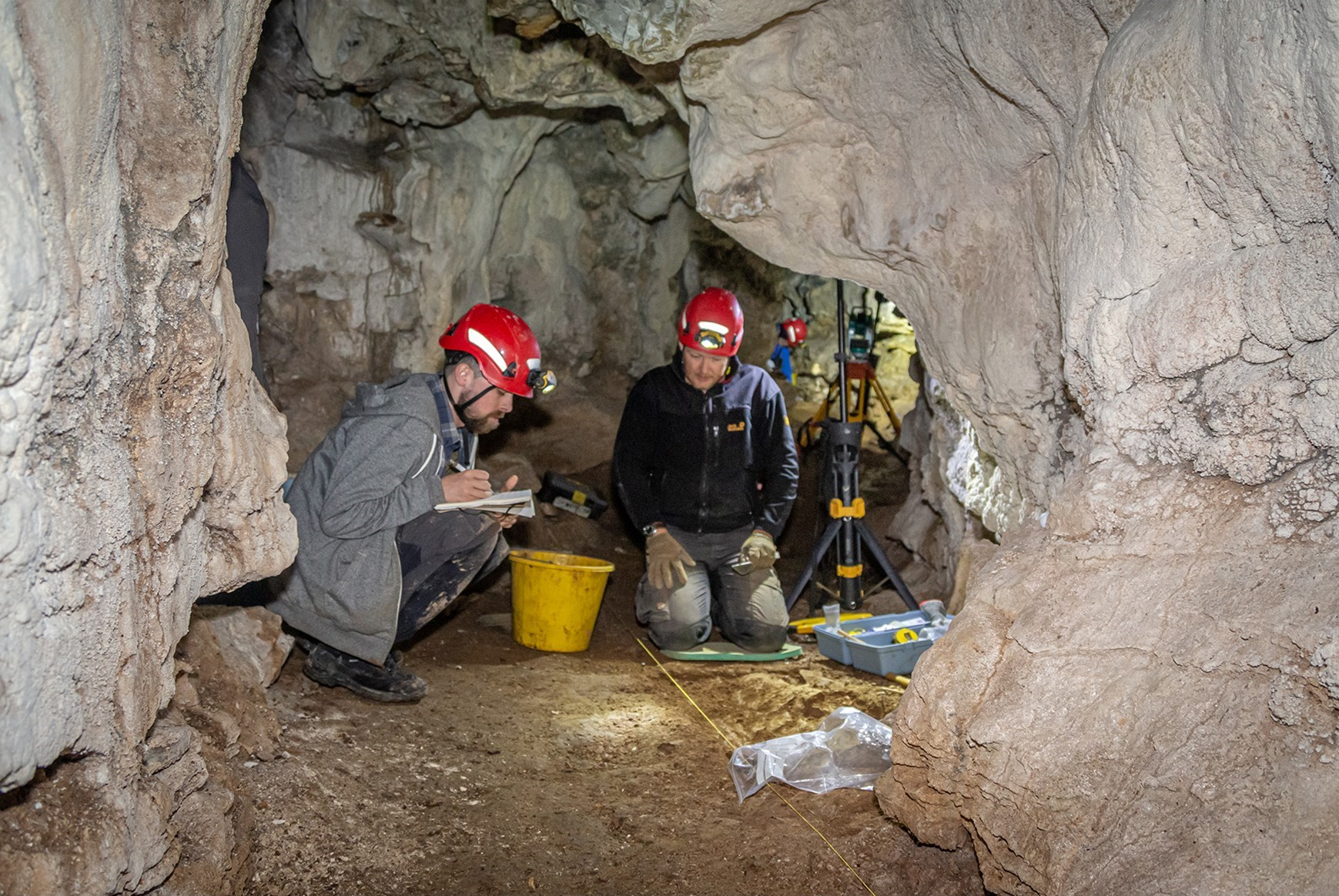
Archaeologists investigating the cave in 2019.

In 2011, animal osteologist Ruth Carden identified a butchered bear patella from Alice and Gwendoline Cave in the National Museum's collection. Bears went extinct in Ireland in the Middle Bronze Age, and evidence of human interaction with bears in Ireland is rare. The bear patella was radiocarbon-dated to 10,860–10,641 cal. BC, which places it in the late Upper Palaeolithic. Due to this unexpectedly early date, a second sample was radiocarbon-dated, which produced similar results. The cut marks were characteristic of having been cut into fresh bone with a flint tool, perhaps for the purpose of removing the tendons from the bear to use as cordage. The patella is not weathered, suggesting it was not transported from elsewhere into the cave. It may indicate settlement activity near the site. No other objects recovered from the cave have been dated to the Palaeolithic, although some undated objects and artefacts are undiagnostic and could potentially be contemporary with the patella. Some artefacts found in 1902, including two scrapers, have since been lost.

According to archaeologist Marion Dowd and Ruth Carden, the bear patella is the first known evidence for human presence in Ireland during the Palaeolithic. Previously, the earliest evidence of human habitation in Ireland was Mount Sandel, a Mesolithic site in Coleraine which dates to c. 9,800–9,600 cal. BP. The dating of the bear patella is within the Younger Dryas, when small groups of humans may have been migrating to Ireland and elsewhere in Northwestern Europe. Archaeologist Graeme Warren has argued that the cooling climate of the Younger Dryas would have made Ireland more inhospitable and therefore that significant human activity is unlikely, but that human exploration from northern Europe is possible. Archaeologist Jesse Tune further argues that human habitation of Ireland would not have been viable until the Holocene, due to the climatic and ecological conditions prior. He also argues that the dating of the cut marks on the patella is uncertain due to the lack of precise geoarchaeological investigation of the cave's sediments and similarly dated artefacts.

=== 2019–2020 investigation ===
From 2019 to 2020, the cave was subject to a 3D digital survey, geophysical surveys, excavation, sedimentary lipid analysis, and new radiocarbon dating. The project confirmed that giant deer, reindeer, and brown bears were present in Ireland simultaneously with the bear patella, and therefore potentially contemporary with human habitation in Ireland during the Late Pleistocene.
