= Prehistoric Ethiopia =

Occurrence and people throughout Ethiopian prehistory

Ethiopia is considered the area from which anatomically modern humans emerged. Archeological discoveries in the country's sites have garnered specific fossil evidence of early human succession, including the hominins Australopithecus afarensis (3.2 million years ago) and Ardipithecus ramidus (4.4 million years ago). Human settlements in present-day Ethiopia began at least in the Late Stone Age, and the agricultural revolution took place in the third millennium BC. Ethnolinguistic groups of Afroasiatic speakers (namely Semitic, Cushitic, and Omotic) and Nilo-Saharan speakers—defined by new ethnic, cultural, and linguistic identities—emerged around 2000–1000 BC.

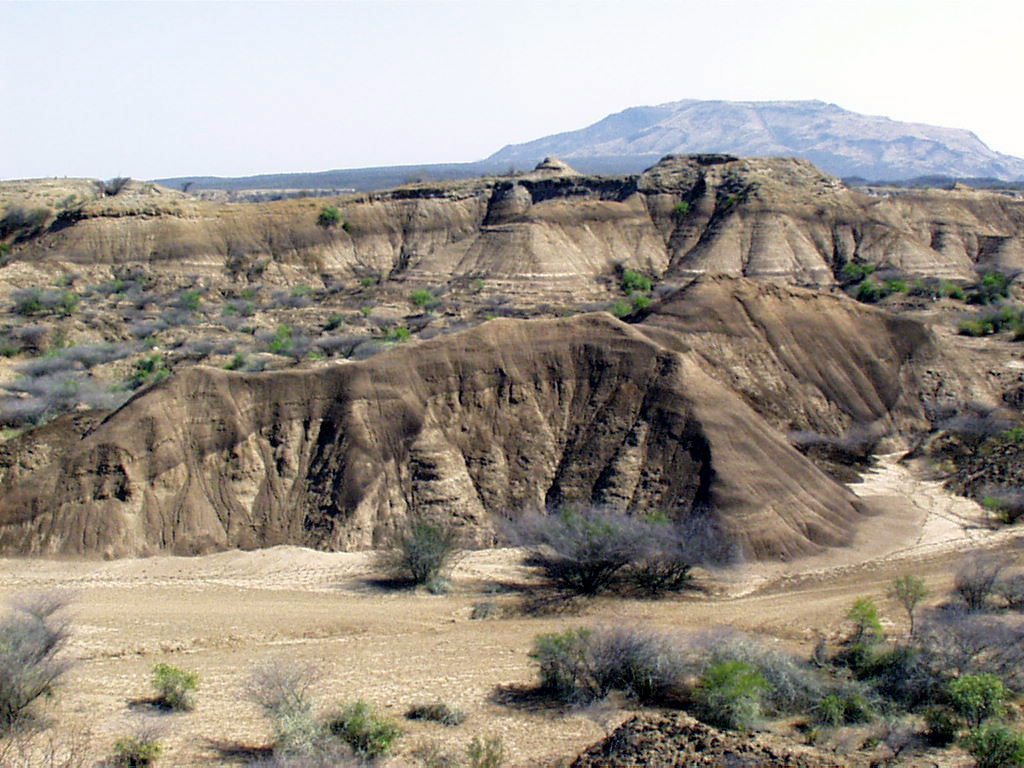
Kibish has the site of oldest fossil of human bones believed to be 195,000 years old along with Omo River. The skull remains are 40,000 older than in Herto, Ethiopia.

== Archeological finds ==
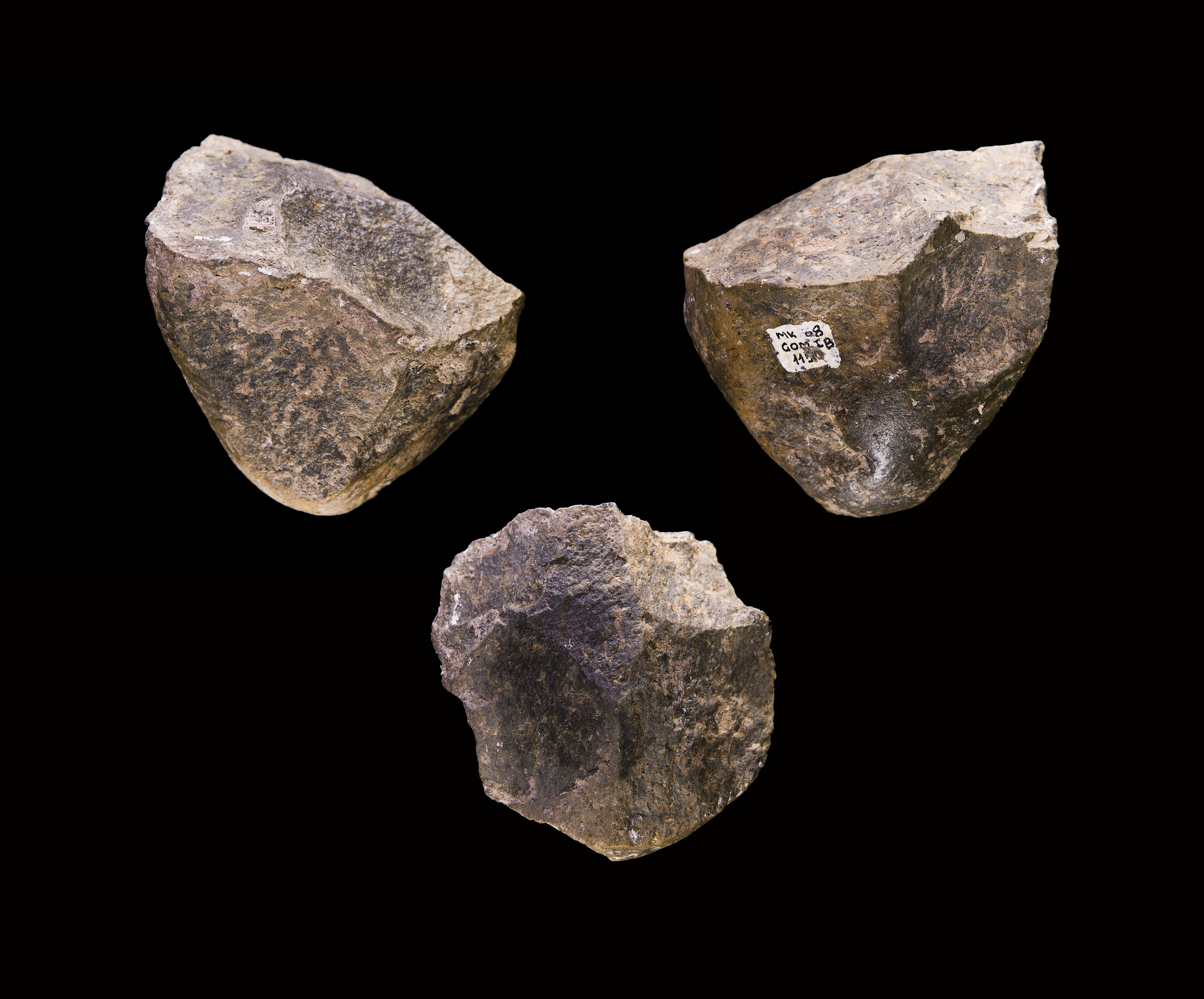
One of the earliest stone tools discovered in Melka Kunture (1.7 myo)

One of the most prominent and precursor excavations in Ethiopia was conducted by Gerard Dekker at the Stone Age site of Melka Kunture in 1963. There, he recognized that the exposed layered rock on the bank of a flood-prone river represented a fossil record dating back 1.7 million years. French paleoanthropologist Jean Chavallion conducted a systematic expedition of the site between 1965 and 1995. Several Homo erectus fossils aged 1.5 million – 1.7 million years have been uncovered at the site, as well as cranial fragments of early Homo sapiens.

Between 1967 and 1974, the Omo remains were excavated in the southwestern Omo Kibish area and have been dated to the Middle Paleolithic, around 200,000 years ago.

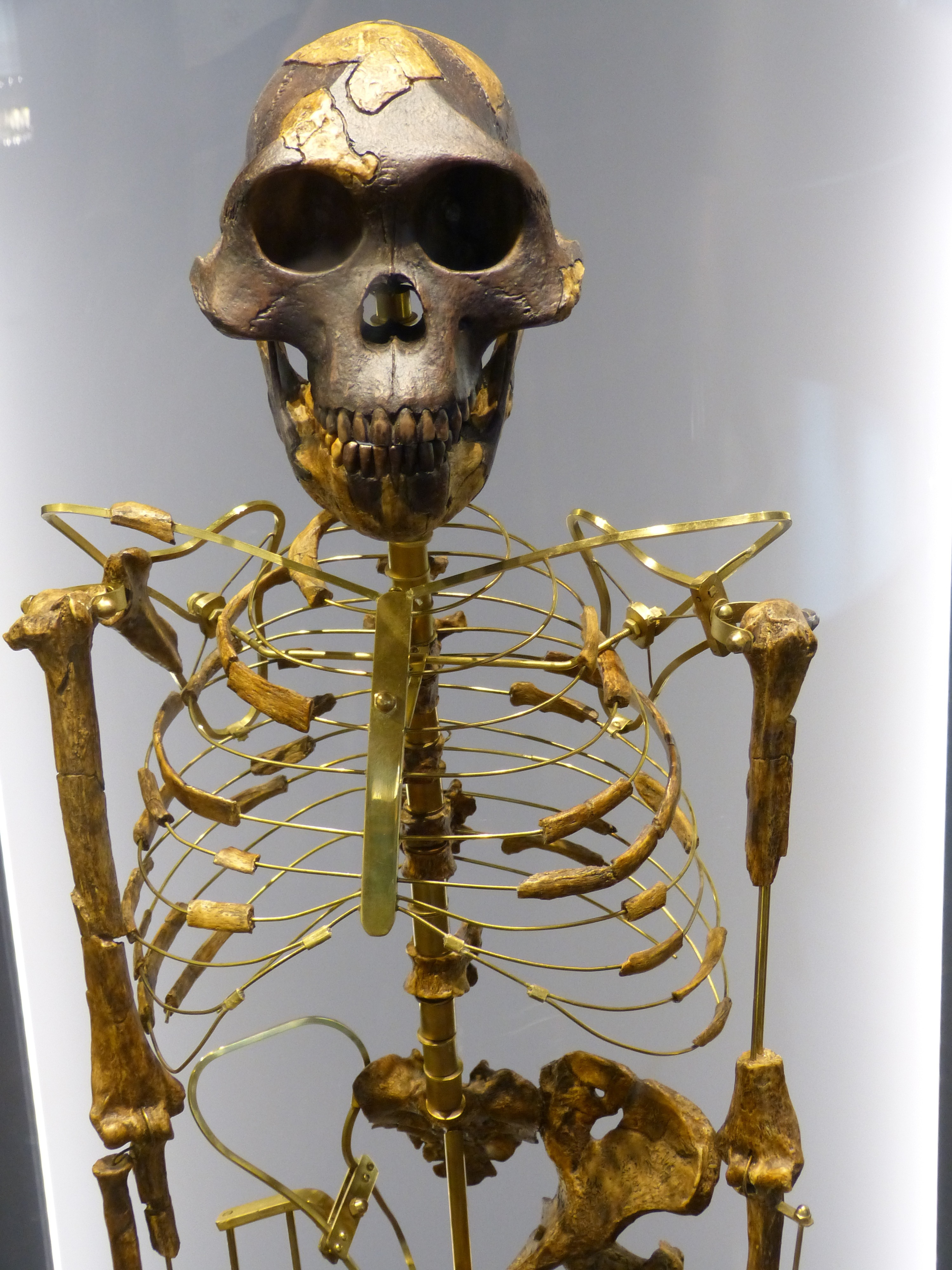
Australopithecus afarensis at National Museum of Ethiopia

In 1974, American paleoanthropologist Donald Johnson excavated a 3.2-million-year-old early female Australopithecus afarensis (nicknamed "Lucy") in Hadar in the Awash Valley. Ethiopians refer to the fossil as "Dinqnesh". Lucy weighed about 60 pounds and stood three and a half feet tall.

Between 1992 and 1994, a team led by paleoanthropologist Tim White discovered the first Ardipithecus ramidus (nicknamed "Ardi") fossil in the Middle Awash area of Ethiopia, dating to 4.4 million years ago. Subsequently, 100 fossil specimens of Ardi were uncovered. These hominins lived in Early Pliocene and were likely omnivores, consuming plants, meat, and fruit but not hard abrasive foods like nuts and tubers. In 2009, scientists formally announced and published their findings on Ardi. Ardi has certain human features—including smaller diamond-shaped canines and some evidence of upright walking—and is said to descend from the predecessor Ardipithecus kadabba, found in the same area.

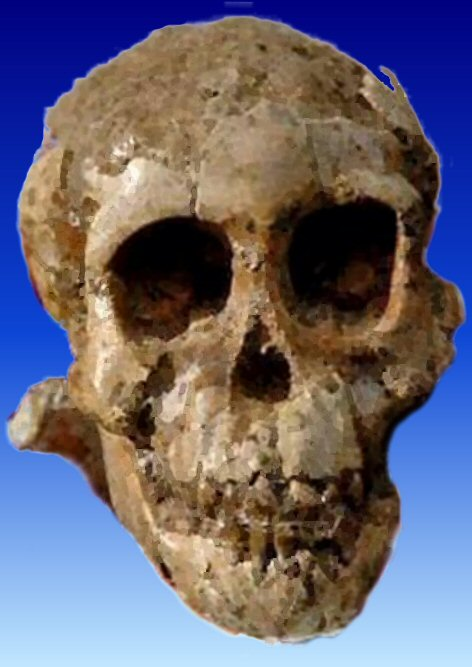
Australopithecus afarensis baby named "Selam", discovered in 2000 (3.3 myo)

In 2000, scientists led by paleoanthropologist Zeresenay Alemseged discovered a veiled 3.3-million-year-old Australopithecus afarensis baby nicknamed "Selam". Searches continued in 2001 when Yohannes Haile-Selassie discovered fossils of a 5.2-million-year-old Ardipithecus ramidus family, 15 mi (24 km) from Aramis. Recently, Yohannes has also found fossil specimens of human ancestors in the Afar Region.

== Human settlements ==
=== Neolithic Revolution ===
During the Late Stone Age in 9000 BC, there were at least two bladelet-making archeological cultures in Greater Ethiopia: the Wilton culture (small stone blades) and the Hargeistan (long obsidian bladelet).

It is unclear whether or not these people transitioned to animal husbandry until their successors. Rock paintings of human and animal figures in Hararghe region and Eritrea illustrate the domestication of cattle and crafting of pottery, hand axes, hoes, and grinding stones. This suggests that by the late third millennium BC, rudimentary agriculture commenced in many parts of western Ethiopia. There is evidence of stone hand tools, blade instruments, and drawings in the limestone caves found in Dire Dawa. Recent findings suggest that crafting was introduced to Ethiopia from Sudan via the Blue Nile Valley.

The early inhabitants of Ethiopia began domesticating grains during the Chalcolithic Age (6200–3000 BC). The development of plough-based agriculture may imply the domestication of cattle around the same time. By the Early Bronze Age (3000 BC), animals such as cattle, sheep, goats, and donkeys were being domesticated.

=== Ethnolinguistic diffusion ===
Detailed map of Afroasiatic languages in Africa and the Middle East

Linguistic analysis indicates that proto-Ethiopians spoke Hamito-Semitic or Afroasiatic languages in the third millennium BC; these languages probably originated from the Eastern Sahara after its desertification. In the 1950s, scholars agreed that only the Afroasiatic language was an ancestor of five major languages: Ancient Egyptian, Berber, Semitic, and Cushitic. Harold Fleming proposed including a sixth language group, Omotic (previously considered a branch of Cushitic), and speculated that the Afroasiatic homeland might be in southwestern Ethiopia.

The split between proto-Cushitic and proto-Omotic began by the fourth or fifth millennium BC, and proto-Semitic separated to Asia Minor. Inconclusive research suggests the Afroasiatic superfamily began to diffuse by 13,000 BC, a period of Omotic slight migration southward. I.M Diakonoff surmised Afroasiatic people in Ethiopia were attributed to North Africa, specifically from the Sahara to the Nile Delta and over the Sinai Peninsula. Gover Hudson hypothesized that proto–Semitic migrated to West Asia across Bab-el-Mandeb into South Arabia. Also, independent linguistic analysis shows the presence of Semitic speakers in Ethiopia in at least 2000 BC. Linguistic and cultural fission of proto-Ethiopians occurred in this period. Proto–Ethiopians are classified into five stable groups:

1. Northern Cushites – known by the ancient Greeks as "Blemmyes" or "Beja", they developed a single dialect cluster called "Bedawie". They lived as nomadic pastoralists in the desert lowland of the Red Sea in northern Ethiopia and Eritrea.
2. Central Cushites – they spoke the dialect cluster "Agaw" and occupied northwestern Ethiopia. Their culture and language are thought to be spoken within an enclave. They are known for the plow cultivation of cereal grains.
3. Eastern Cushites – they lived southwest of the Great Rift Valley. Their dialects of the East Cushitic language were split among two dozen tribes. These people practiced hoe cultivation of cereal grains and tubers, and terraced agriculture advanced for ancient times. They, along with neighboring people in northern Kenya, are known for distinct social organization systems with classes recruited through a fixed cycle of grades and intervals.
4. Semitic speakers of Ethiopia – their origin is generally obscured. By the first millennium BC, the group was split into two branches: the northern plateau region and the central part of the country. The group consists of seven ethnic clusters with varying characteristics (such as size, customs, and lifestyle).
5. Omotic speakers in southwest Ethiopia – they practiced hoe cultivation of cereal grains and tubers, and are known for their ritual monarchy. The Omotic is considered the most diversified society, being divided into fifty subgroups with distinct languages and cultures.

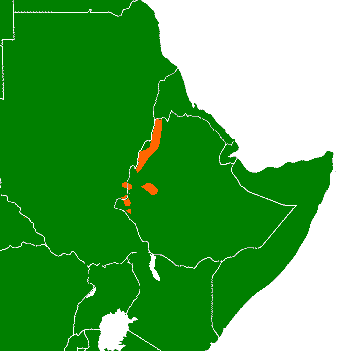
Nilo-Saharan language distribution in today's Ethiopia–Sudan border

The Nilotic peoples of Sudan migrated to Greater Ethiopia in different phases. Pre-Nilotes arrived in Ethiopia about the third millennium BC. They were mostly agriculturalists who developed the cultivation of sorghum and tuberous plants like enset and yams. Today, they are settled in western parts of Ethiopia namely Berta, Gumuz, and Koma. The second phase of Nilotic migration took place in the first millennium BC. They are marked by cattle raising, millet cultivation, and dualistic social organization. Their settlement constitutes the western periphery of Ethiopia. The Nilotic represents two tribes, known as Anyuak and Nuer.
