= Mount Sandel Mesolithic site =

Excavated mesolithic huts in Coleraine, Northern Ireland

Coordinates: 55.1161°N 6.6642°W

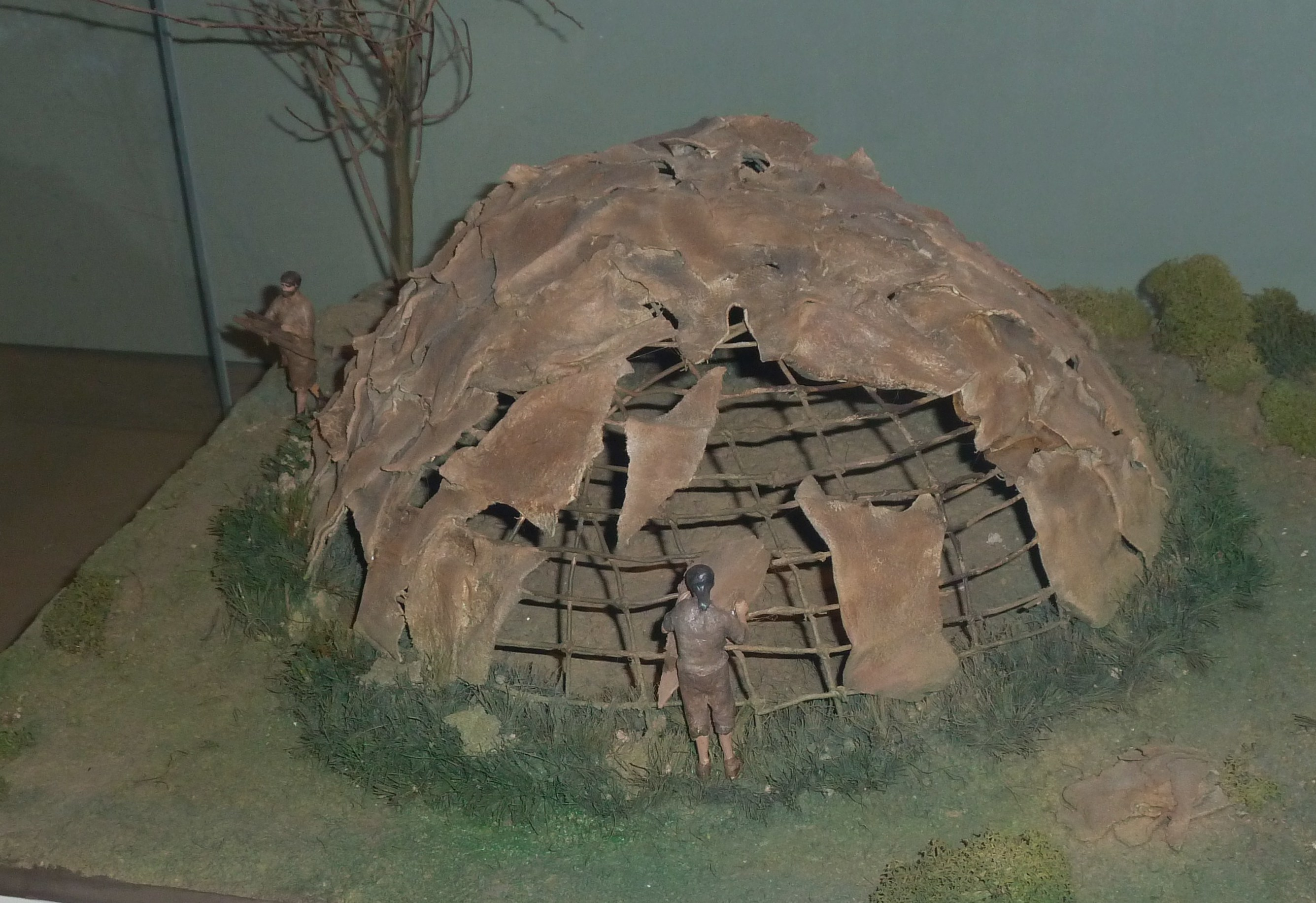
Model of a Mount Sandel hut

The Mount Sandel Mesolithic site is in Coleraine, County Londonderry, Northern Ireland, near the River Bann and just to the east of the Iron Age Mount Sandel Fort. It is one of the oldest archaeological sites in Ireland with carbon dating indicating an age of 9,000 years old (7,000BC). Gwendoline Cave in County Clare is the only site in Ireland with evidence of human occupation that pre-dates this location. Mount Sandel Mesolithic site is a Scheduled Historic Monument in the townland of Mount Sandel, in Causeway Coast and Glens Council area, at Grid Ref: C8533 3076. It was excavated by Peter Woodman in the 1970s.

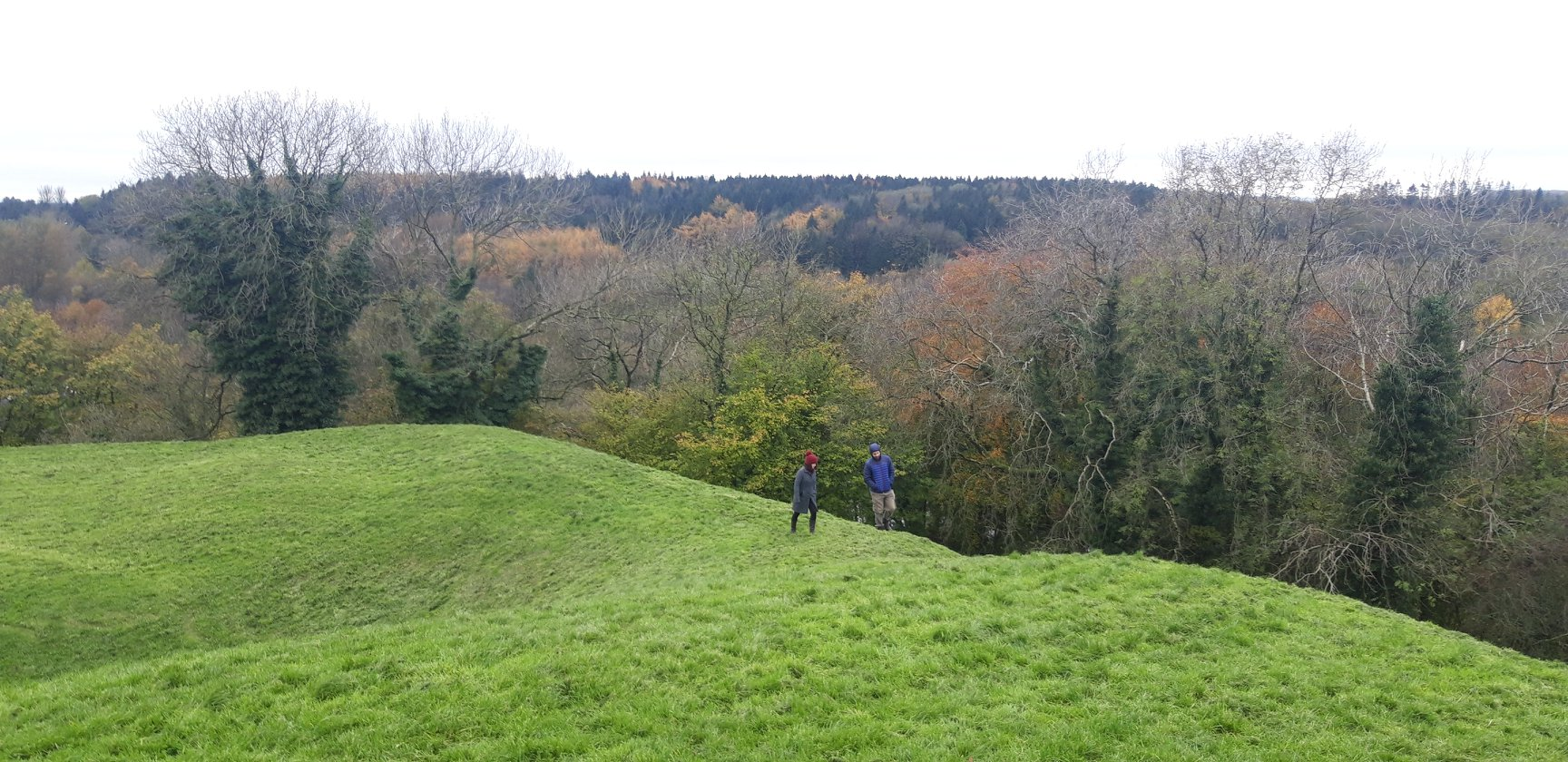
The site in November 2019

It has been said that "The Mt. Sandel excavations dominate the picture of the Early Mesolithic (in Ireland) as so few other sites have been excavated and fully published, let alone found. Not only that, but there was evidence for dwellings – until recently it was not until the Neolithic that there was again evidence for houses in Ireland." These excavations revealed the remains of no fewer than ten structures, although these were not all contemporaneous, and a large number of pits, post-holes and hearths. When the structures could be made out most of them were apparently roughly oval in plan and measured approximately 6 metres (20 ft) in width. They had been built over shallow man-made depressions and were defined by stout post-holes. Many of the post holes were inclined towards the centre of the building which suggests that they were for holding saplings that were bent inwards after being driven into the ground to make a tent or tepee like structure. It is assumed that this framework was then covered in hide, reed, or some other organic material. Within the huts, a hearth was positioned in the centre.

It is thought that this site was most likely home to a small extended family group that occupied this site for most of the year. They were hunter-gatherers catching the migrating salmon during the summer, gathering hazelnuts in the autumn and hunting wild boar in the winter. The hearths and pits contained animal bones including wild pig, salmon, sea bass, eel and flounder. Apple seeds and water lily were also found. Bird remains were from duck, pigeon, grouse, goshawk and wood grouse. Flint picks and two polished axe heads were also found. Internal hearths heated their robust homes and represent the only confirmed Mesolithic houses so far found in Ireland.
