= Artenacian culture =

Prehistoric culture in France

- Geographical range: Nouvelle-Aquitaine
- Period: Late Chalcolithic
- Dates: c. 2900–2000 BC
- Preceded by: Thenacien culture
- Followed by: Aquitani?

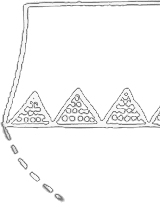
Pottery

Artenacian culture, named after the archaeological site of Artenac in Charente, appeared in the Late Chalcolithic period, c. 2400 BC, apparently as reaction to migrations of Danubian peoples into Western France.

Because it is characterized by its abundant arrow points, it is considered a culture of bowmen. It participated fully in the megalithic culture of the Chalcolithic period.

"Scale decoration" is common in pottery of the Artenacian culture.

In successive centuries it became dominant throughout western France, establishing a stable ethno-cultural border with the Danubian culture near the Rhine that remained stable for a whole millennium.

The Artenacian peoples are believed to be the ancestors of the historical Aquitani.

== Gallery ==
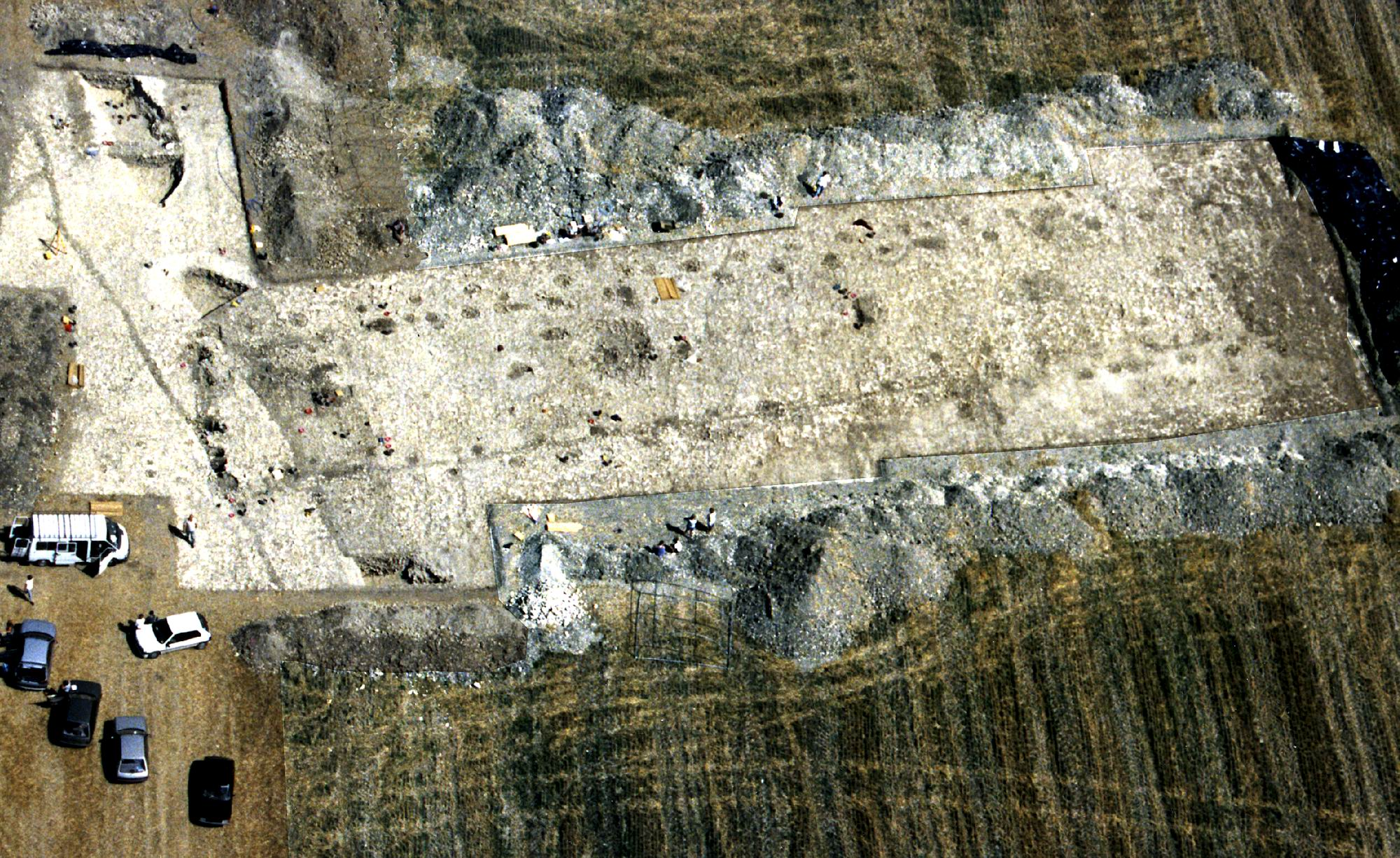
Remains of a large building at Challignac

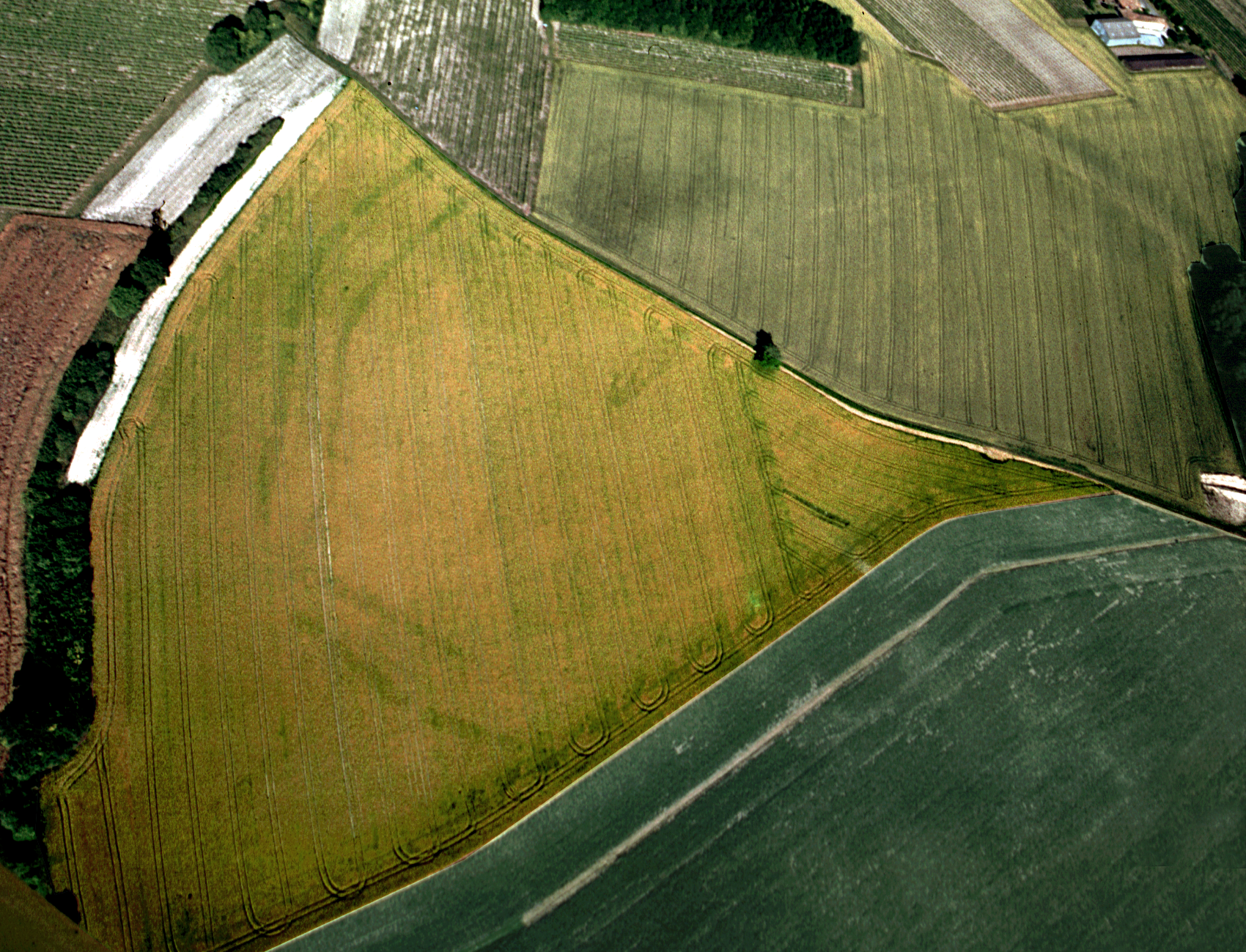
Challignac settlement, central enclosure

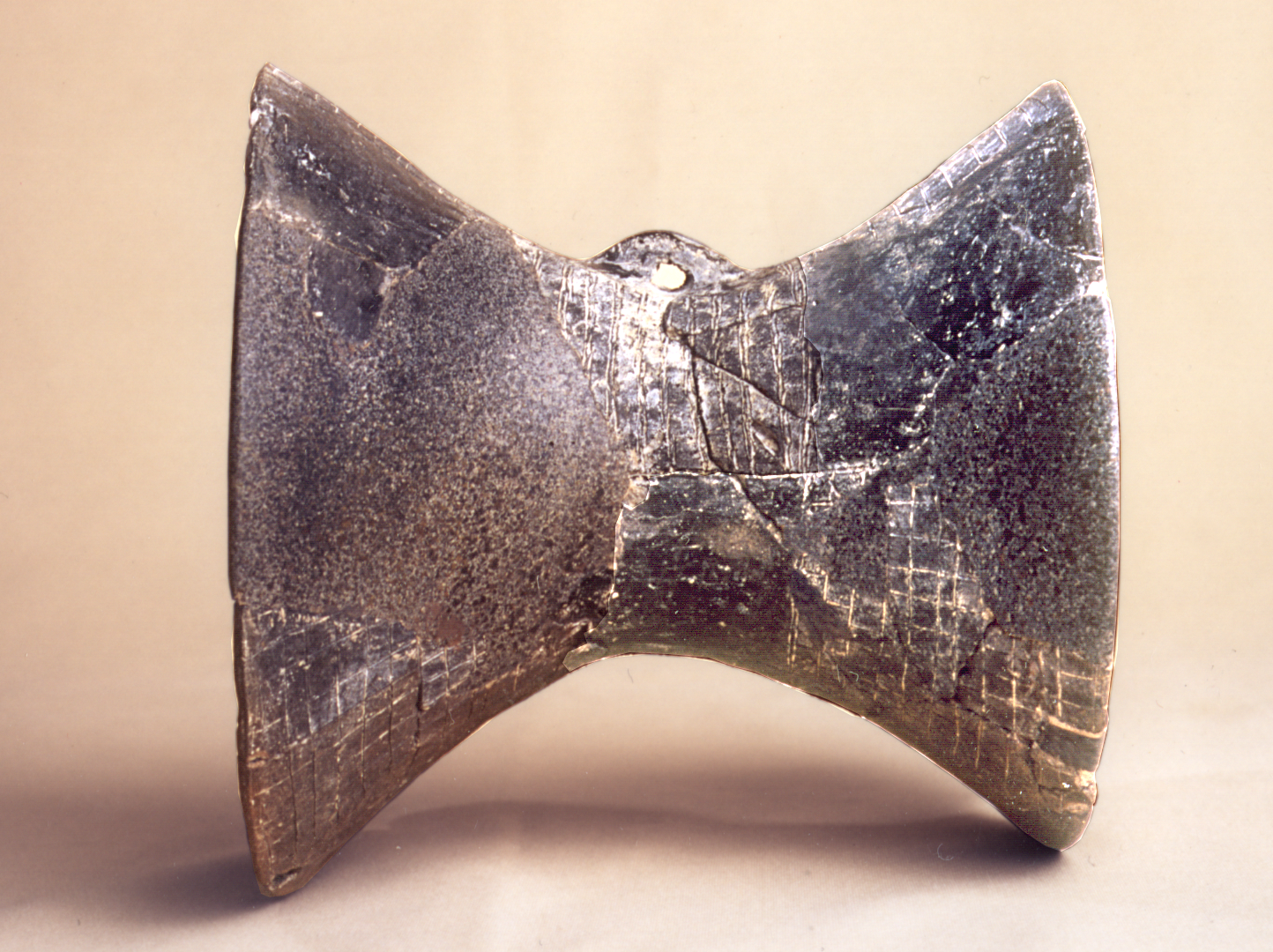

== See also ==
- Aquitani
- Aquitanian language
- Neolithic Europe
- Proto-Basque
