= Roofbox =

Archaeological feature

Roofbox above Newgrange Passage Entrance

In archaeology, a roofbox is a term for a specially contrived opening above a doorway, that is constructed in such way that at particular times of the year e.g. the winter or summer solstices, the Sun would be directly in view from the chamber or passage within.

The term was coined by Professor Michael O’Kelly during his excavation of the Newgrange passage cairn, at Brú Na Bóinne, Ireland.

The roofbox was built directly above the entrance door to the passage. The passage and chamber were specifically aligned with the rising sun of the mornings around the winter solstice in December. The 17 metre passage rises in elevation as it leads to the chamber.

The chamber floor, the roofbox and the local horizon are on a single plane and so as the sun's morning rays penetrate the roofbox, they illuminate the chamber floor for a maximum of 17 minutes (weather depending).

A roofbox is also found in Cairn G of the Carrowkeel Megalithic Cemetery.

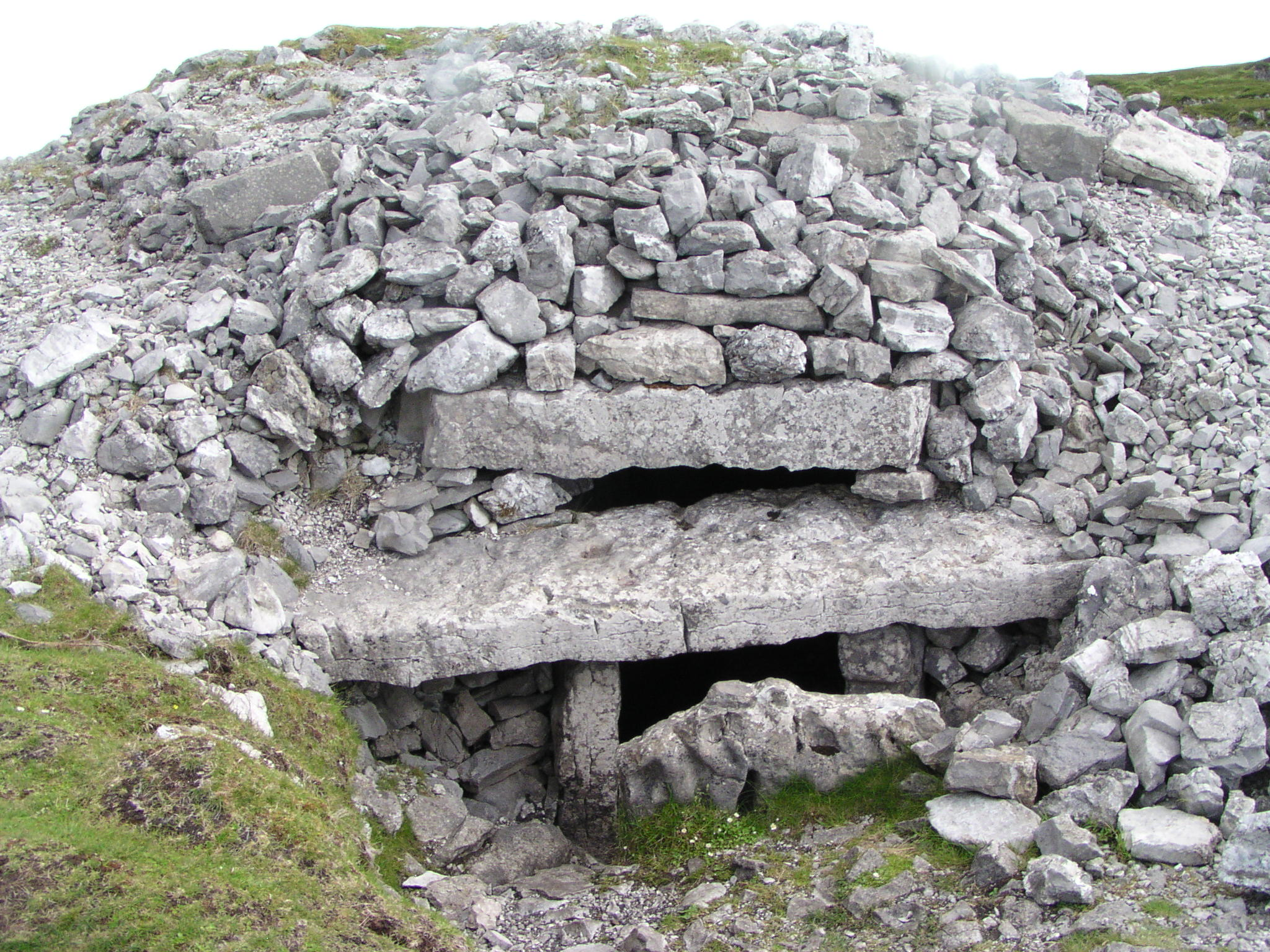
Carrowkeel, Cairn G with roofbox
