= Newgrange =

Neolithic monument in County Meath, Ireland

Coordinates: 53°41′41″N 6°28′32″W

- Sí an Bhrú (Irish)
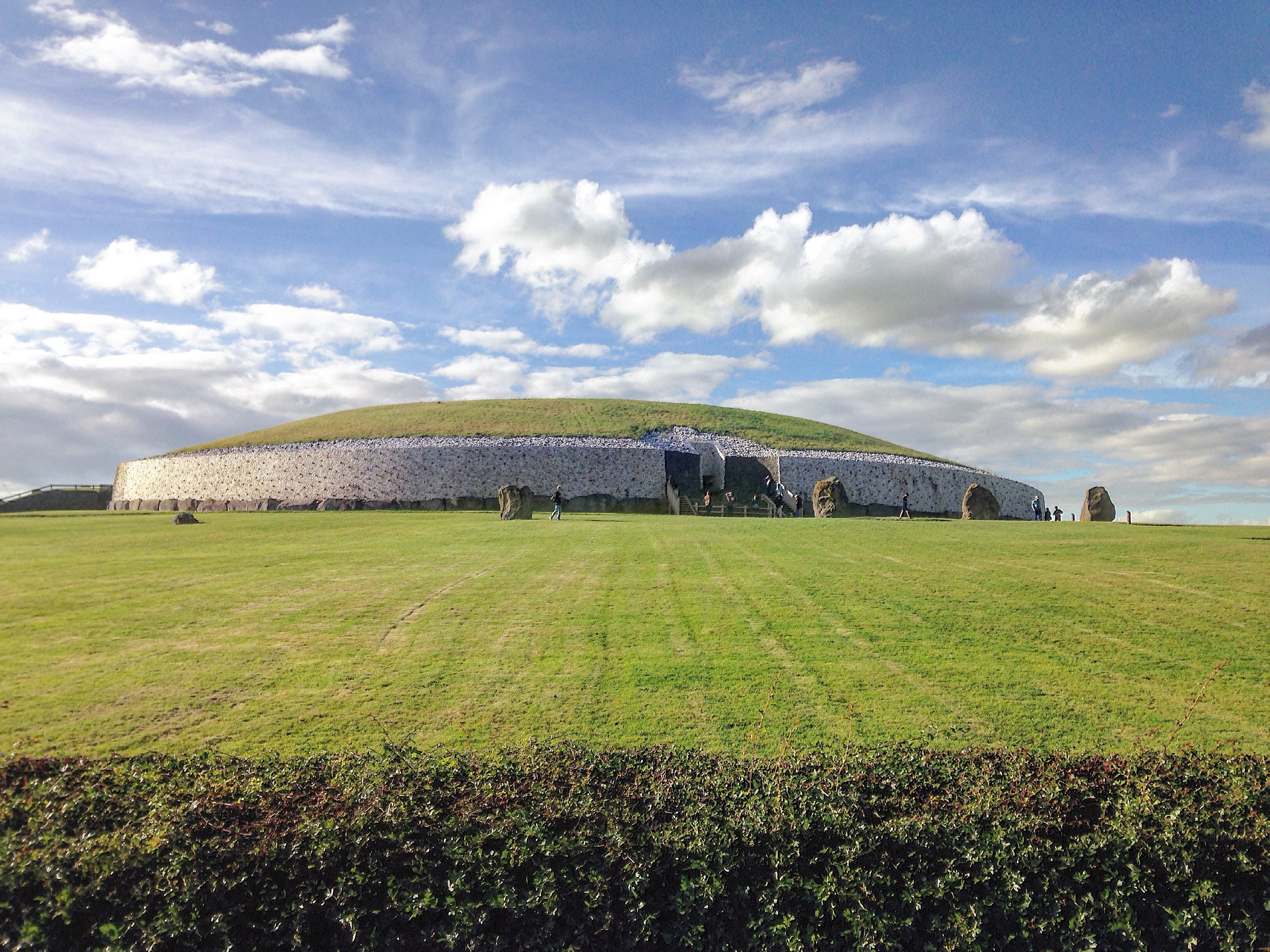
- The monument in 2016

- Location in Ireland
- Type: passage grave
- Periods: Neolithic
- Location: County Meath, Ireland

History
- Built: c. 3100 BC

Site notes
- Material: Stone
- Height: 12 metres (39 ft)
- Width: 85 m (279 ft)
- Area: 1.1 acres (0.45 ha)
- Excavation dates: 1962–1975
- Archaeologists: Michael J. O'Kelly
- Owner: National Monuments Service
- Public access: yes (guided tour only)

UNESCO World Heritage Site
- Official name: Brú na Bóinne
- Type: Cultural
- Criteria: i, iii, iv
- Designated: 1993 (17th session)
- Reference no.: 659 (official listing)
- Region: Europe

Newgrange (Irish: Sí an Bhrú) is a prehistoric monument in County Meath in Ireland, placed on a rise overlooking the River Boyne, eight kilometres (five miles) west of the town of Drogheda. It is an exceptionally grand passage tomb built during the Neolithic Period, around 3100 BC, making it older than Stonehenge and the Egyptian pyramids. Newgrange is the main monument in the Brú na Bóinne complex, a World Heritage Site that also includes the passage tombs of Knowth and Dowth, as well as other henges, burial mounds and standing stones.

Newgrange consists of a large circular mound with an inner stone passageway and cruciform chamber. Burnt and unburnt human bones and possible grave goods or votive offerings were found in this chamber. The monument has a striking façade made mostly of white quartz cobblestones and ringed by engraved kerbstones. Many of the larger stones of Newgrange are covered in megalithic art. The mound is also ringed by a stone circle. Some of the material that makes up the monument came from as far as the Mournes and Wicklow Mountains. There is no agreement on its purpose, but it is believed to have had religious significance. It is aligned so that the rising sun on the winter solstice shines through a "roofbox" above the entrance and floods the inner chamber. Several other passage tombs in Ireland are aligned with solstices and equinoxes, and Cairn G at Carrowkeel has a similar "roofbox". Newgrange shares similarities with some other Neolithic monuments in Western Europe; especially Gavrinis in Brittany, which has a similar preserved facing and large carved stones, Maeshowe in Orkney, with its large corbelled chamber, and Bryn Celli Ddu in Wales.

Its initial period of use lasted around 1,000 years. Newgrange then gradually became a ruin, although the area continued to be a site of ritual activity. It featured in Irish mythology and folklore, in which it is said to be a dwelling of the deities, particularly The Dagda and his son Aengus. Antiquarians first began its study in the seventeenth century, and archaeological excavations began in the twentieth century. Archaeologist Michael O'Kelly led the most extensive of these from 1962 to 1975 and also reconstructed the front of the monument, a controversial reconstruction. This included an inward-curving dark stone wall to ease visitor access. Newgrange is a popular tourist site and, according to archaeologist Colin Renfrew, is "unhesitatingly regarded by the prehistorian as the great national monument of Ireland" and as one of the most important megalithic structures in Europe.

== Name and etymology ==
The monument now known as Newgrange forms part of the prehistoric landscape called Brú na Bóinne, meaning the palace or mansion of the Boyne. The name refers to the ceremonial complex along the River Boyne that includes the major passage tombs of Knowth, Dowth, and Newgrange itself.

In early Irish literature, the mound itself appears under several related names, including Sí an Bhrú and Síd in Broga. These derive from Old Irish terms associated with supernatural mounds or dwellings of the Tuatha Dé Danann, the mythological beings of Irish tradition. In this context, the name can be interpreted as meaning "the fairy mound of the Brú" or "the mound of the palace".

These forms reflect normal grammatical features of the Irish language. The word Brú ("palace" or "great house") appears as Bhrú after the definite article through a process known as lenition, a consonant mutation common in Irish grammar. The term síd refers to a mound or dwelling place of supernatural beings in early Irish tradition.

Medieval Irish texts associate the mound with the god Aengus (Aengus Óg), who was said to dwell at the Brú. These traditions are now considered to reflect later interpretations of the landscape rather than the original prehistoric function of the monument.

The modern name Newgrange is much more recent. It derives from a nearby farm or estate known as the "New Grange", part of lands belonging to Mellifont Abbey in the medieval period. Antiquarian writers in the seventeenth and eighteenth centuries adopted this estate name when describing the prehistoric mound, and the form Newgrange subsequently became standard in archaeological literature.

== Description ==
=== Mound and passage ===
The Newgrange monument primarily consists of a large mound, built of alternating layers of earth and stones, with grass growing on top and a reconstructed facade of flattish white quartz stones studded at intervals with large rounded cobbles covering part of the circumference. It consists of about 200,000 tonnes of material. The mound is 85 metres (279 ft) wide at its widest point and 12 metres (39 ft) high, and covers 4,500 square metres (1.1 acres) of ground. Within the mound is a chambered passage, which may be accessed by an entrance on the southeastern side of the monument. The passage stretches for 19 metres (60 ft), or about a third of the way into the centre of the structure. At the end of the passage are three small chambers off a larger central chamber with a high corbelled vault roof. Each of the smaller chambers has a large flat "basin stone" where the bones of the dead may have been deposited during prehistoric times. Whether it was a burial site remains unclear. The walls of this passage are made up of large stone slabs called orthostats, twenty-two of which are on the western side and twenty-one on the eastern side. They average 1.5 metres in height; several are decorated with carvings (as well as graffiti from the period after the rediscovery). The orthostats decrease in height the further into the passageway as a result of the passage being slightly graded from being constructed on the rise of a hill. The ceiling shows no evidence of smoke.

=== Standing stones ===
Situated around the perimeter of the mound is a circle of standing stones. Twelve standing stones survive out of a possible original thirty-eight. Most archaeologists suggest that they were added later, during the Bronze Age, centuries after the original monument had been abandoned as a ritual centre. This view is disputed and relates to a carbon date from a standing stone setting that intersects with a later timber post circle, the theory being, that the stone in question could have been moved and later re-set in its original position.

=== Art ===
Newgrange contains various examples of graphic Neolithic rock art carved onto its stone surfaces. These carvings fit into ten categories, five of which are curvilinear (circles, spirals, arcs, serpentiniforms, and dot-in-circles) and the other five of which are rectilinear (chevrons, lozenges, radials, parallel lines, and offsets). They are marked by wide differences in style, the skill level required to produce them, and on how deeply carved they are. One of the most notable types of art at Newgrange are the triskele-like features found on the entrance stone. It is approximately three metres long and 1.2 metres high (10 ft long and 4 ft high), and about five tonnes in weight. It has been described as "one of the most famous stones in the entire repertory of megalithic art." Archaeologists believe that most of the carvings were produced prior to the stones being erected, although the entrance stone was carved in situ before the kerbstones were placed alongside it.

Various archaeologists have speculated as to the meanings of the designs, with some, such as George Coffey (in the 1890s), believing them to be purely decorative, whilst others, such as O'Kelly, believed them to have some sort of symbolic purpose, because some of the carvings had been in places that would not have been visible, such as at the bottom of the orthostatic slabs below ground level. Extensive research on how the art relates to alignments and astronomy in the Boyne Valley complex was carried out by American-Irish researcher, Martin Brennan.

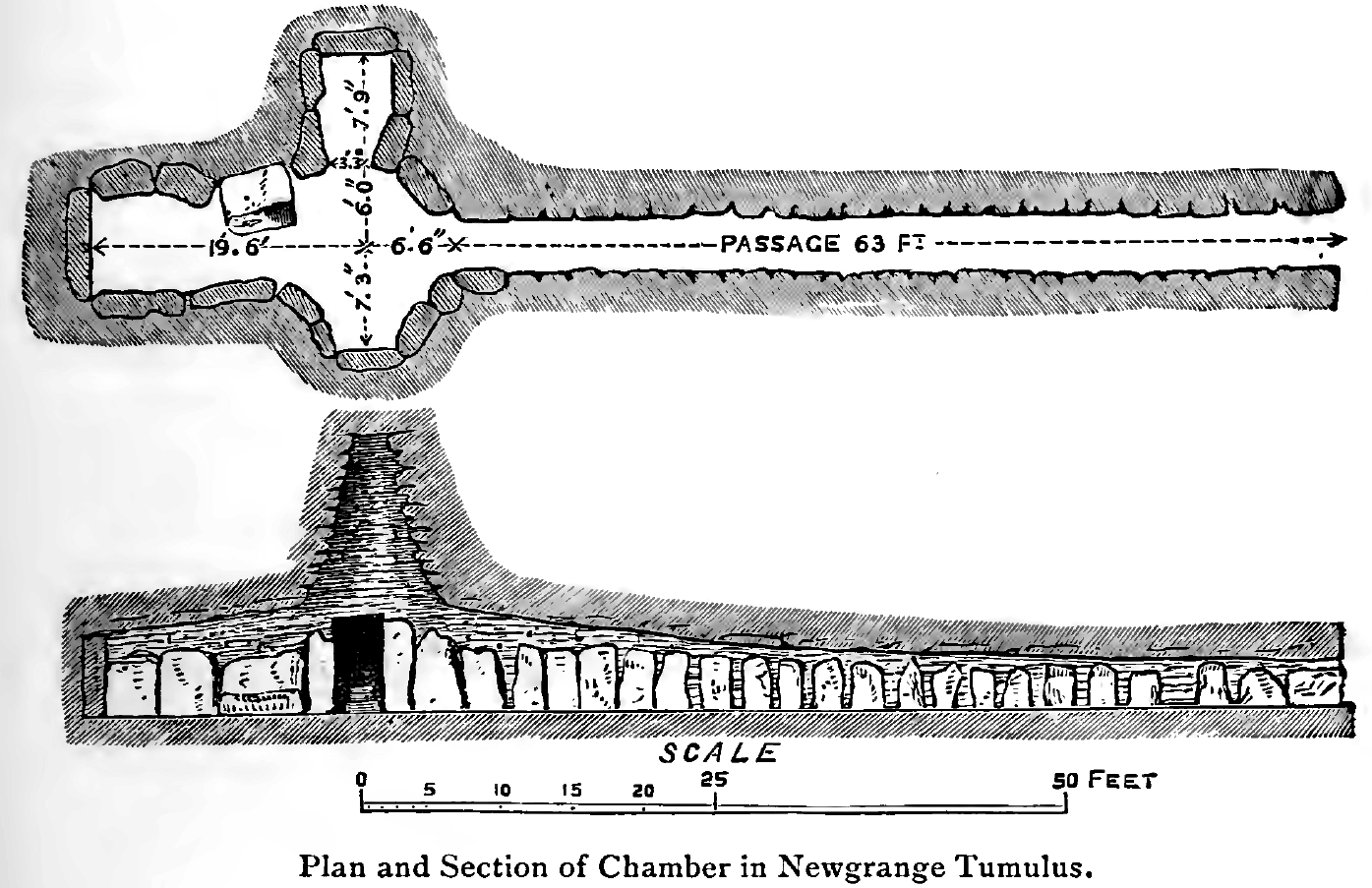
Plan and section of the passage and chamber, 1903

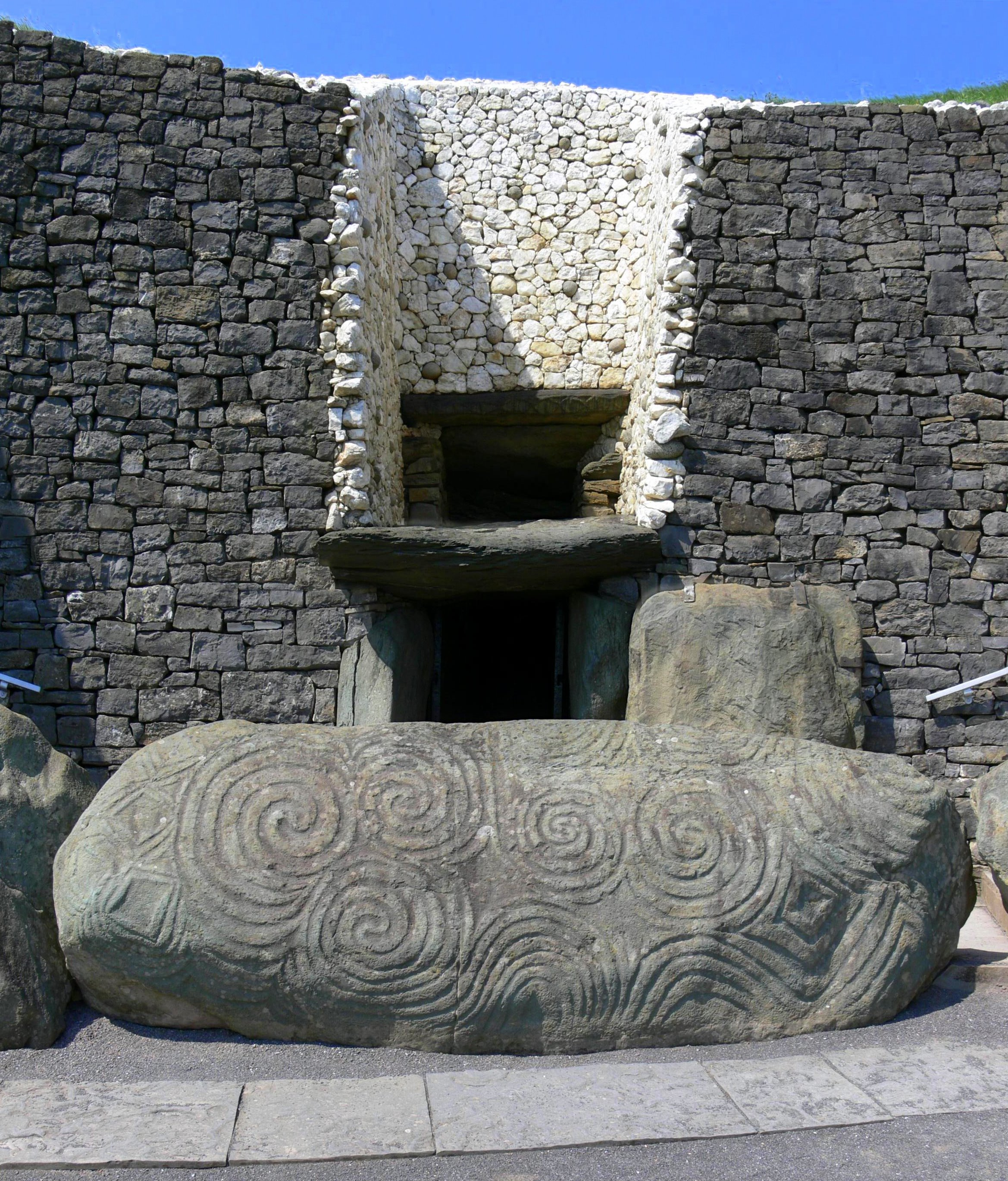
The entrance passage and entrance stone (the grey paving path is built for visitor access)

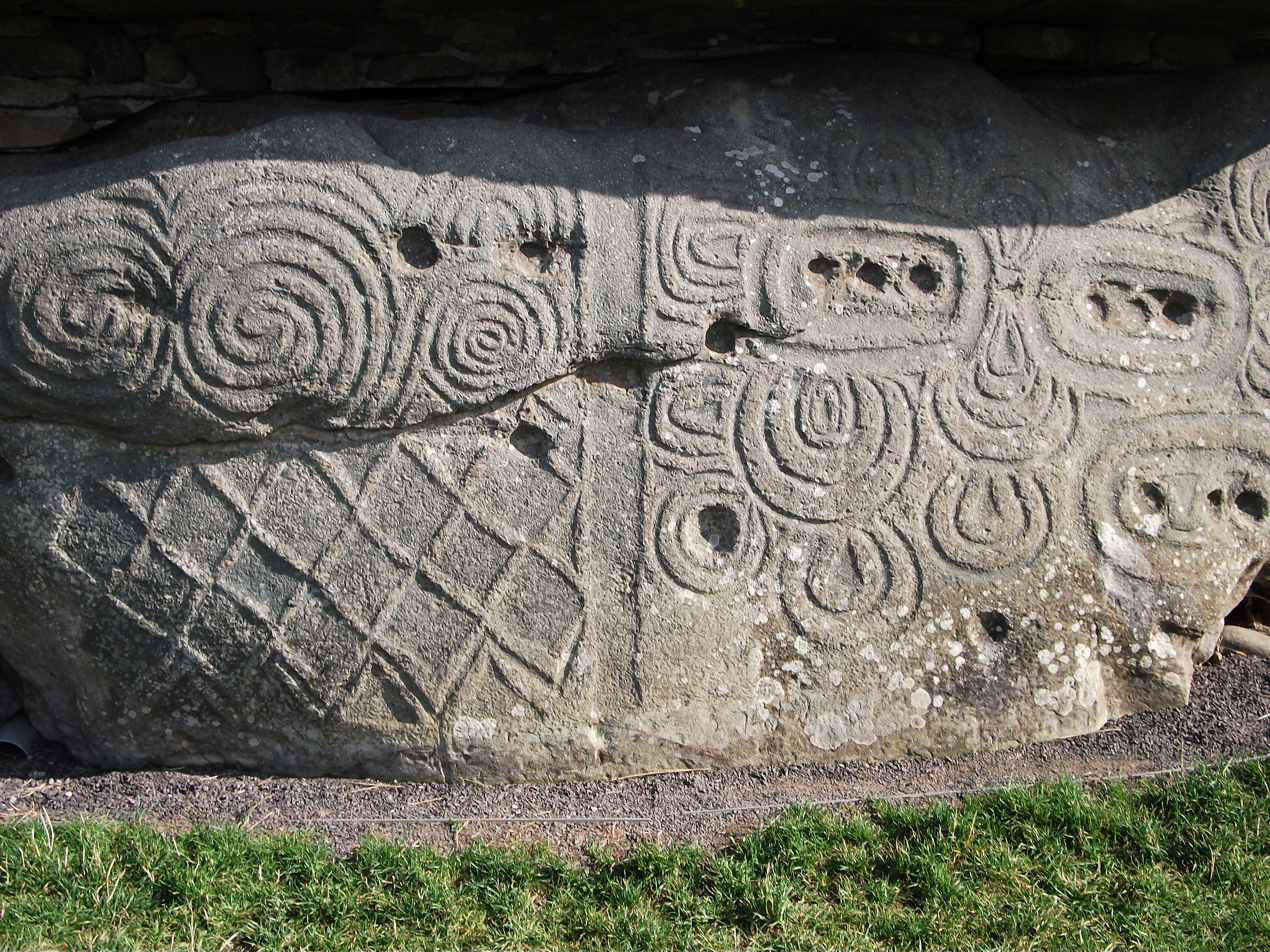
Megalithic art on the back kerbstone

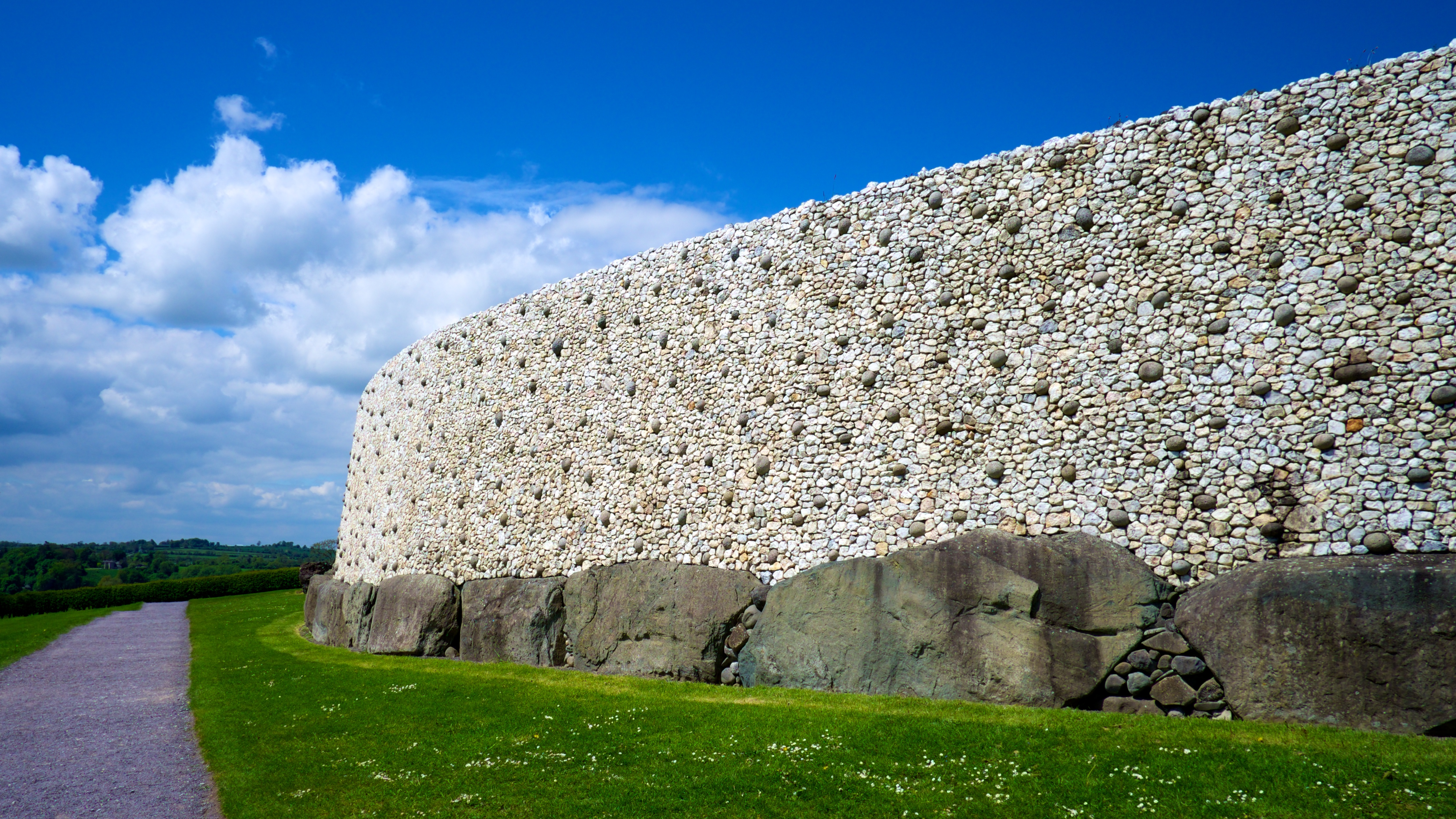
The revetment and kerbstones

== Early history ==
Models of Newgrange during its early history

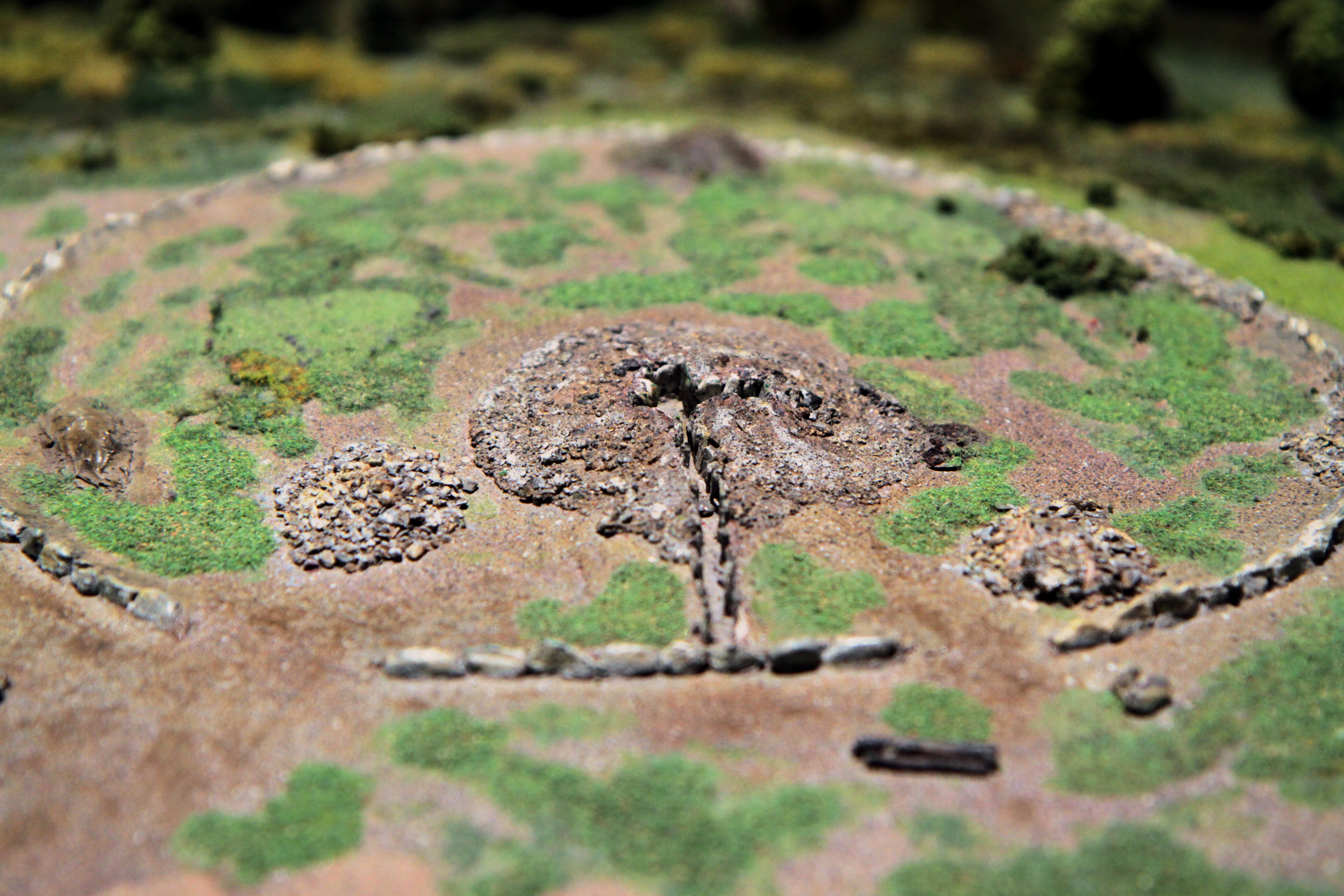
Newgrange under construction

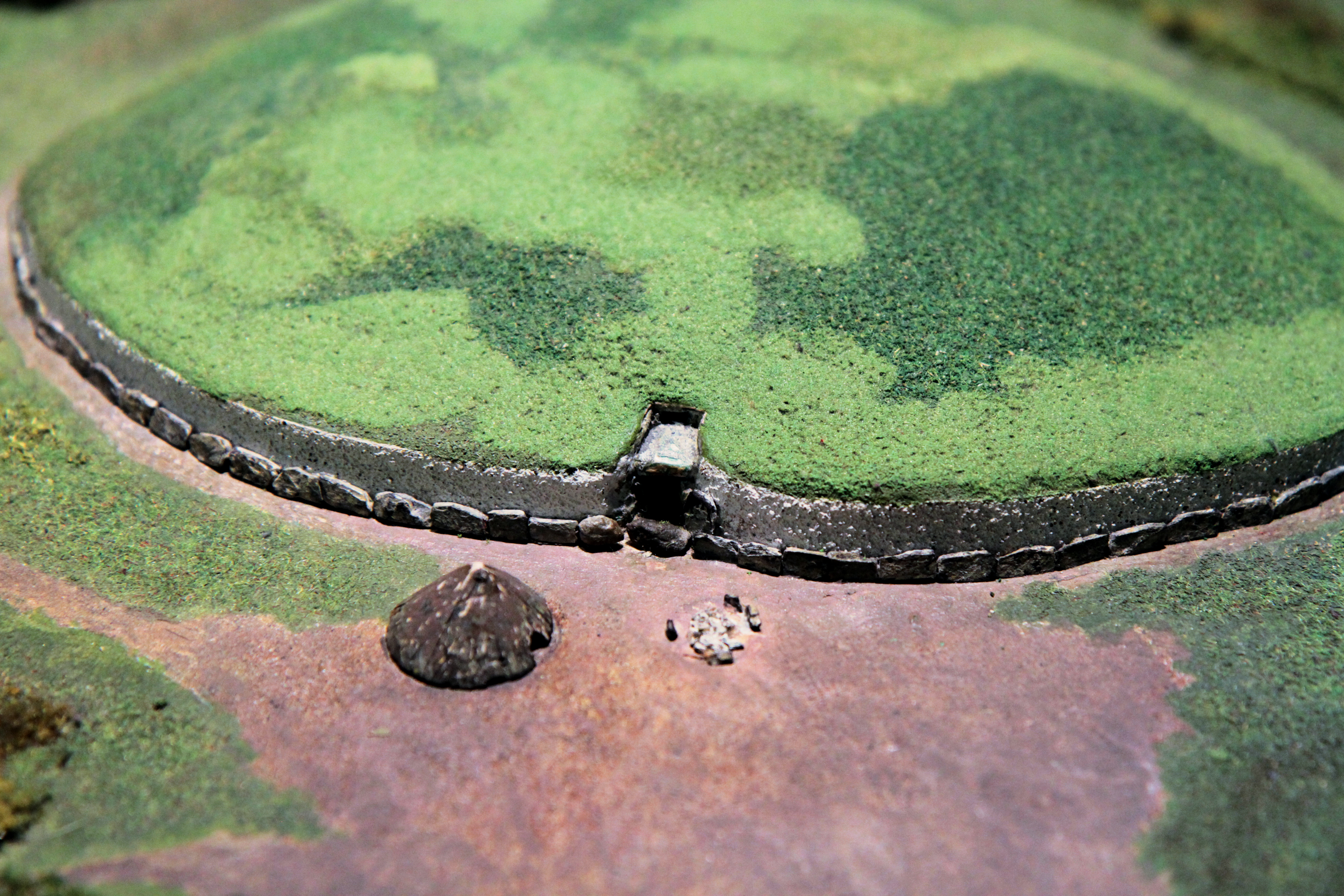
Newgrange as it most likely looked after it was built

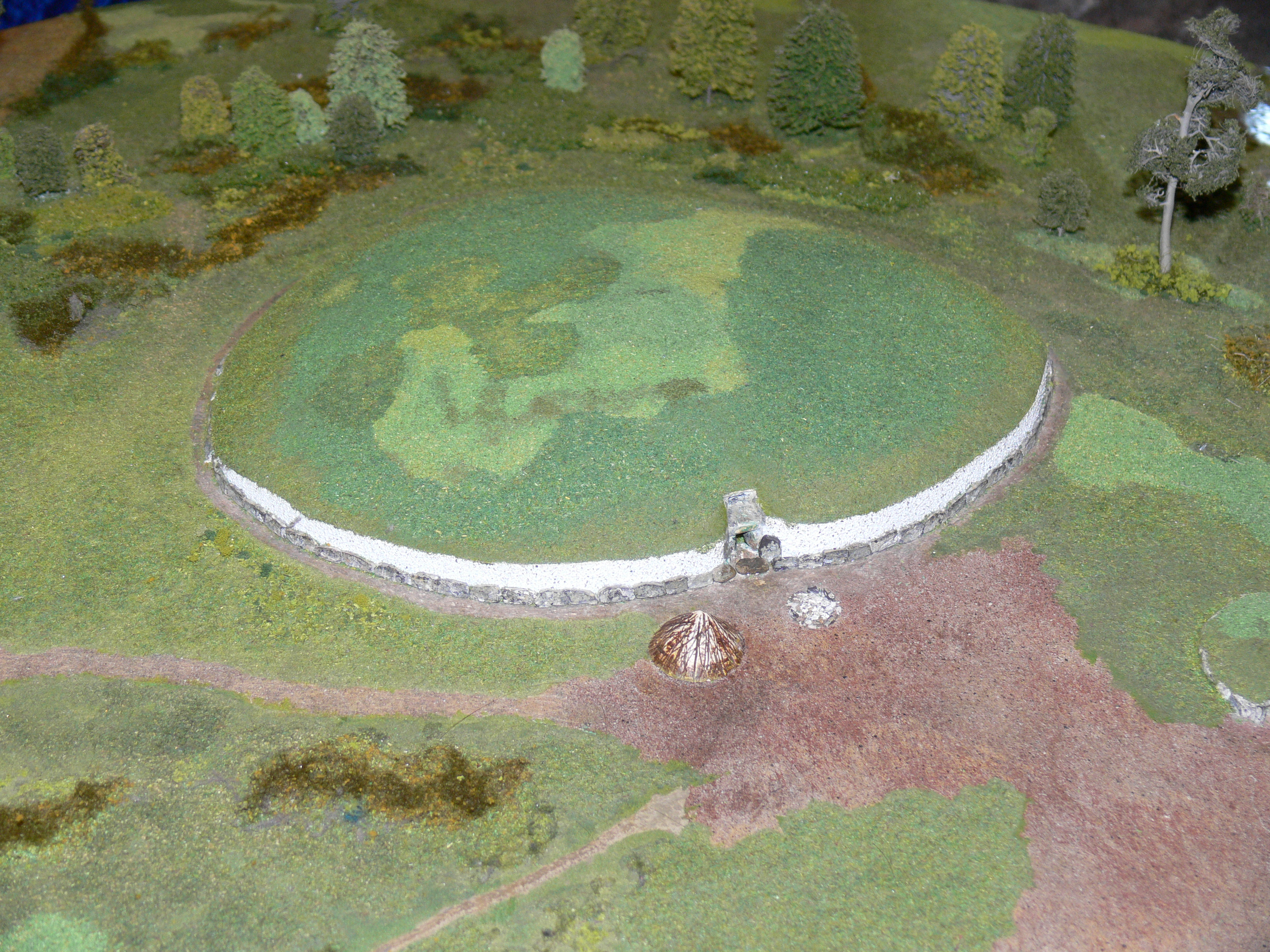
Newgrange after it was built

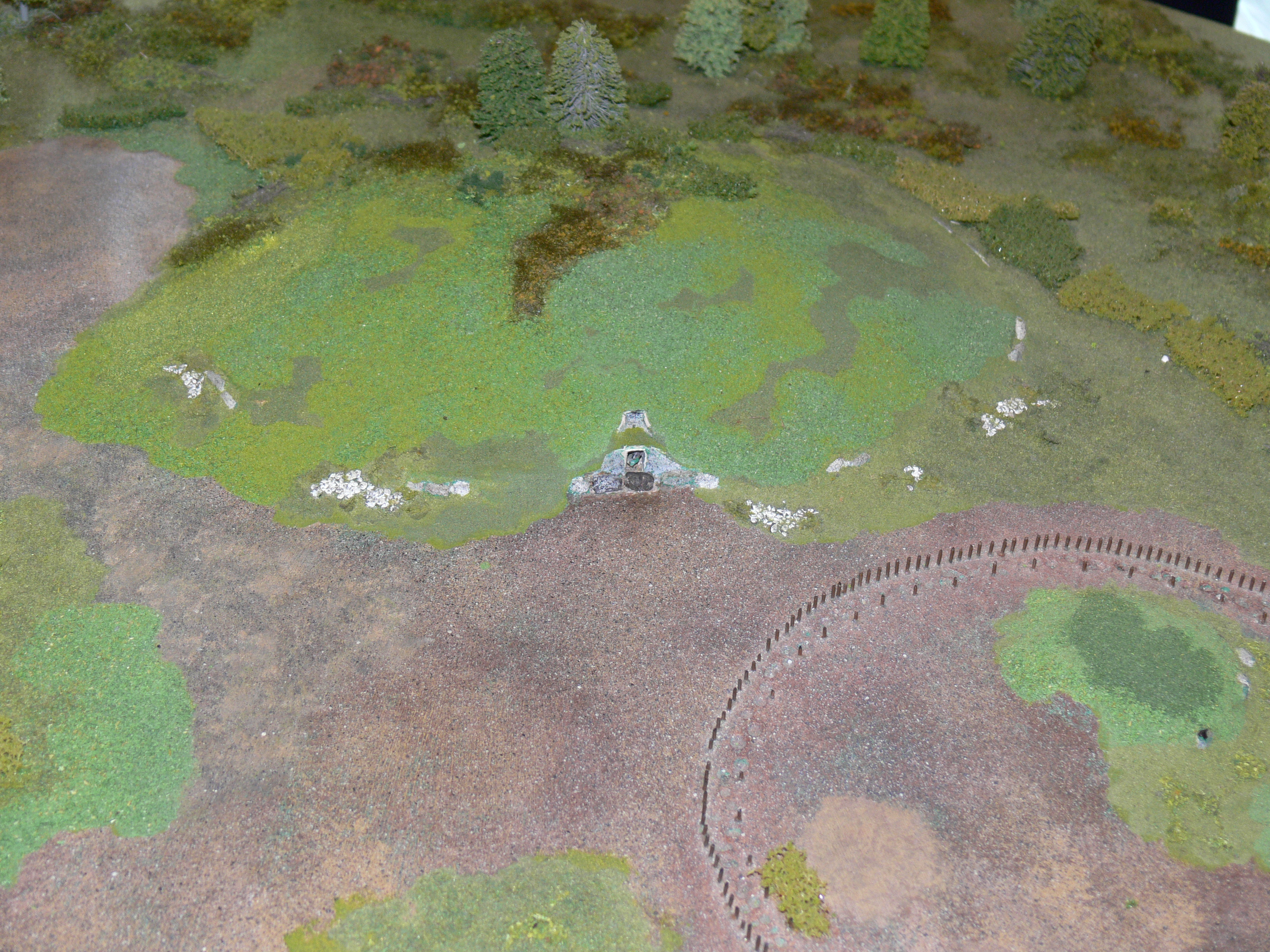
Newgrange in the Bronze Age

The Neolithic people who built the monument were native agriculturalists, descended most likely from a vast Anatolian immigration wave 9,000 years ago - that eventually displaced indigenous hunter-gatherer populations - growing crops and raising animals such as cattle in the area where their settlements were located.

=== Construction ===
The original complex of Newgrange was built around 3100 BC. According to carbon-14 dates, it is approximately 500 years older than the current form of Stonehenge and the Great Pyramid of Giza in Egypt, as well as predating the Mycenaean culture of ancient Greece. Some put its period of construction somewhat later, at 3000 to 2500 BC. Geological analysis indicates that the thousands of pebbles that make up the cairn, which together would have weighed about 200,000 tonnes, came from the nearby river terraces of the Boyne. There is a large pond in this area that is believed to be the site quarried for the pebbles by the builders of Newgrange. Most of the 547 slabs that make up the inner passage, chambers, and the outer kerbstones are greywacke. Some or all of the greywacke stones may have been brought from sites approximately 5 km away, while a portion of them may have come from the rocky beach at Clogherhead, County Louth, about 20 km to the northeast. The facade and entrance were built with white quartz cobblestones from the Wicklow Mountains, about 50 km to the south; dark rounded granodiorite cobbles from the Mourne Mountains, about 50 km to the north; dark gabbro cobbles from the Cooley Mountains; and banded siltstone from the shore at Carlingford Lough. The stones may have been transported to Newgrange by sea and up the River Boyne by fastening them to the underside of boats at low tide. None of the structural slabs were quarried, for they show signs of having been weathered naturally, so they must have been collected and then transported, largely uphill, to the Newgrange site. The granite basins found inside the chambers also came from the Mournes.

Frank Mitchell suggested that the monument could have been built within a space of five years, basing his estimation upon the likely number of local inhabitants during the Neolithic and the amount of time they could have devoted to building it rather than farming. This estimate, however, was criticised by Michael J. O'Kelly and his archaeological team, who believed that it would have taken a minimum of thirty years to build.

=== Burials ===
Excavations have revealed deposits of both burnt and unburnt human bone in the passage, indicating human corpses had been placed within it, some of whom had been cremated. Examination of the unburnt bone, revealed it came from at least two separate individuals, but much of their skeletons were missing, and what was left had been scattered about the passage. Various grave goods were deposited alongside the bodies inside the passage. Excavations in the late 1960s and early 1970s revealed seven "marbles", four pendants, two beads, a used flint flake, a bone chisel, and fragments of bone pins and points. Many more artefacts had been found in the passage in previous centuries by visiting antiquarians and tourists, but most were removed and have since disappeared, possibly held in private collections. Nonetheless, some were recorded, and it is believed that the grave goods from Newgrange were typical of Neolithic Irish passage grave assemblages. The remains of animals have also been found in the structure, primarily those of mountain hares, rabbits, and dogs, but also of bats, sheep, goats, cattle, song thrushes, and more rarely, molluscs and frogs. Most of these animals would have entered and died in the chamber many centuries or even millennia after it was constructed—for instance, rabbits were not introduced to Ireland until the thirteenth century.

DNA analysis found that a cranial bone deposited in the most elaborate chamber belonged to a man whose parents were first-degree relatives, possibly brother and sister. Historically, such inbreeding was usually only found in royal dynasties headed by "god-kings", such as the pharaohs of ancient Egypt, who married among themselves to keep the royal bloodline "pure". This, together with the prestige of the burial, could mean that a similar elite group were responsible for building Newgrange, and that it was a royal tomb. The man was distantly related to people buried in the Carrowkeel and Carrowmore tombs. However, archaeologist Alasdair Whittle said that social differences in the Neolithic were often short-lived, speculating that an elite may have arisen temporarily in response to a crisis. He suggested that Newgrange may have been a communal monument at certain times and co-opted as a personal tomb for brief periods. Another group of archaeologists criticized the extrapolation from one specimen to an entire social order based on "god-kings" as an analytical over-reach, based on "a very selective use of ethnographic analogies". They concluded that "a social model postulating rigid systems of social stratification in Neolithic Ireland is not a good fit with the evidence".

=== Purpose ===
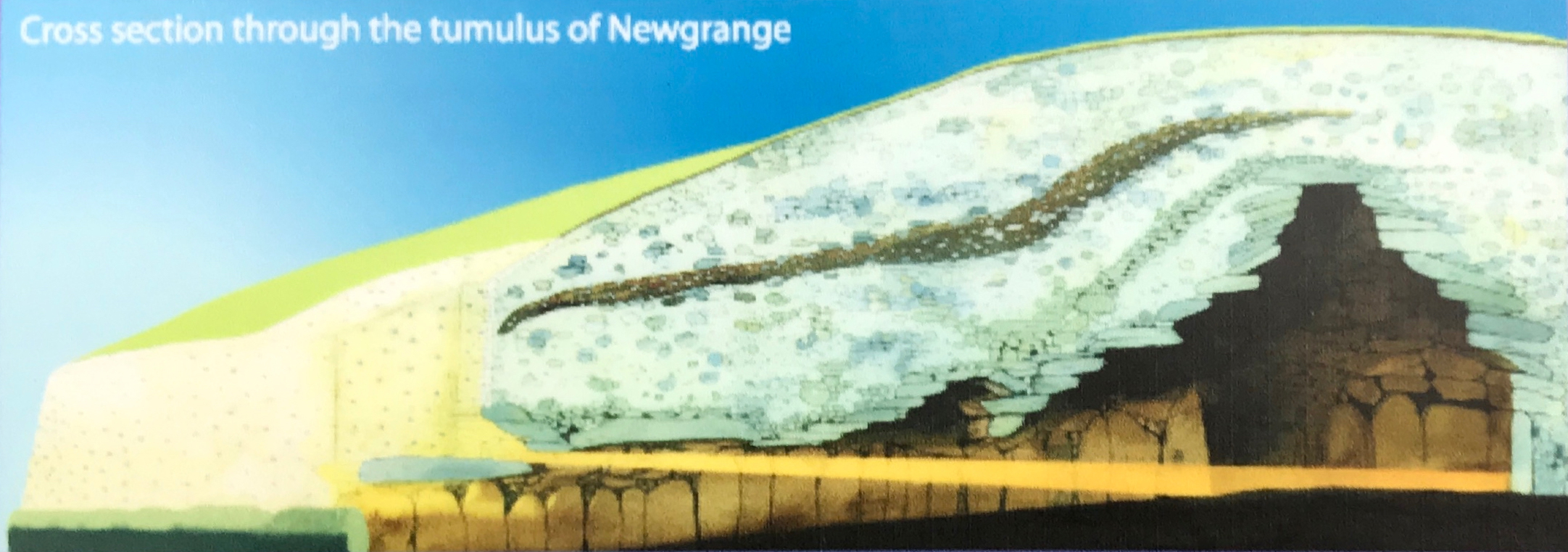
Cross section showing sunlight reaching the chamber on the winter solstice

There have been various debates as to its original purpose. Many archaeologists believe that the monument had some religious significance, either as a place of worship for a "cult of the dead" or for an astronomically based faith. O'Kelly believed that the monument had to be seen in relation to the nearby Knowth and Dowth, and that the building of Newgrange "cannot be regarded as other than the expression of some kind of powerful force or motivation, brought to the extremes of aggrandizement in these three monuments, the cathedrals of the megalithic religion." O'Kelly believed that Newgrange, alongside the hundreds of other passage tombs built in Ireland during the Neolithic, showed evidence of a religion that venerated the dead as one of its core principles. He believed that this "cult of the dead" was just one particular form of European neolithic religion, and that other megalithic monuments displayed evidence of differing beliefs that were solar-oriented, rather than ancestor-oriented.

Studies in other fields of expertise offer alternative interpretations of the possible functions, principally centring on astronomy, engineering, geometry, and mythology associated with the Boyne monuments. It is speculated that the sun became an important part of the religious beliefs of the Neolithic people who built it. One idea was that the room was designed as ritualistic, capturing the rays of the sun on the year's shortest day, the winter solstice. On this day, the room is flooded with sunlight, perhaps signalling that the days would start to get longer again. This view is strengthened by the discovery of alignments in Knowth, Dowth, and the Lough Crew Cairns, leading to the interpretation of these monuments as calendrical or astronomical devices.

Once a year, at the Winter Solstice, the rising sun shines directly along the long passage with a solar height of about 1.3°, illuminating the inner chamber and revealing the carvings inside, notably the triple spiral on the front wall of the chamber. This illumination lasts for approximately 17 minutes. Michael J. O'Kelly was the first person in modern times to observe this event on 21 December 1967. The sunlight enters the passage through a specially contrived opening, known as a roofbox, directly above the main entrance. Although solar alignments are not uncommon among passage graves, Newgrange is one of the few containing the additional roofbox feature. (Cairn G at Carrowkeel Megalithic Cemetery is another, and it has been suggested that one can be found at Bryn Celli Ddu.) The alignment is such that although the roofbox is above the passage entrance, the light hits the floor of the inner chamber. Today, the first light enters about four minutes after sunrise and strikes the middle of the chamber but cannot reach the chamber´s back wall any more as it did 5,000 years ago. The reason is the change of the axial tilt of the earth from 24° to 23.4° during that time period. This has shifted the azimut of the sunrise point by around 1.3° eastward and thus changed the ideal positioning of the roofbox to illuminate the full length of the chamber up to the chamber's back wall. The solar alignment at Newgrange is very precise compared to similar phenomena at other passage graves such as Dowth or Maes Howe in the Orkney Islands, off the coast of Scotland.

During much of the Neolithic period, the Newgrange area continued as a focus of some ceremonial activity.

=== Bronze Age and Iron Age ===
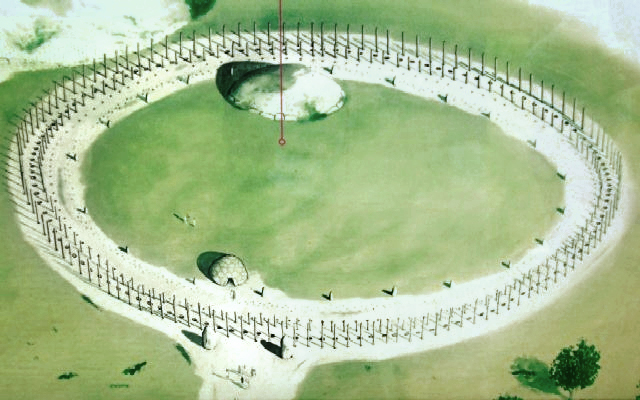
Timber circle, Early Bronze Age, Bell Beaker culture

By the onset of the Bronze Age, it appears that Newgrange was no longer being used by the local population, who left no artefacts in the structure or buried their dead there. O'Kelly stated, "by 2000 [BC] Newgrange was in decay and squatters were living around its collapsing edge". These people were adherents of the Beaker culture, which had been imported from mainland Europe, and made Beaker-style pottery locally. A large timber circle (or henge) was built to the southeast of the main mound, and a smaller timber circle to the west. The eastern timber circle consisted of five concentric rows of pits. The outer row contained wooden posts. The next row of pits had clay linings and was used to burn animal remains. The three inner rows of pits were dug to accept the animal remains. Within the circle were post and stake-holes associated with Beaker pottery and flint flakes. The western timber circle consisted of two concentric rows of parallel postholes and pits defining a circle 20 metres (66 ft) in diameter. A concentric mound of clay was constructed around the southern and western sides of the mound that covered a structure consisting of two parallel lines of post and ditches that had been partly burnt. A free-standing circle of large stones was raised around the Newgrange mound. Near the entrance, seventeen hearths were used to set fires. These structures at Newgrange are generally contemporary with several henges known from the Boyne Valley, at Newgrange Site A, Newgrange Site O, Dowth Henge, and Monknewtown Henge.

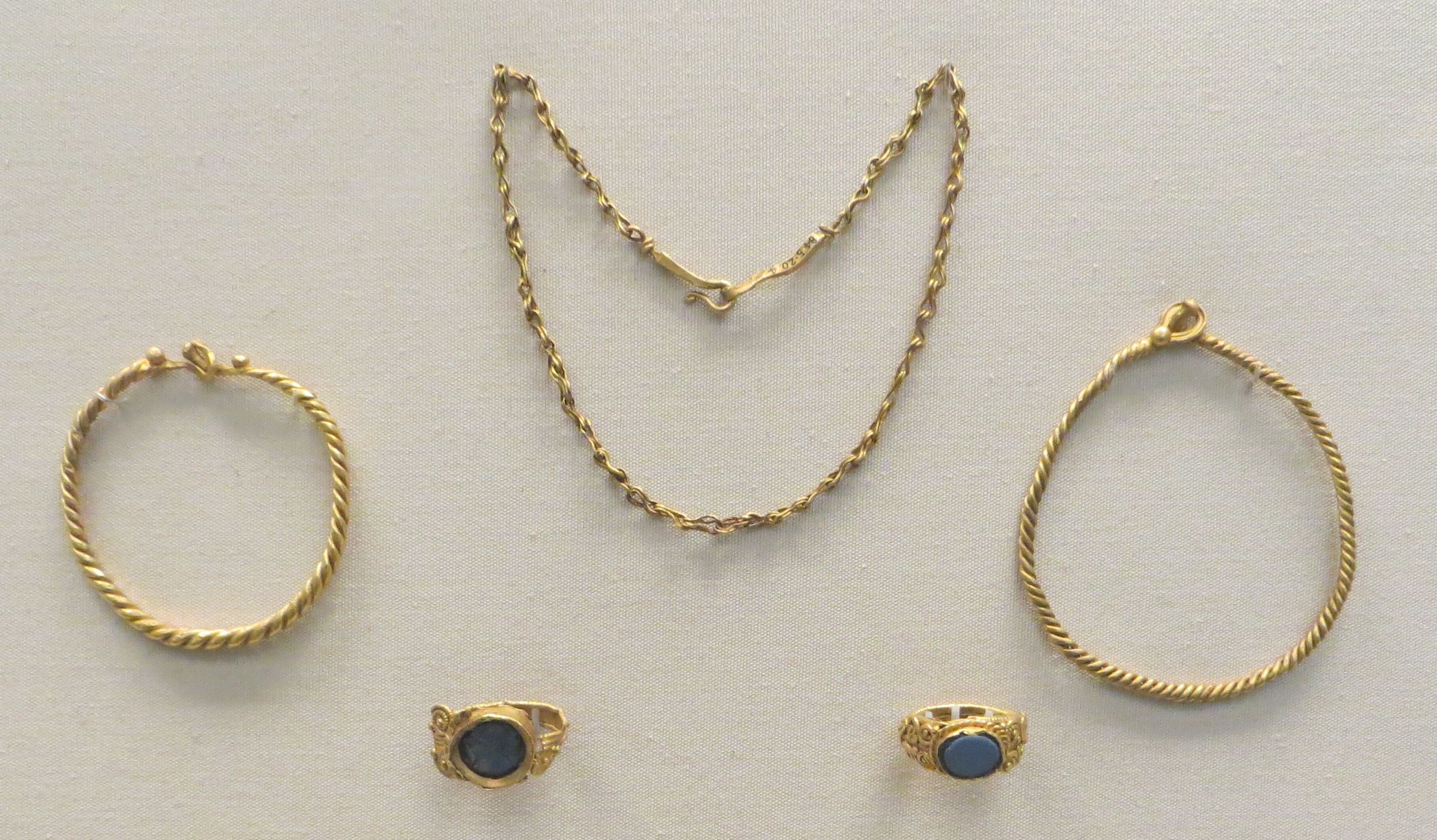
Gold jewellery from the Roman period found at the mound (British Museum)

The site evidently continued to have some ritual significance into the Iron Age. Among various objects later deposited around the mound are two pendants made from gold Roman coins of 320–337 AD (now in the National Museum of Ireland) and Roman gold jewellery including two bracelets, two finger rings, and a necklace, now in the collections of the British Museum.

The culture that built Newgrange is sometimes confused with the much later Celtic culture, and designs on the stones are misdescribed as "Celtic". However, recent archaeogenetics suggests that the west European neolithic population was largely replaced by later arrivals.

== Mythology ==
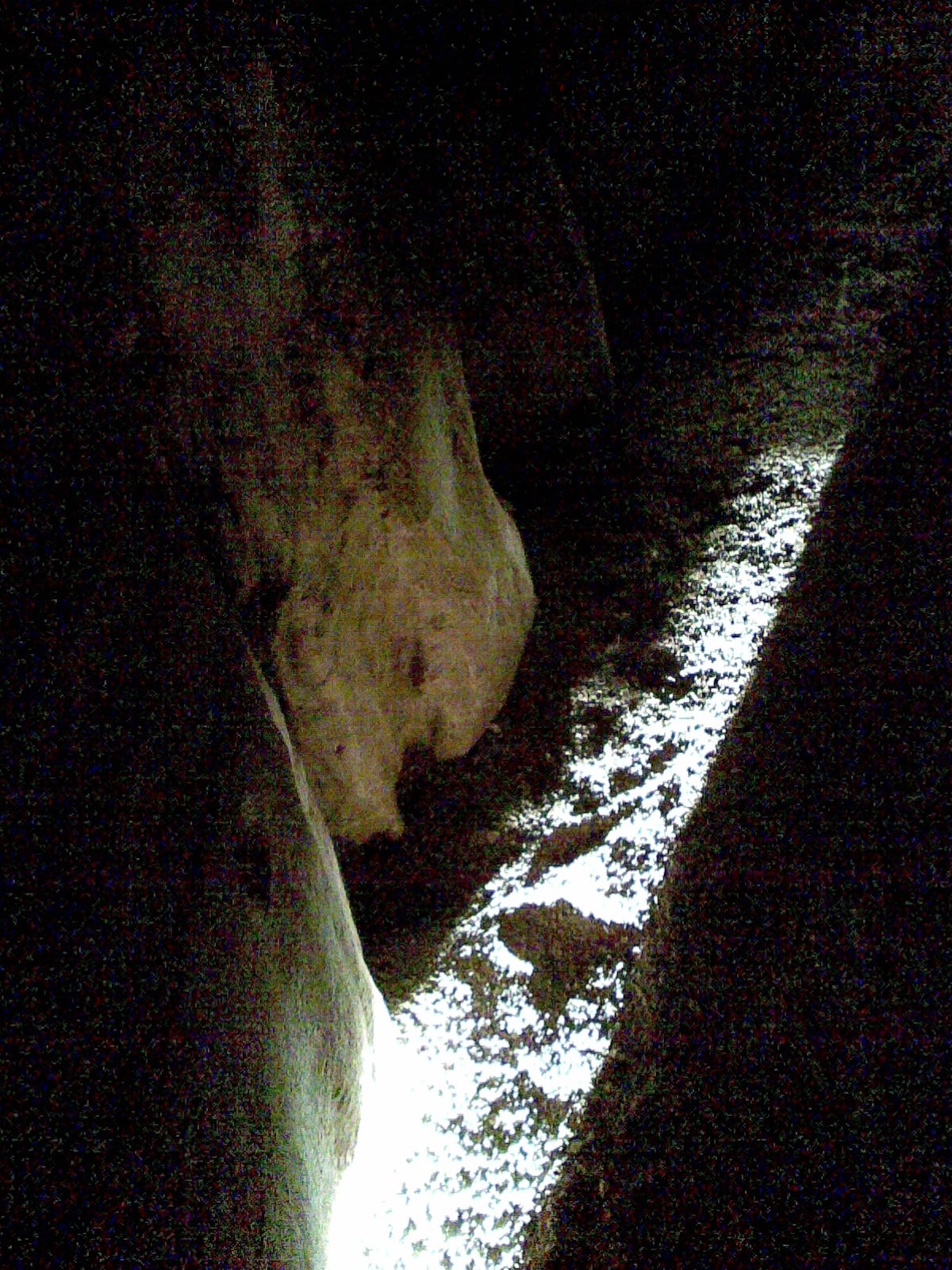
Sunlight entering the chamber around[?] the time of the winter solstice

In Irish mythology, Newgrange is often called Síd in Broga (modern Sídhe an Brugha or Sí an Bhrú). Like other passage tombs, it is described as a portal to the Otherworld and a dwelling of the divine Tuatha Dé Danann.

In one tale the Dagda, the chief god, desires Boann, the goddess of the River Boyne. She lives at Brú na Bóinne with her husband Elcmar. The Dagda impregnates her after sending Elcmar away on a one-day errand. To hide the pregnancy from Elcmar, the Dagda casts a spell on him, making "the sun stand still" so he will not notice the passing of time. Meanwhile, Boann gives birth to Aengus, who is also known as Maccán Óg ("the young son"). Eventually, Aengus learns that the Dagda is his true father and asks him for a portion of land. In some versions of the tale, the Dagda helps Aengus take ownership of the Brú from Elcmar. Aengus asks to have the Brú for "a day and night", but then claims it forever, because all time is made up of "day and night". Other versions have Aengus taking over the Brú from the Dagda himself by using the same trick. The Brú is then named Brug maic ind Óig after him. In The Pursuit of Diarmuid and Gráinne, Aengus takes Diarmuid's body to the Brú.

It has been suggested that this tale represents the winter solstice illumination of Newgrange, during which the sunbeam (the Dagda) enters the inner chamber (the womb of Boann) when the sun's path stands still. The word solstice (Irish grianstad) means sun-standstill. The conception of Aengus may represent the "rebirth" of the sun at the winter solstice, him taking over the Brú from an older god, representing the growing sun taking over from the waning sun. This could mean that knowledge of the event survived for thousands of years before being recorded as a myth in the Middle Ages. John Carey, an expert on Irish mythology, says that the tales of Brú na Bóinne are the only Irish legends where a sacred site is linked with the control of time.

There is a similar tale about Dowth (Dubhadh), one of the other Boyne Valley tombs. It tells how King Bresal compels the men of Ireland to build a tower to heaven within a day. His sister casts a spell, making the sun stand still so that one day lasts indefinitely. However, Bresal commits incest with his sister, which breaks the spell. The sun sets, and the builders leave, hence the name Dubhadh ("darkening"). This tale has also been linked with recent DNA analysis, which found that a man buried at Newgrange had parents who were most likely siblings (see #Construction and burials).

Newgrange is described in some myths as "white-topped", "brilliant to approach", and "chequered with many lights". Archaeologist Claire O'Kelly wrote that these could be "references to the glistening white quartz of the Newgrange mound".

Local folklore about Newgrange survived into the modern era.

== Modern history ==
Sometime after 1142, the structure became part of outlying farmland owned by the Cistercian Abbey of Mellifont. These farms were referred to as "granges". Newgrange is not mentioned in any of the early charters of the twelfth and thirteenth centuries, but an Inspeximus granted by Edward III in 1348 includes a Nova Grangia among the demesne lands of the abbey.

=== Antiquarianism in the 17th and 18th centuries ===
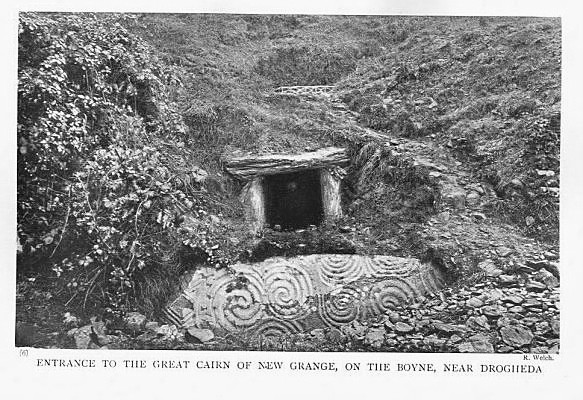
The entrance to Newgrange when the mound had become largely overgrown, photo before 1905

In 1699, the local landowner, a Williamite settler, Charles Campbell, ordered some of his farm labourers to dig up a part of Newgrange, which then had the appearance of a large mound of earth, so that he could collect stone from within it. The labourers soon discovered the entrance to the tomb within the mound, and a Welsh antiquarian named Edward Lhwyd, who was staying in the area, was alerted and took an interest in the monument. He wrote an account of the mound and its tomb, describing what he saw as its "barbarous sculpture" and noting that animal bones, beads, and pieces of glass had been found inside of it (modern archaeologists have speculated that these latter two were in fact the polished pottery beads that subsequently have been found at the site and that were a common feature of Neolithic tombs). Soon another antiquarian visitor, Sir Thomas Molyneux, professor at Trinity College Dublin, also came to the site. He talked to Charles Campbell, who informed him that he had found the remains of two human corpses in the tomb, one (which was male) in one of the cisterns and another farther along the passageway, something that Lhwyd had not noted. Subsequently, Newgrange was visited by a number of antiquarians, who often performed their own measurements of the site and made their own observations, which often were published in various antiquarian journals; these included such figures as William Wilde, Thomas Pownall, Thomas Wright, John O'Donovan, George Petrie, and James Ferguson.

These antiquarians often concocted their own theories about the origins of Newgrange, many of which have since been proved incorrect. Thomas Pownall conducted a very detailed survey of New Grange in 1769, which numbers all the stones and also records some of the carvings on the stone and asserts that the mound originally had been taller and a lot of the stone on top of it had been removed, a theory that has been disproven by archaeological research. The majority of these antiquarians also refused to believe that it was ancient peoples native to Ireland who built the monument, with many believing that it had been built in the early medieval period by invading Vikings, whilst others speculated that it had been built by the ancient Egyptians, ancient Indians, or the Phoenicians.

At some time in the early 1800s, a folly was built a few yards behind Newgrange. The folly, with two circular windows, was made of stones taken from Newgrange.

=== Conservation, archaeological investigation and reconstruction ===
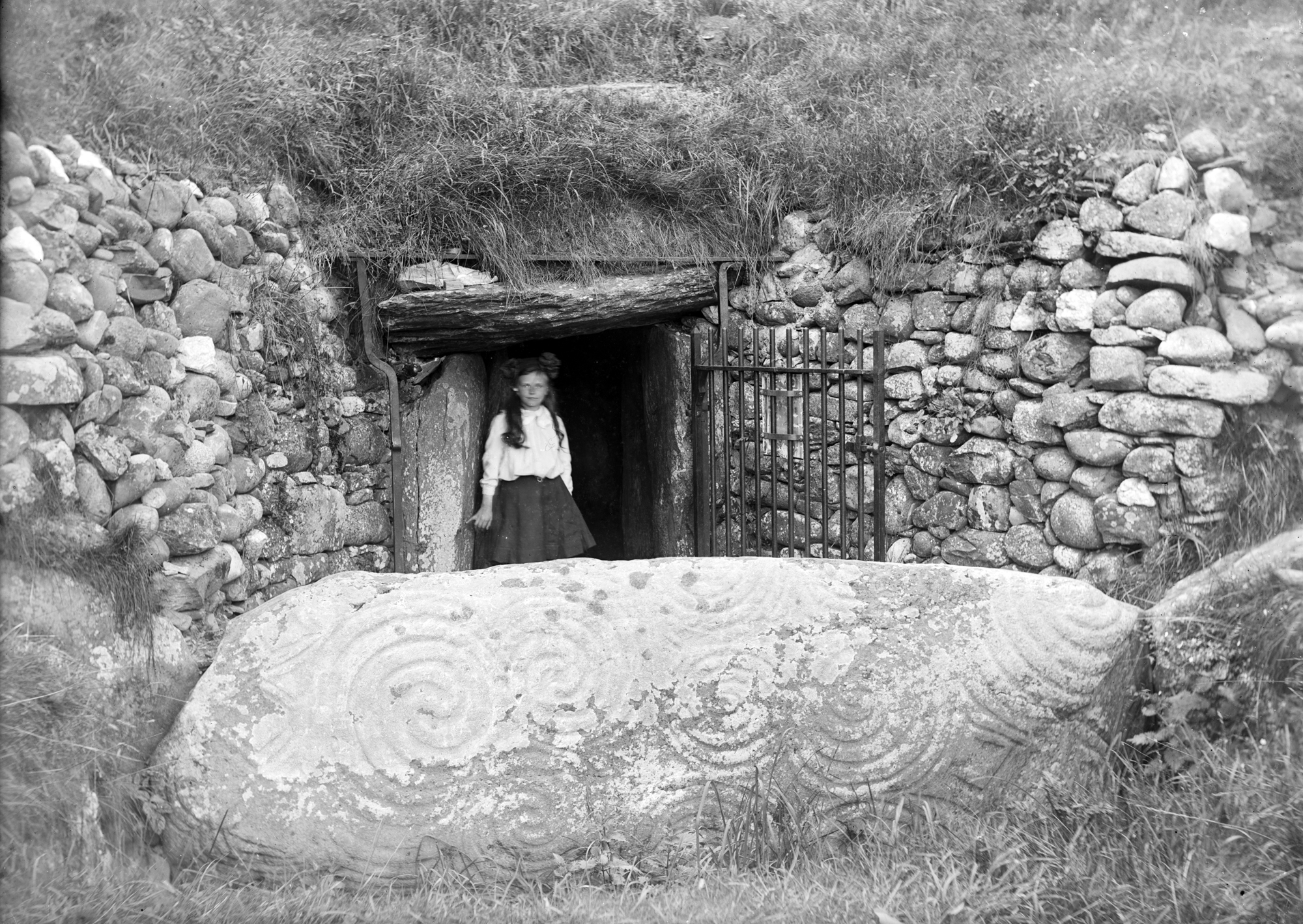
The entrance to Newgrange in the early 1900s, after much of the debris had been cleared and a drystone wall built

In 1882, under the Ancient Monuments Protection Act, Newgrange and the nearby monuments of Knowth and Dowth were placed under the control of the state with the Board of Public Works being the responsible administrative authority. In 1890, under the leadership of Thomas Newenham Deane, the board began a project to conserve the monument. It had been damaged through general deterioration over the previous three millennia as well as the increasing vandalism caused by visitors, some of whom had inscribed their names on the stones. In subsequent decades, several archaeologists performed excavations at the site, discovering more about its function and how it had been built; however, even at the time, it was still mistakenly believed by archaeologists to have been built during the Bronze Age rather than during the earlier Neolithic period. For 60 years in the late nineteenth and early twentieth centuries, Annie (d. 1964) and Bob Hickey looked after Newgrange as caretakers, custodians and tour guides following his appointment c. 1890. They spoke of noticing a shaft of sunlight hitting a particular stone inside during the winter solstice in December. In the 1950s, electric lighting was installed in the passageway to allow visitors to see more clearly.

The first thorough archaeological investigation and excavation of Newgrange was undertaken from 1962 through to 1975, led by Irish archaeologist Michael J. O'Kelly. Following the O'Kelly excavation, conservation, restoration and reconstruction works took place, based on the archaeological findings. His excavation report was published in 1982 by Thames and Hudson as Newgrange: Archaeology, Art and Legend.

A dense layer of white quartz stones, mingled with grey cobbles, was found lying at the front of the mound. O'Kelly's team carefully recorded the stratigraphy. The quartz layer was thickest nearest the kerbstones, and none was found beneath any of the kerbstones that had fallen or tilted outward from the mound. This indicated that the quartz had fallen or slipped down from above the kerbstones. O'Kelly concluded that the quartz had made up a white façade or revetment on the front of the monument. The archaeologists also found what they believed to be the bottom course of a revetment, still in place above three kerbstones at the back of the mound. The height of the original façade was calculated as being up to 3 meters tall by civil engineer John Fogarty of University College Cork, an expert on the movement of piled-up loose materials. Fogarty and O'Kelly's team tested their theory by building and collapsing a façade made of the same kind of quartz and cobble stones. O'Kelly wrote that the resulting stratigraphy was almost identical to that found in the excavations.

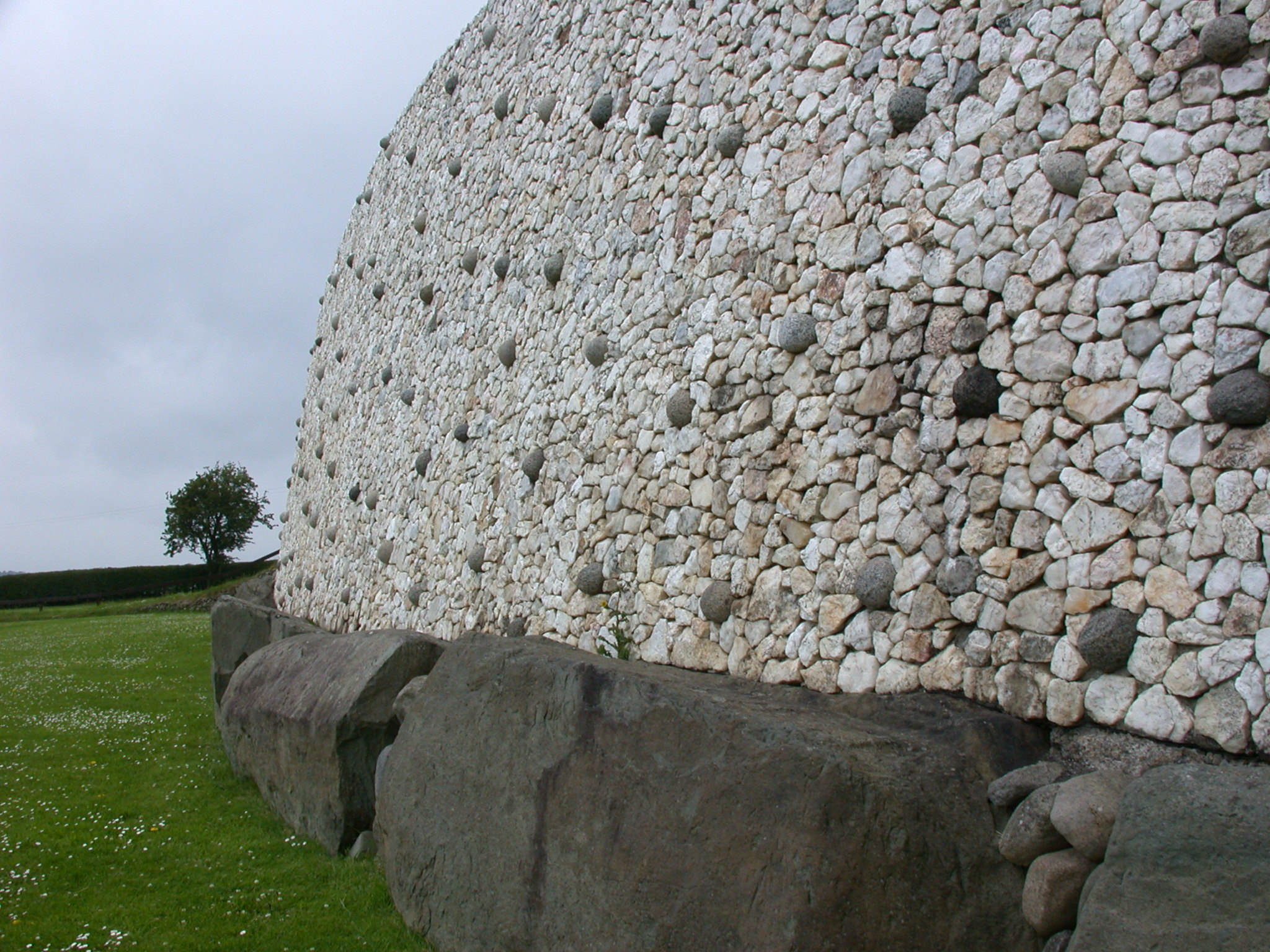
Closeup of the façade or revetment

As part of the restoration, this white quartz façade was rebuilt, and a concrete support wall built behind it in case of a future cairn collapse. This work is controversial among the archaeological community. P. R. Giot described the façade as looking like a "cream cheese cake with dried currants distributed about". Neil Oliver described the reconstruction as "a bit brutal, a bit overdone, kind of like Stalin does the Stone Age". Some critics claim that the Neolithic builders didn't have the technology to construct a revetment at this angle.

The concrete support wall built behind the reconstruction front façade resulted in unexpected damage at the back of Newgrange. The concrete wall has weep holes for draining the rainwater within the mound. However, these holes were blocked up within a decade, causing a massive buildup of water in the mound, and the rainwater began to flow towards the back of the mound. In the early 1980s, due to the increased water pressure, sections of the nineteenth-century revetment wall along the north side of the mound had collapsed. The loose soil and cairn stones also collapsed, pushing some of the kerbstones over. The Irish National Monuments Service had to close the back of the mound to the public and reinforce the cairn with gabions and concrete. Further excavation and conservation of the mound took place between 1984 and 1988 under the direction of Ann Lynch.

Dr. Michael Ryan, archaeologist and museum curator, wrote of O'Kelly's theories and the monument in the journal Museum Ireland in 1995:

An example is Newgrange where the modern excavations were undertaken mainly because visitors' shoulders were rubbing away the carvings of the passage. Valuable information came to light in the work and the excavator, Brian O'Kelly, developed an elaborate theory - which has proved contentious about how the mound originally looked. So the tumulus was reconstructed to reflect this highly individual approach. An academic theory must have years of objective testing and a very wide measure of consent before it can be used to justify massive alterations to a well-loved and immensely important monument. Here is a case where the presentation of a monument might be better served by being less in the vanguard of scientific explanation. In addition, to bring groups in and out, a semi-circular forecourt was constructed behind the entrance stone which unfortunately mimics a feature of related megalithic monuments - one which never existed at Newgrange.

Other archaeologists have supported O'Kelly's conclusions and the reconstructed façade, such as Robert Hensey and Elizabeth Shee Twohig in their paper "Facing the cairn at Newgrange" (2017), where they set forth the archaeological evidence. They also contend that if the builders quarried and brought the quartz such a distance, they likely would have used it to "maximum effect" as a striking façade, rather than laying it on the ground where it could barely be seen. Along with archaeologist Carleton Jones, Hensey and Twohig note that passage tombs in Brittany have similar near-vertical dry stone fronts, such as Gavrinis and Barnenez.

The inward-curving dark stone walls on each side of the entrance are not original, nor are they meant to suggest Newgrange's original appearance. They were designed solely to facilitate visitor access. One visitor guide book to the site, however, mistakenly had a drawing showing the modern entrance as if it were part of Newgrange's original appearance.

In 2016, archaeologist Michael Gibbons controversially claimed that the roofbox, which captures the winter solstice sunlight, was "fabricated" by O'Kelly's team. This claim was refuted by several prominent Irish archaeologists, including Prof William O'Brien and Ann Lynch, who noted that it has been recorded photographically since the early 1900s, and in detailed site drawings from the excavation.

== Access ==
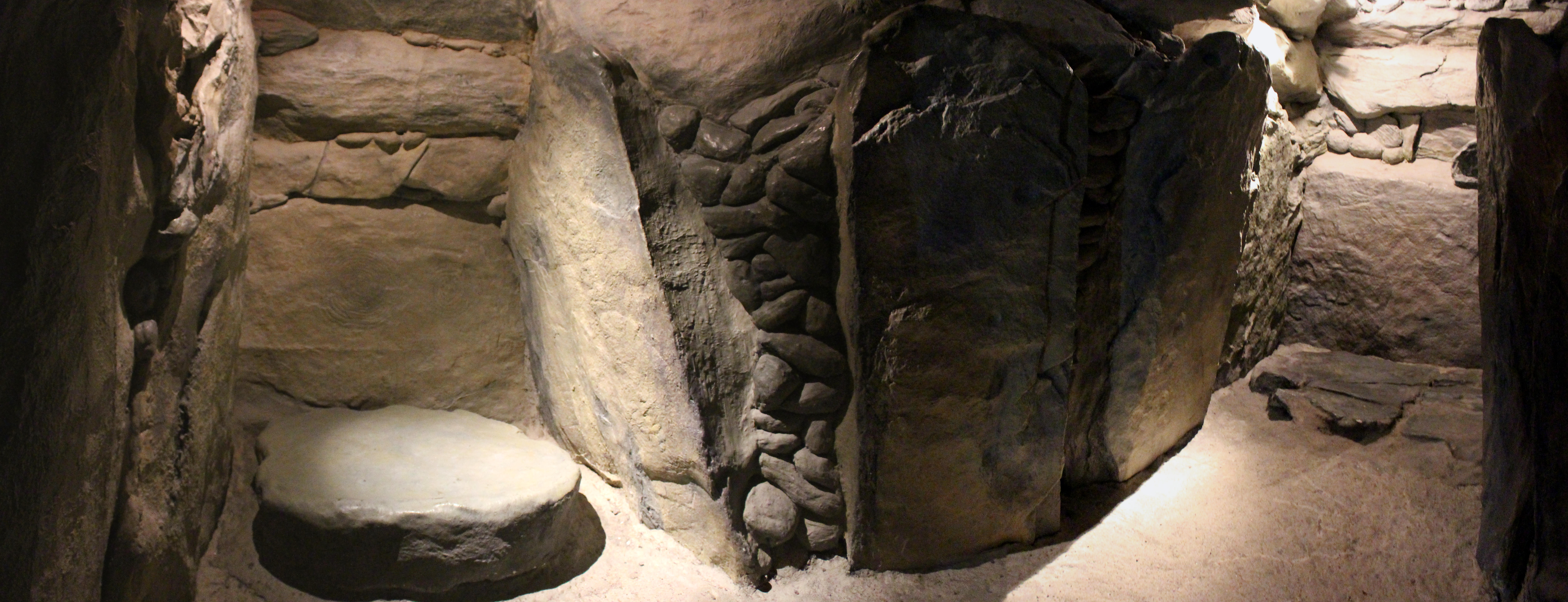
Mock-up of the chamber, in the Brú na Bóinne Visitor Centre

Newgrange is 8.4 kilometres (5.2 mi) west of Drogheda in County Meath. The interpretive centre is on the south bank of the river, and Newgrange is on its north side. Access is only from the interpretive centre, by guided tour only. Tours begin at the Brú na Bóinne Visitor Centre, from which visitors are taken to the site in groups. Visitors to Newgrange are treated to a guided tour and a re-enactment of the Winter Solstice experience through the use of high-powered electric lights situated within the tomb. The finale of a Newgrange tour results in every visitor standing inside the tomb where the tour guide then turns off the lights, and then turns on ones simulating the sunlight that would appear on the winter solstice.

To experience the phenomenon on the morning of the Winter Solstice from inside Newgrange, visitors to Bru Na Bóinne Visitor Centre must enter an annual lottery at the centre. Of the tens of thousands who enter, sixty are chosen each year. Winners are permitted to bring a single guest. The winners are split into groups of ten and taken in on the five days around the solstice in December when sunlight can enter the chamber, weather permitting. Due to the COVID-19 pandemic, however, the 2020 and 2021 events were exclusively live-streamed with no public access.

== Gallery ==
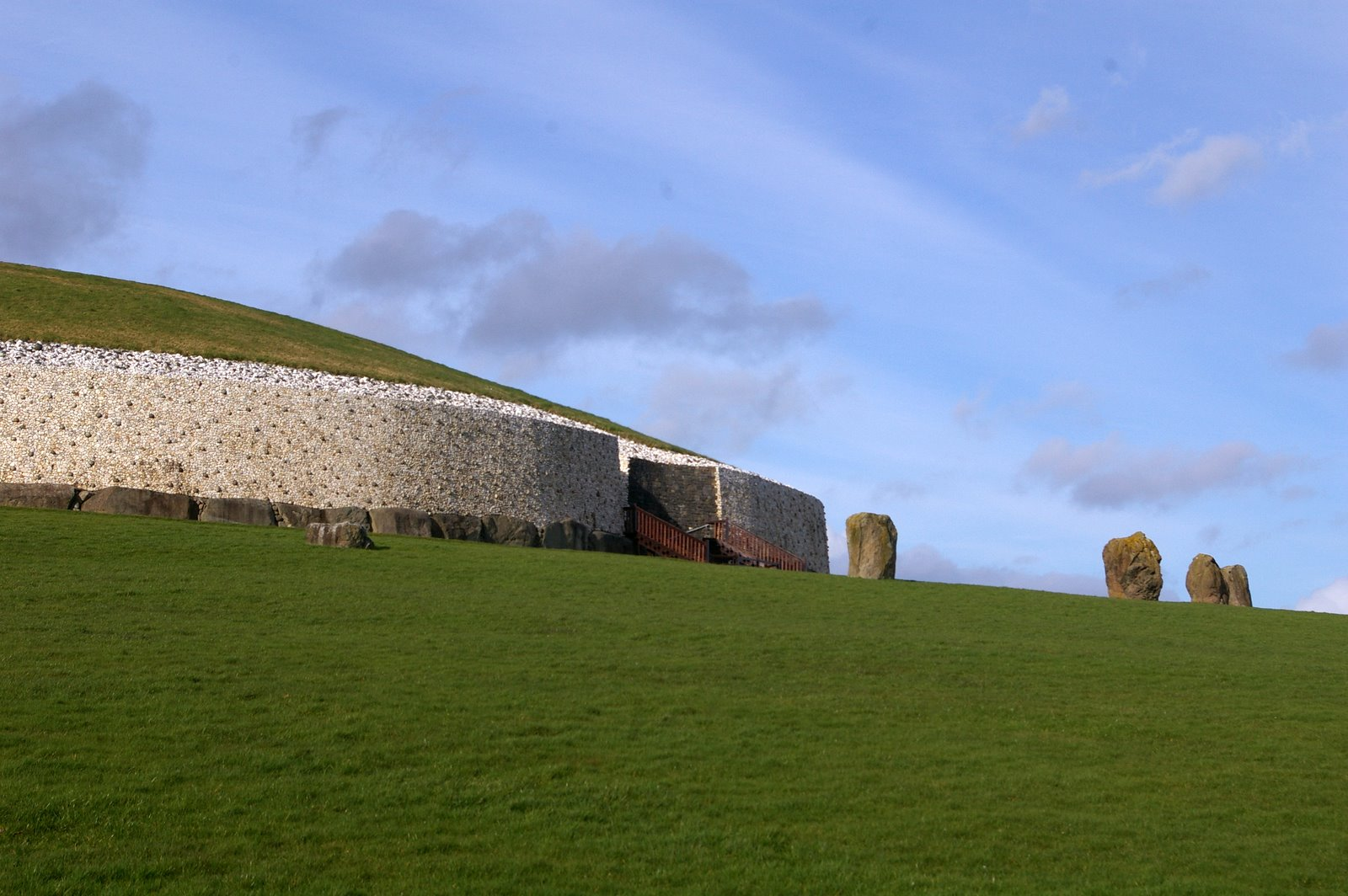
Side view

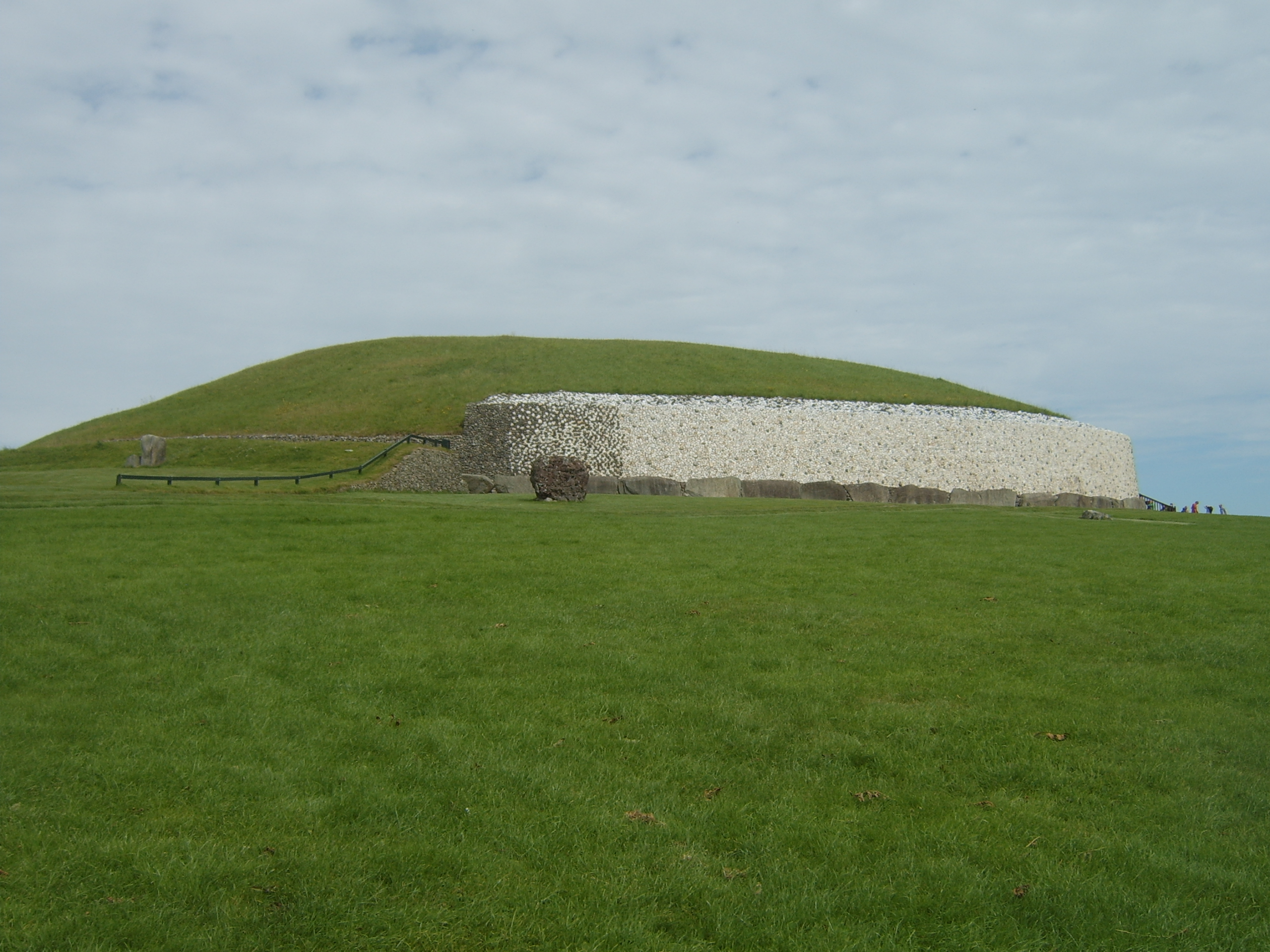
Side view looking east

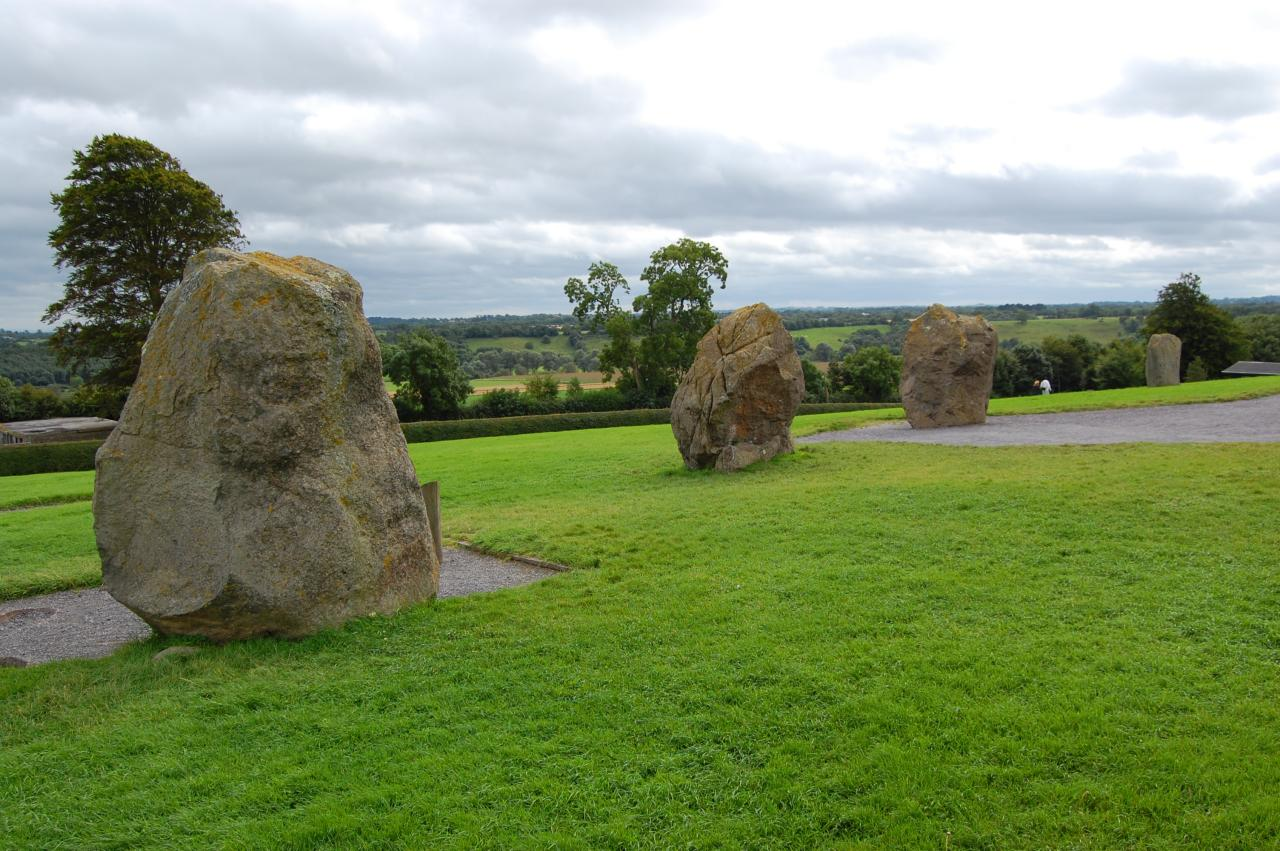
Standing stones at entrance

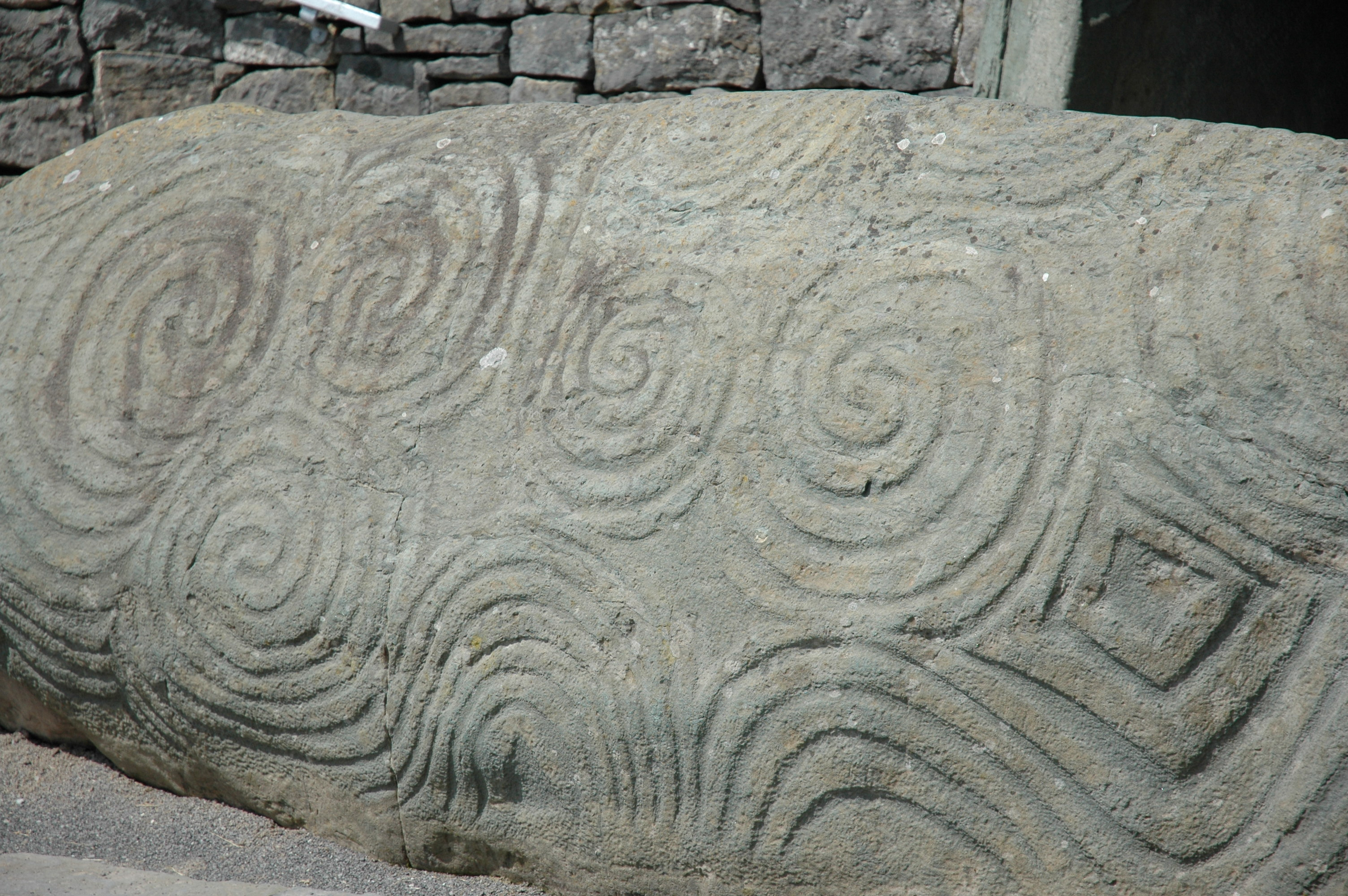
Detail of entrance stone

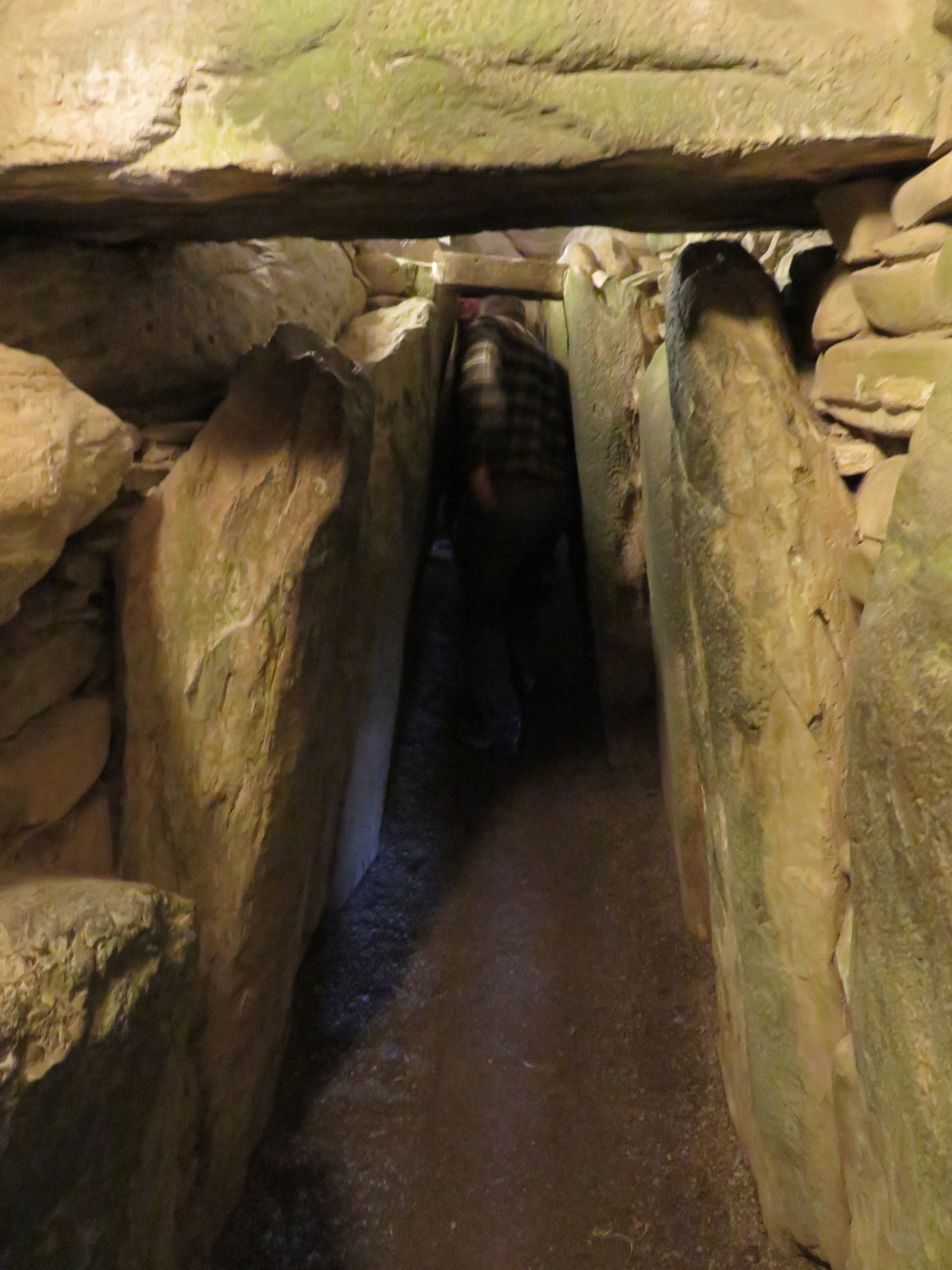
Orthostat-lined passage leading towards tomb chamber

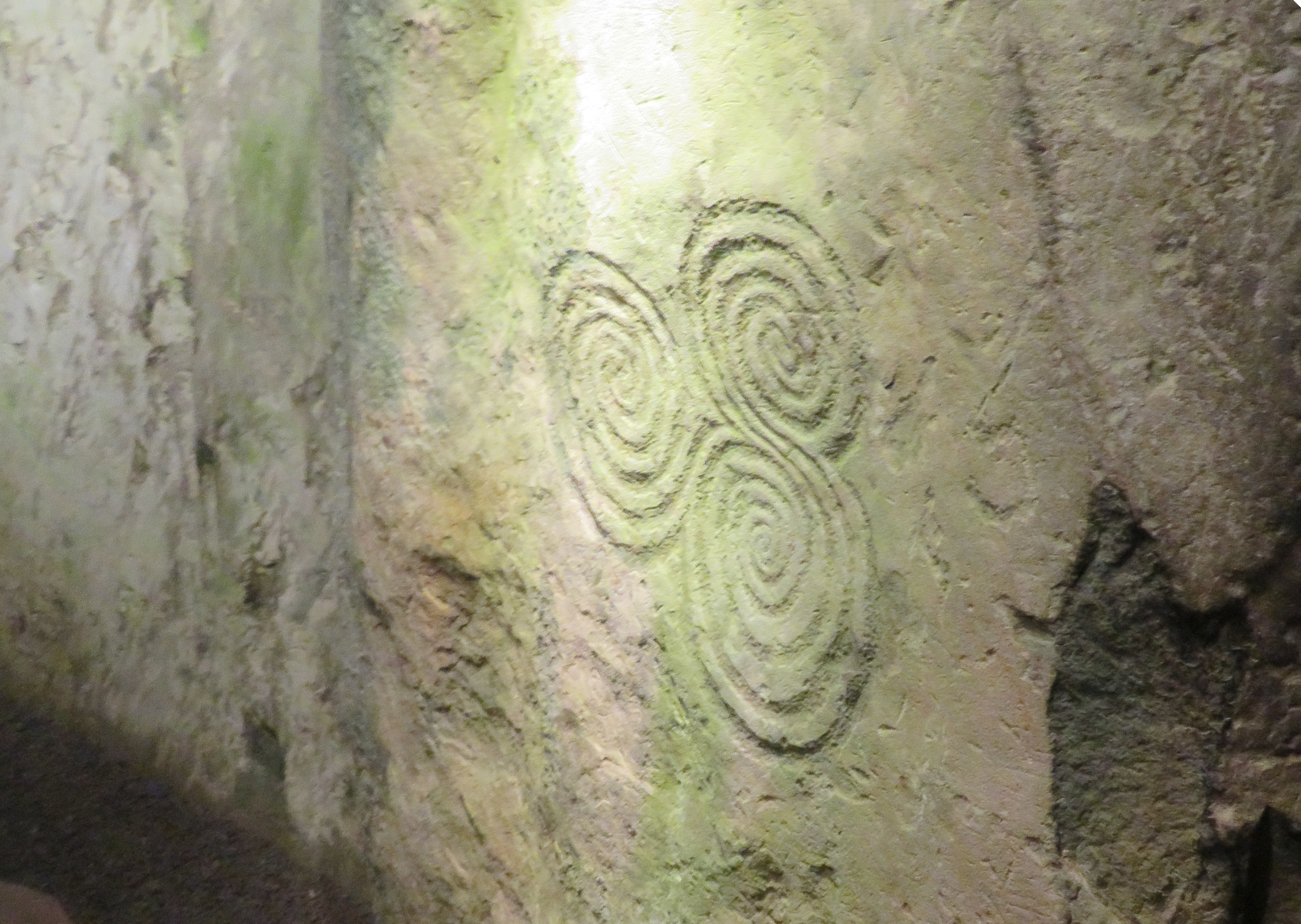
Triskele (triple spiral) pattern on orthostat C10 in the end-chamber

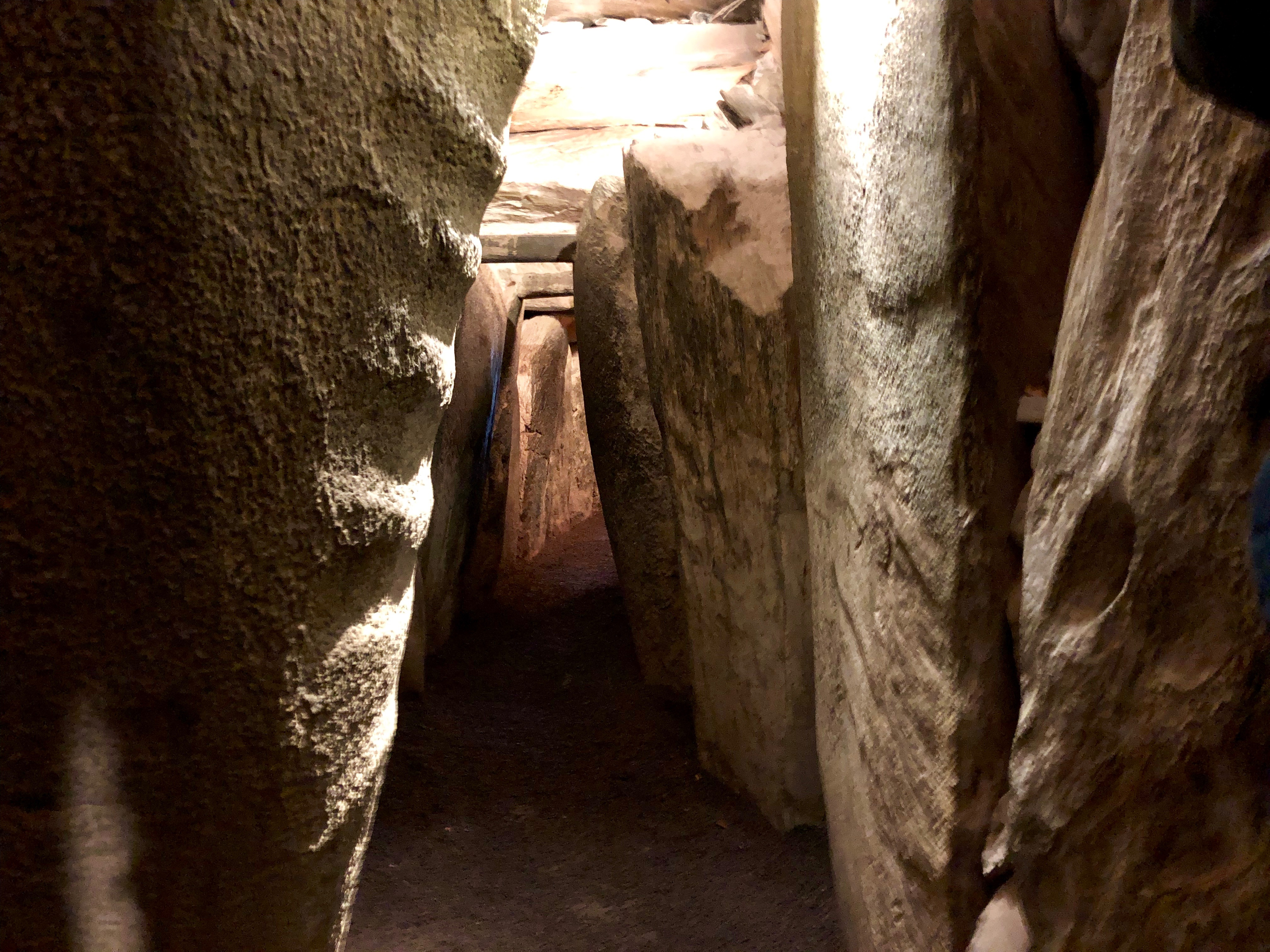
Passageway showing grooved stone

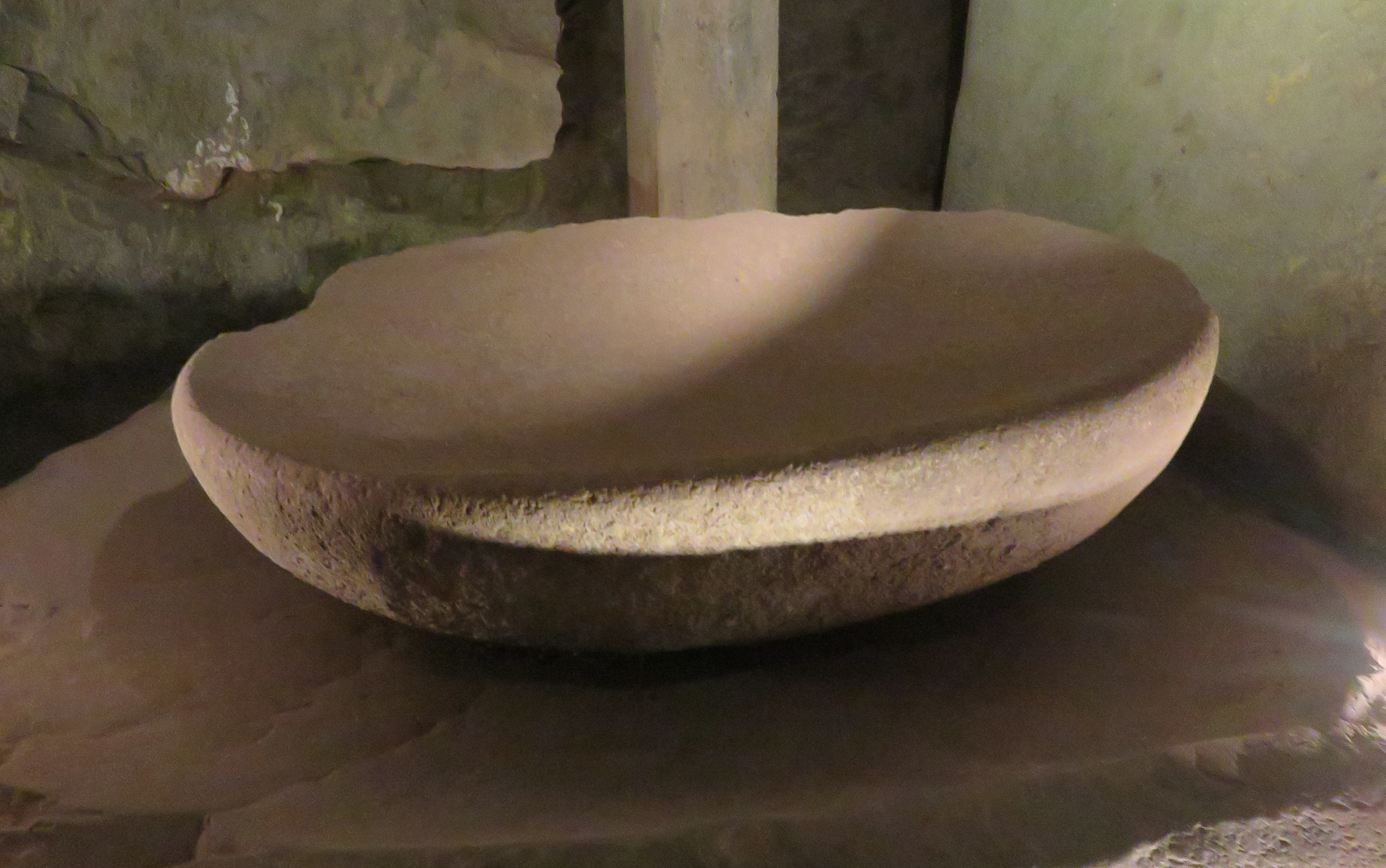
A chiselled granite basin in the east side-chamber

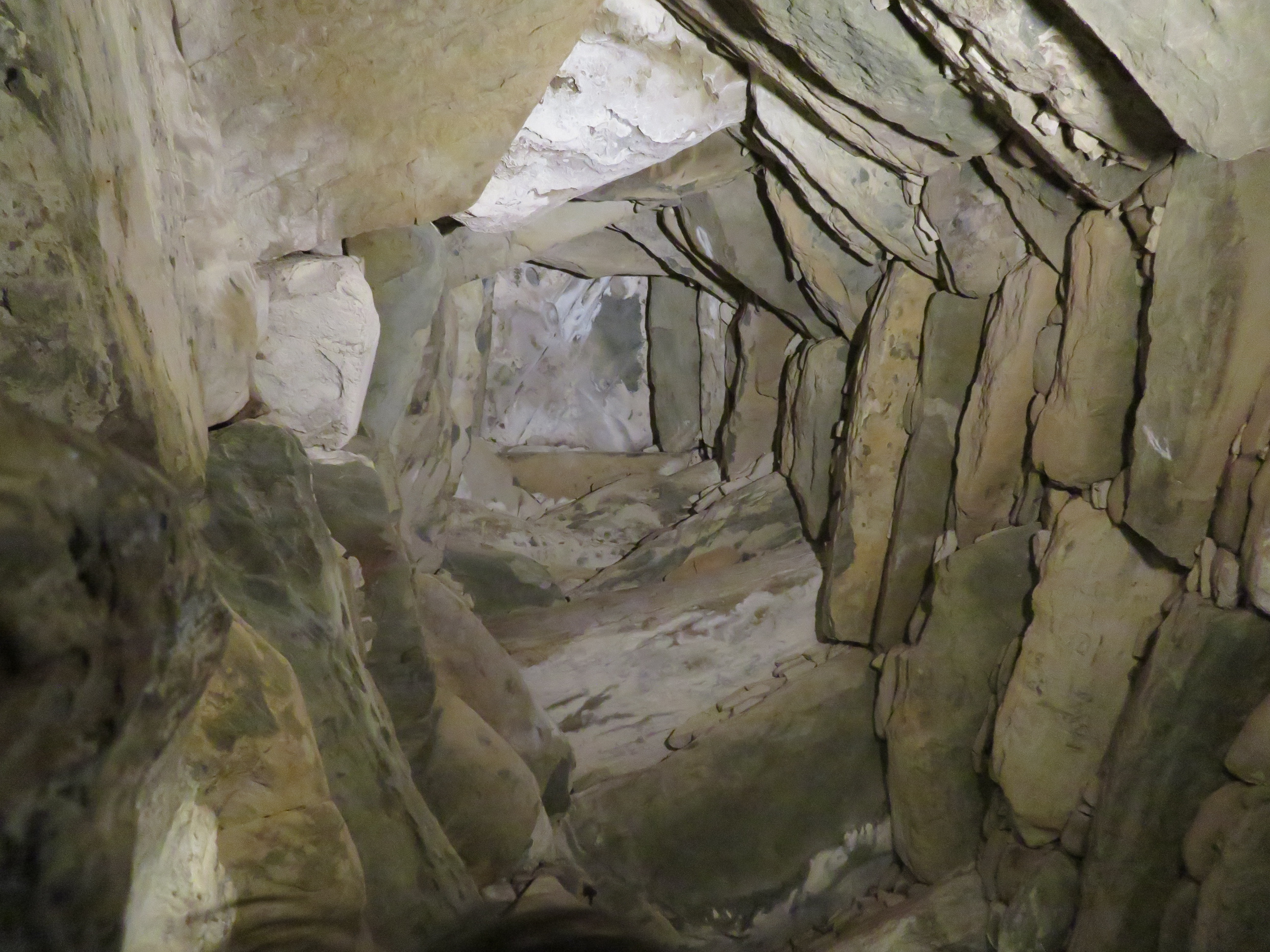
Looking up to the corbelled ceiling of end-chamber

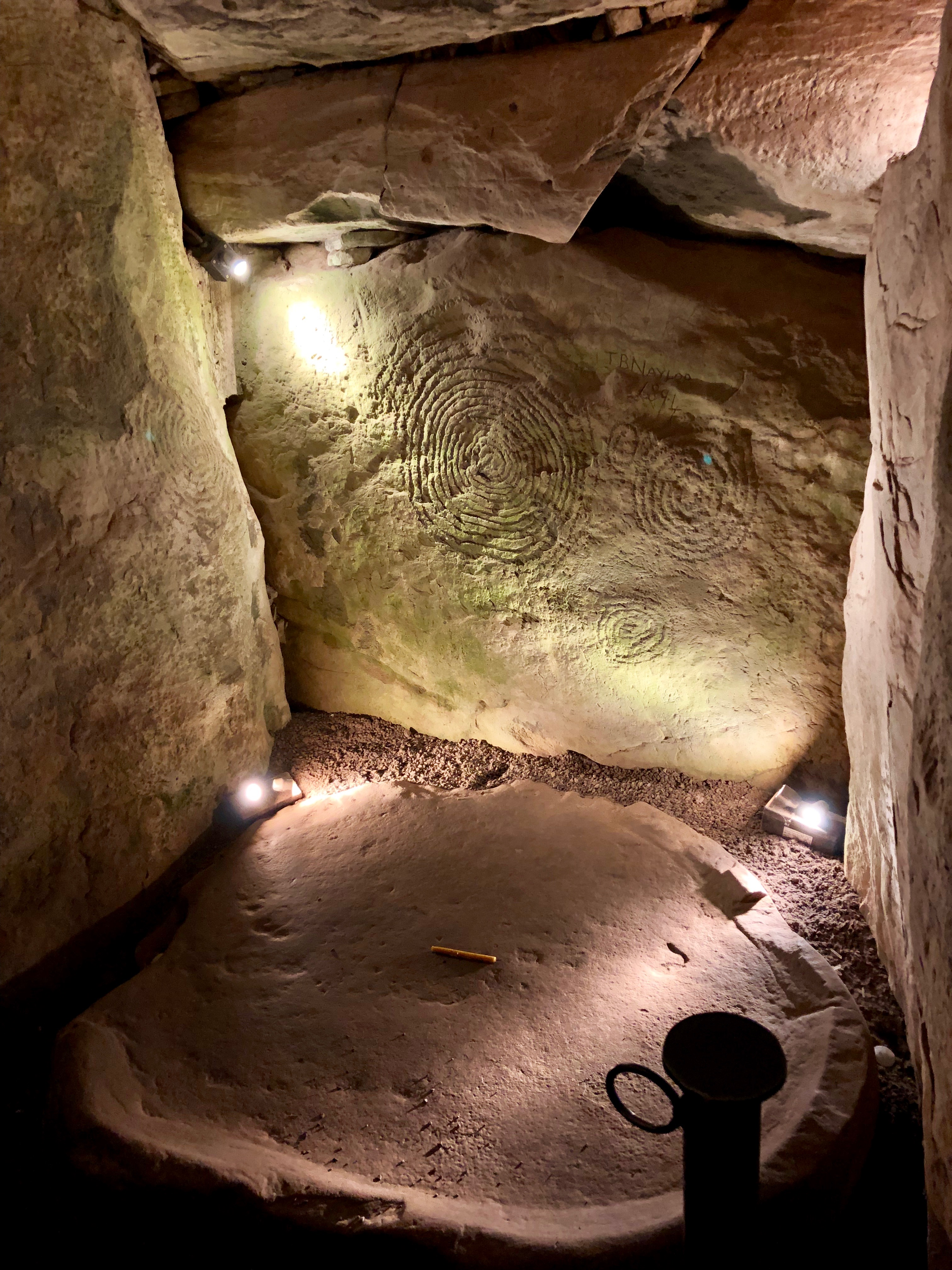
Spiral carving on stone in inner alcove

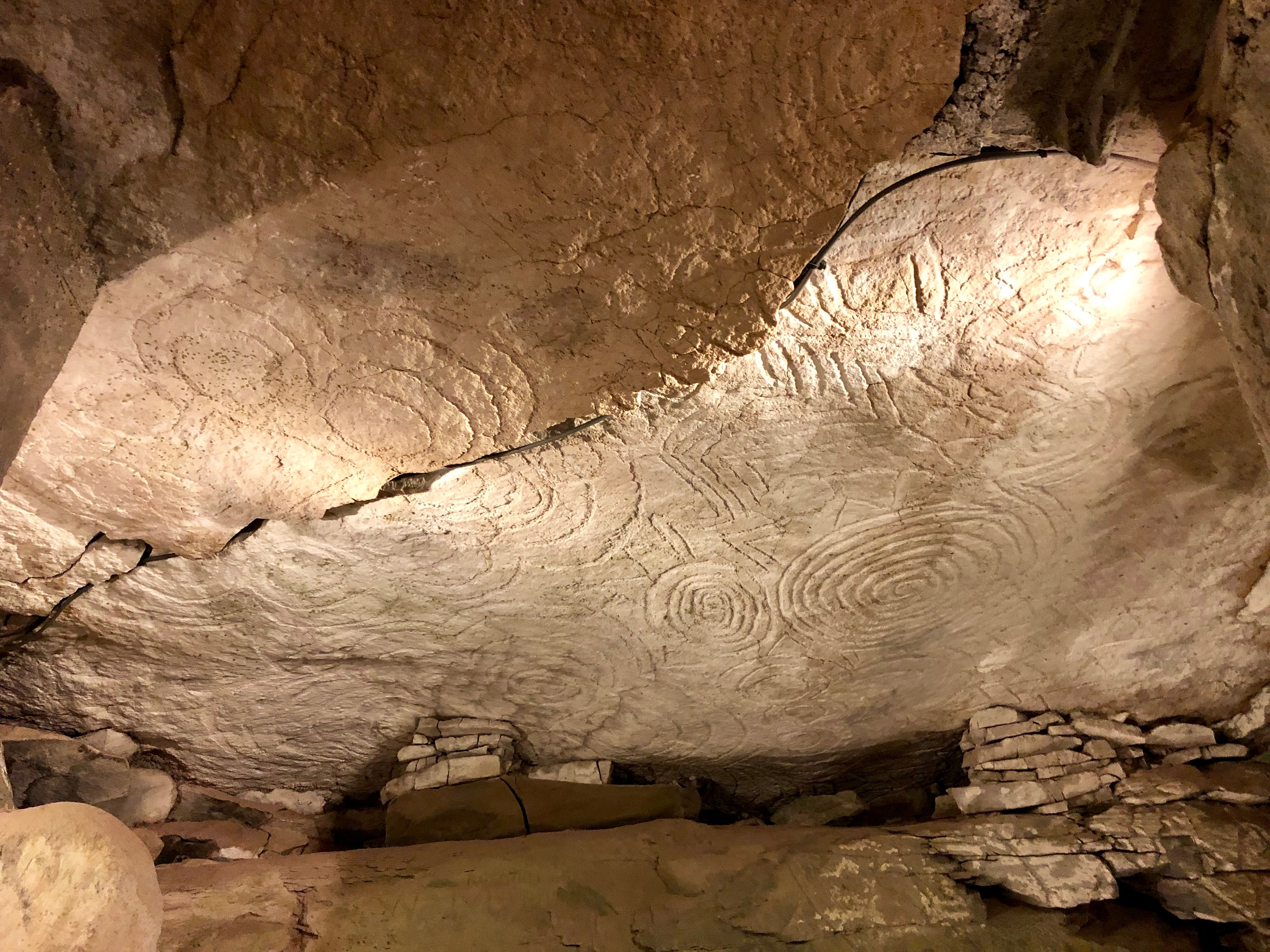
Spiral and lozenge art on stone in passageway

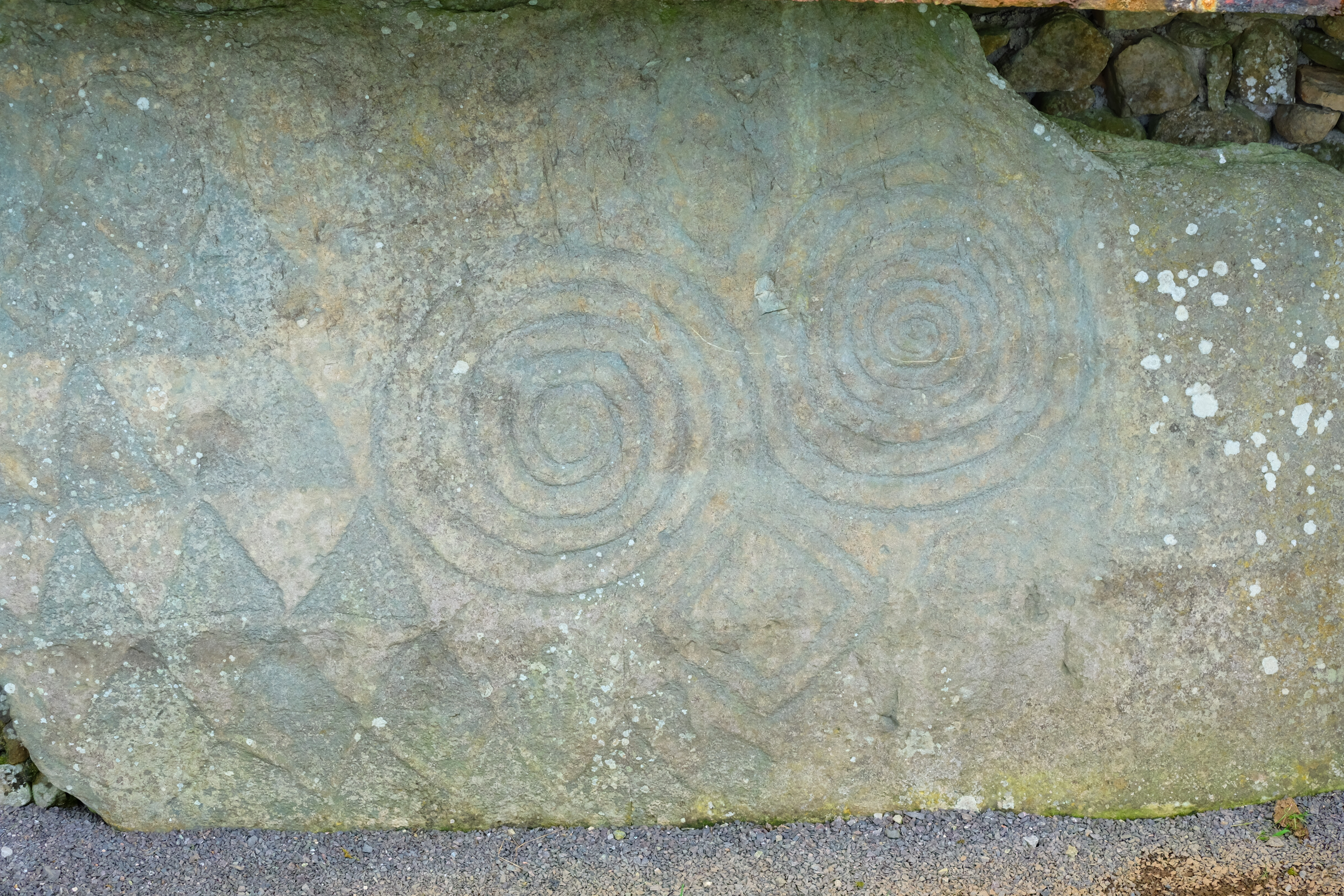
Spiral and Lozenge shapes on outer kerbstone

== See also ==
- Neolithic British Isles
- Prehistoric Ireland
