= Ann Lynch (archaeologist) =

Irish archaeologist

Ann Lynch is an Irish archaeologist specialising in prehistory. She is a former Chief Archaeologist with the National Monuments Service of Ireland.

Lynch studied at University College Cork and has led excavations on a number of major national monuments, including Poulnabrone dolmen (1986 & 1988), Newgrange (1980s), Skellig Michael (from the mid-1980s), Dublin Castle (1985), and Moor Abbey, County Tipperary (2019).

== Selected publications ==
=== Books ===
- "Dublin Castle: From Fortress to Palace Volume 2". Wordwell, 2023. ISBN 978-1-4468-8071-5
- "Poulnabrone: An Early Neolithic Portal Tomb in Ireland". Stationery Office, 2014. ISBN 978-1-4064-2817-9
- "Tintern Abbey, Co. Wexford". Stationery Office, 2010. ISBN 978-1-4064-2532-1

=== Journals ===
- "Reviewing the state of archaeology in Ireland". The National Monuments Service, volume 22, nr 2, 2008. pp. 10–12

=== Online lectures ===
- Poulnabrone, a tomb for the ancestors. Burrenbeo Trust, 2022

== Sources ==
- O'Kelly, Michael J. "Early Ireland: An Introduction to Irish Prehistory". Cambridge University Press, 1989. ISBN 978-0521334891
