= Poulnabrone dolmen =

Dolmen in the Burren, County Clare, Ireland

- Poll na Brón
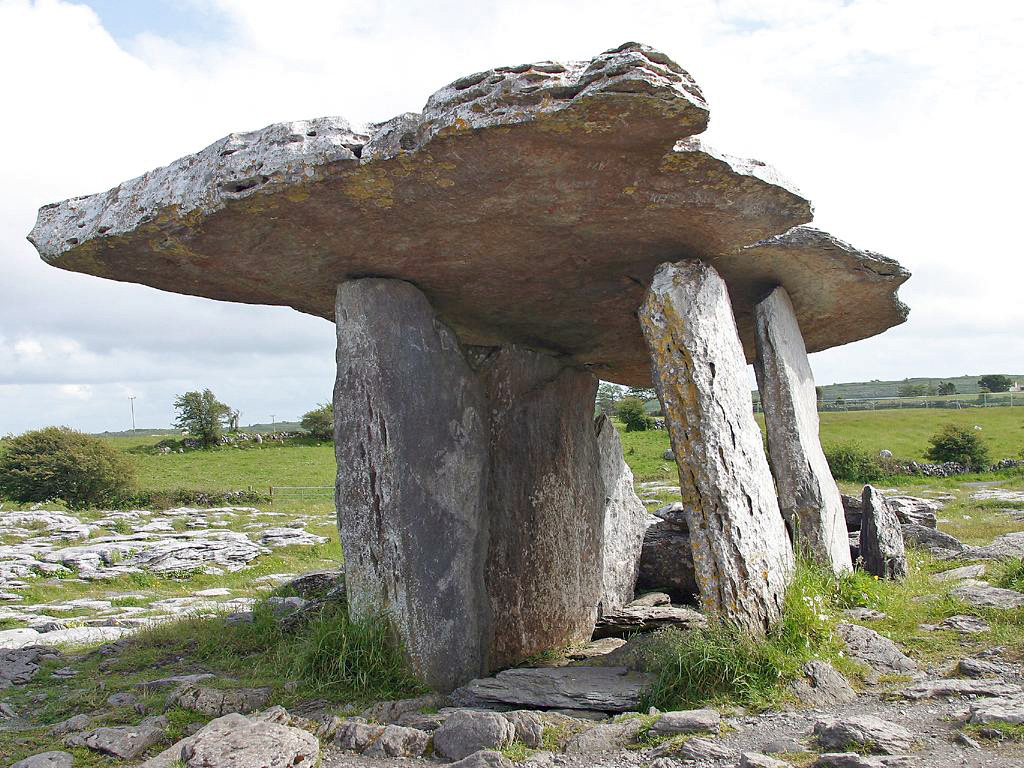
- The dolmen in 2006
- Interactive map of Poulnabrone dolmen
- 53°02′55″N 9°08′24″W
- Type: Portal tomb
- Periods: Neolithic
- Location: Kilcorney, County Clare, the Burren
- Region: Ireland

History
- Built: c. 3500 BC

Site notes
- Material: Limestone
- Excavation dates: 1986, 1988
- Archaeologists: Ann Lynch
- Condition: Good
- Owner: Public
- Public access: Yes

National monument of Ireland
- Official name: Poulnabrone
- Reference no.: 632

Poulnabrone dolmen (Irish: Poll na Brón, lit. 'Hole of the Quernstone') is a large dolmen (or cromlech, a type of single-chamber portal tomb) located in the Burren, County Clare, Ireland. Situated on one of the region's most desolate and highest points, it comprises three standing portal stones supporting a heavy horizontal capstone and dates to the early Neolithic period, with estimates from 3800 and 3200 BC. Although not the largest, it is the best known of the approximately 172 dolmens in Ireland.

It was constructed on a unique karst landscape formed from limestone laid down around 350 million years ago. The dolmen was built by Neolithic farmers, choosing the location either for ritual, as a territorial marker, or as a collective burial site. What remains today is only the "stone skeleton" of the original monument; originally, it would have been covered with soil, and its flagstone capped by a cairn.

When the site was excavated in 1986 and again in 1988, around 33 human remains, including those of adults and children (including the remains of a much later Bronze Age infant), were found buried underneath it. Researchers also discovered various stone and bone objects that would have been placed with the dead at the time of interment. The human remains and objects are estimated to have been buried intermittently during the 600-year period between 3800 and 3200 BC.

== Name ==
Poulnabrone is an English phonetic transcription of the Irish Poll na Brón. Brón is the genitive case of the Irish word bró, meaning quern, so the name means "Hole (or Pool) of the Quernstone". It is sometimes translated as "Hole of Sorrows" (Poll na mBrón).

== Origin and purpose ==
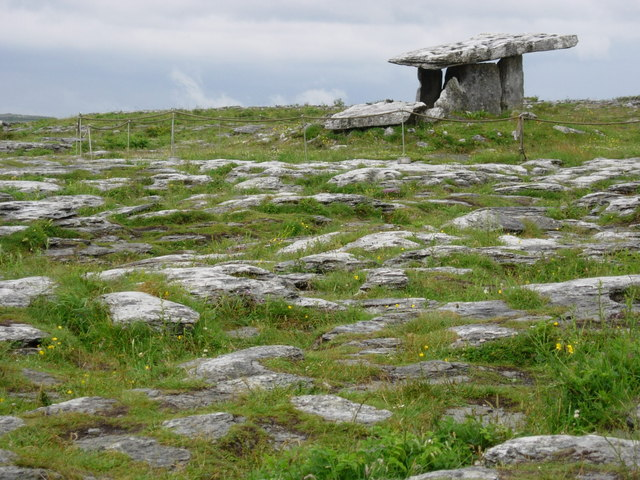
View with karst limestone pavement in foreground

Poulnabrone dolmen is located on a low circular mound measuring c. 10 m (33 ft) in diameter. The site is east of the Poulanine and Glensleade valleys, beyond which are the rocky Baur and Poulnabrucky hills. From about 54 m (177 ft) north-east of the site the land rises into rough and uneven rocky terraces. The location would have been difficult of access at the time it was built, and it was probably used as a center for ritual into the Bronze Age.

The monument may have also served as a territorial marker in the Neolithic landscape, in a position visible from all around and close to the important north-south route from Ballyvaughan Bay south to the region where Kilnaboy village now stands. The local settlers may have erected the dolmen to delimit the northern border of their territory, and later used it for burials for successive generations.

Unusually for an Irish dolmen, but typical of those found in County Clare, the capstone slopes upward towards the west.

== Description ==
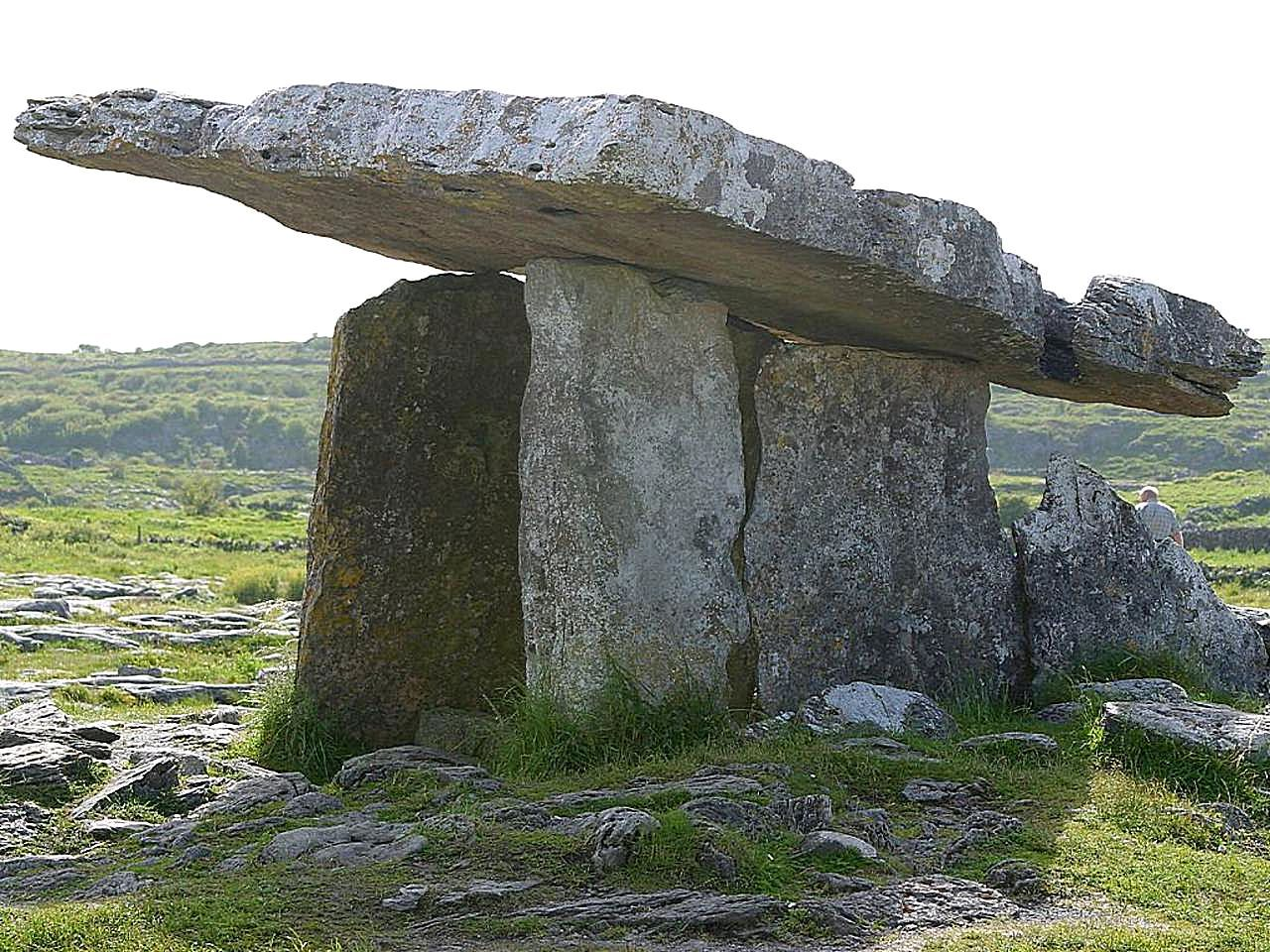
View from the south-side, with a portal stone at the right (east-facing side)

Poulnabrone dolmen consists of a slab-like tabular capstone (or table-stone) supported by two pillar stones on either side, which create a chamber that tapers eastwards. Two portal stones at its lower end mark the tomb's entrance.

The trapezoidal capstone is 3.9 m (13 ft) in length, between 2 m (6 ft 7 in) (min) and 3 m (9.8 ft) (max) wide, and is 0.3 m (1 ft 0 in) thick. It is supported by two pairs of stones on the north and south sides; a number of others have fallen over the millennia. The capstone and north and south pillars form a chamber which is 2.8 m (9 ft 2 in) long, and tapers eastwards due to the relative height of the supporting stones. These side stones are fixed directly on the limestone bedrock, and thus would have been no higher during the Neolithic period.

The portal stones are positioned at either side of the lower side of the capstone, marking the tomb's entrance. A threshold stone (or sill) stone lies transverse on an east-west crevice in front of them.

The cairn extends an average of 3 m (9.8 ft) from the chamber.

Radiocarbon dating indicates that the tomb was probably used as a burial site between 3800 and 3200 BC. The findings are now at the Clare Museum, Ennis, loaned from the National Museum of Ireland.

Poulnabrone is the largest Irish portal tomb after Brownshill Dolmen in County Carlow.

== Excavations ==
A crack at the base of the eastern portal stone was noticed during a survey in the 1950s. By the early 1980s, it had grown to the extent that it was thought likely to destabilise the tomb. Two phases of conservation were undertaken in 1986 and 1988, and were overseen by Ann Lynch, Senior Archaeologist at the National Monuments Service.

At the time of the first excavation, the dolmen was on private land. To carry out the excavation, it was taken into the guardianship of the Irish state in 1986. The 1986 excavation focused on the chamber and cairn. The priority was to raise the capstone so as to relieve pressure on the damaged portal. This was achieved by constructing a pyramidal wooden scaffolding that protected the archaeologists working underneath the capstone and provided leverage to raise it enough for them to work on the portal stone and fully excavate the chamber.

During the excavations, the remains of around 33 people were found buried within the chamber. In addition, items such as pottery, a stone axe, jewellery made from bone and quartz crystals, and weapons were found buried in various locations.

=== Human remains ===
The human remains were analysed by Dr Barra O'Donnabhain (University College Cork) and Dr Mara Tesorieri and from a total of some 6,000 bone fragments, the remains of a minimum of 28, but more likely around 36 people, were found buried within the monument. Although it was usually difficult—or impossible—to distinguish the remains of each individual, Lynch estimates that at least 17 were adolescent or younger, while there was roughly an equal amount of males and females. 4,169 bones are identifiable to specific human bone types, while a further 486 are loose teeth. All but one of the identified adults were under 30. They lived between 3800 and 3200 BC, and can be assumed to have been members of successive generations of a specific Neolithic community.

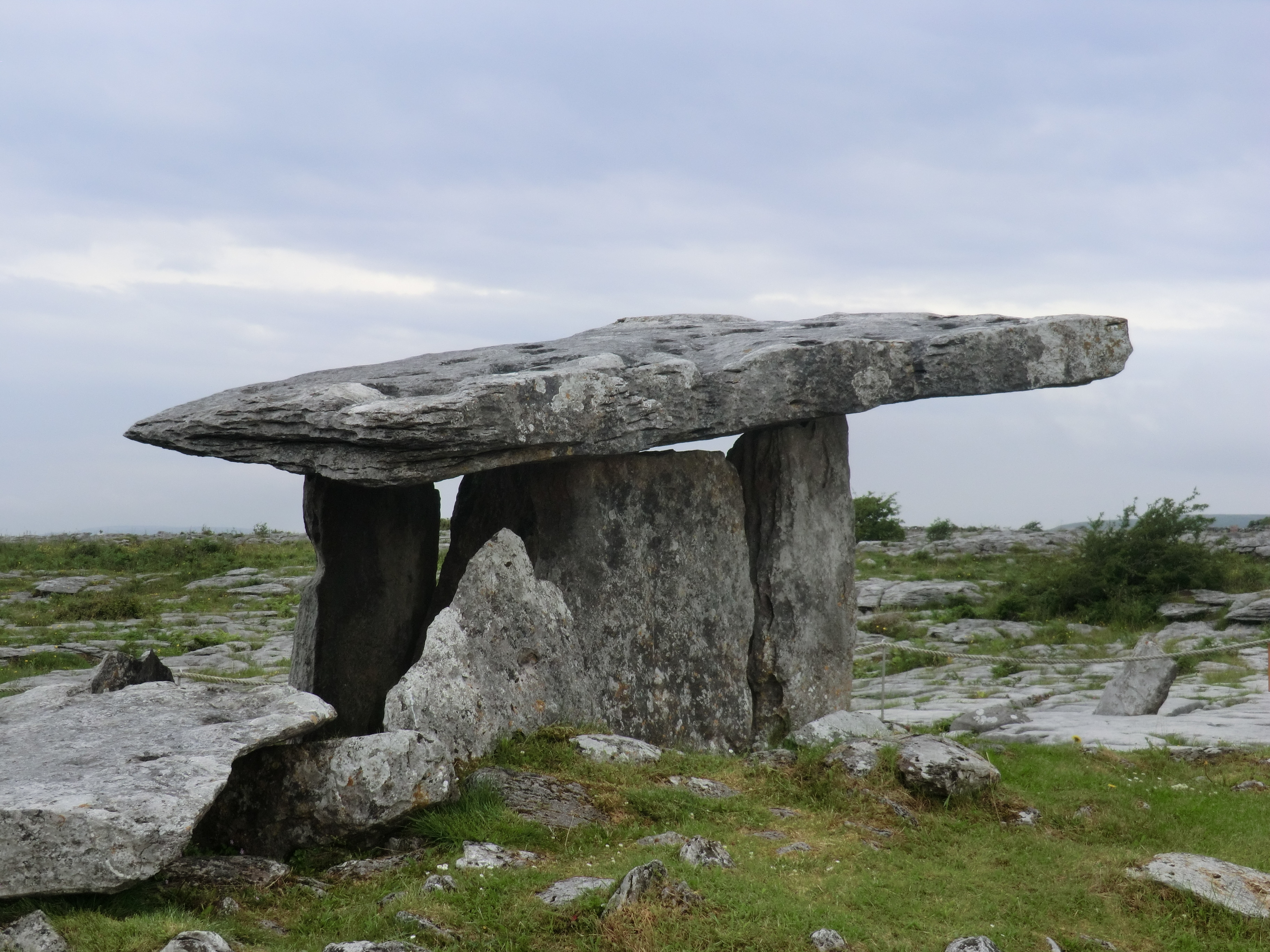
Another view of the dolmen

In most cases, the pathology and physical condition of the remains indicated lives spent in hard physical labour, and a lifespan that ended before the age of 30. Only one individual seems to have survived past 40 years. Wear on the chest and chest vertebra of some individuals indicates the carrying of heavy loads on the head and back. Many of the bones showed signs of arthritis in the upper body, and the children's teeth showed evidence of illness and malnutrition. Dental pathology, including the wearing of the upper front teeth, indicates that they had a relatively abrasive and mostly plant-based diet, with limited consumption of animal protein.

The remains of two of the bodies contain signs of violent injuries. The left parietal lobe of a young or middle-aged male's skull contains an oval depressed lesion sustained from the impact of a small blunt object. Because of the position of the wound towards the top of the head, it is more likely the result of a projectile rather than a fall, possibly from a Sling_(weapon). The wound appears fully healed, with no signs of infection. The right hip bone of another individual contains the tip of a triangular stone projectile, which seems to have been shot from behind. Although the wound itself would not have been fatal; because it did not heal, it is assumed that the person incurred other fatal injuries during the same incident.

The remains of a six-month-old baby with Down syndrome were found at the megalith. This is thought to be the earliest discovered case of Down Syndrome. There was evidence that the infant had been breastfed prior to their death.

Some bodies had been left elsewhere to decompose—likely in a protected location, as none show any signs of animal teeth marks. Some show scorch marks, suggesting they may have been ritually burned beforehand.

Sometime between c. 1750 and 1420 BC (corresponding with the Irish Bronze Age), an infant was buried just outside the entrance.

=== Pottery and artefacts ===
Most of the pottery was discovered within the main chamber, with smaller finds in the portico and cairn. All of the pieces are badly disintegrated and very small; according to archaeologist Anne Brindley, they consist of "crumbs or fragments", and it is not possible to determine how many original objects they come from. Although few of the remnants have distinguishing characteristics, some of the pottery fragments have been identified as within the early Western Neolithic tradition (c. 3750–3600 BC), largely based on the type of paste, and a few pieces with partially intact rims or decorations.

== Tourism and preservation ==
The site is relatively unblemished, despite being a popular tourist attraction.

A large car park was opened in 2007 by Clare County Council to address traffic problems caused by cars or coaches parking on the narrow road, guided by a 2005 estimate that put the number of annual visitors at 200,000. In 2007, tension arose when Lynch requested that visitor facilities should be reduced to preserve "the spiritual quality of the landscape surrounding the tomb."
