= Listoghil =

- Lios an tSeagail (Irish)
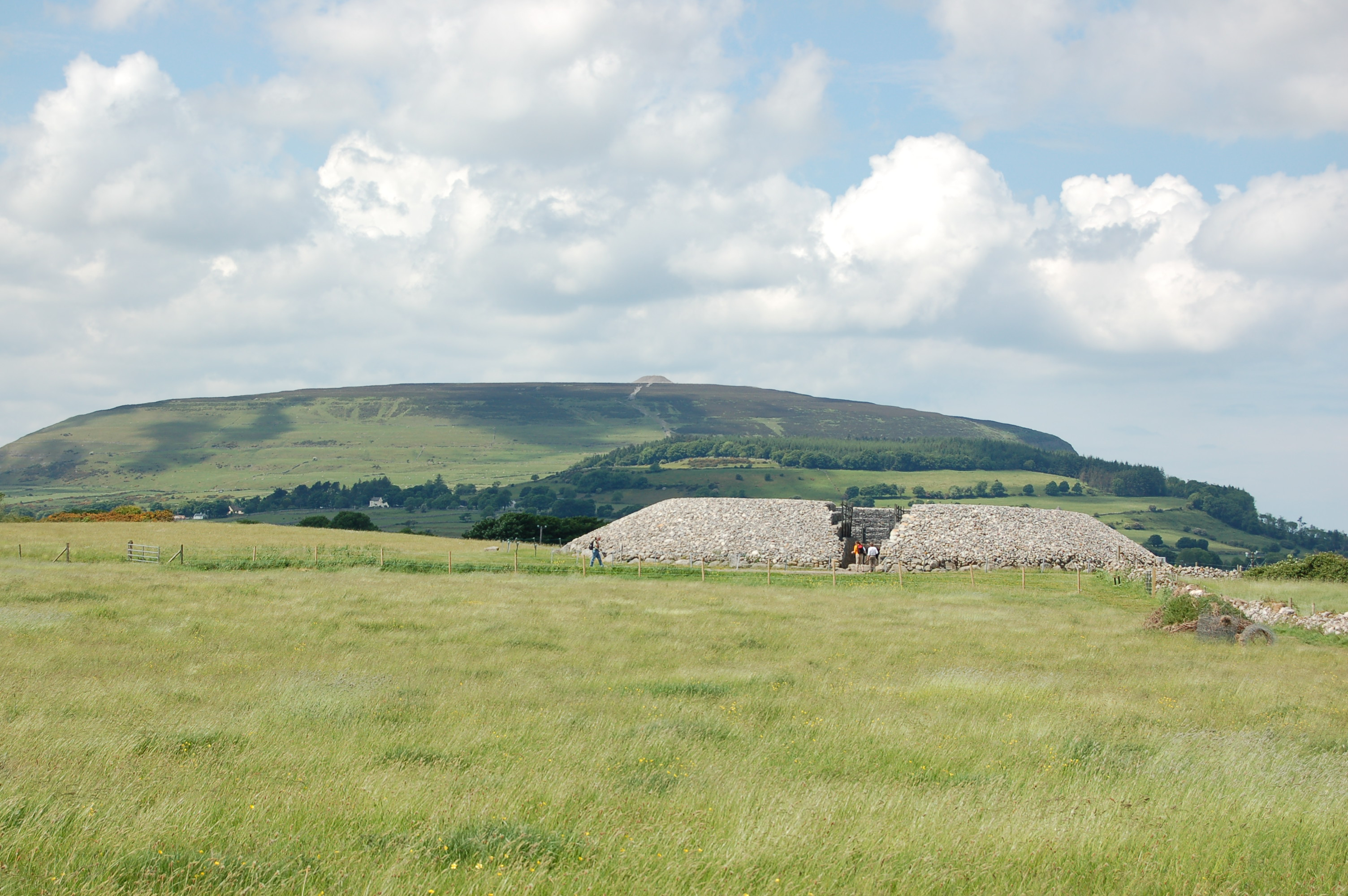
- The monument in 2008

- Location in Ireland
- 54°14′56″N 8°31′07″W
- Location: County Sligo, Ireland

History
- Built: c. 3500 BC

Site notes
- Height: 4 m (13 ft)

Listoghil (Irish: Lios an tSeagail) is the large central monument in the Carrowmore group of prehistoric tombs in County Sligo, Ireland. The Carrowmore group consists of about 35 monuments surrounding Listoghil. It was numbered as Carrowmore 51 by George Petrie in 1837 and this designation is still used. Although the district of Cúil Iorra is steeped in legend, Listoghil has never been satisfactorily connected with the ancient legends in the way that say Newgrange has. It is the only cairn in Carrowmore. Antiquarians in the 19th century made references to another cairn nearby at Leacharail, but the site of this has never been located.

== Etymology ==
According to Petrie (Letter to Larcom, Aug. 1837), the name may mean 'Ryefort' (it appears as Lios a' tSeagail, seagail meaning rye in Irish, in early maps). However lios in Irish refers generally to a court or enclosed area, so it may be that the name originally referred to the area enclosed by the dolmens, on which Listoghil stands, rather than the cairn itself.

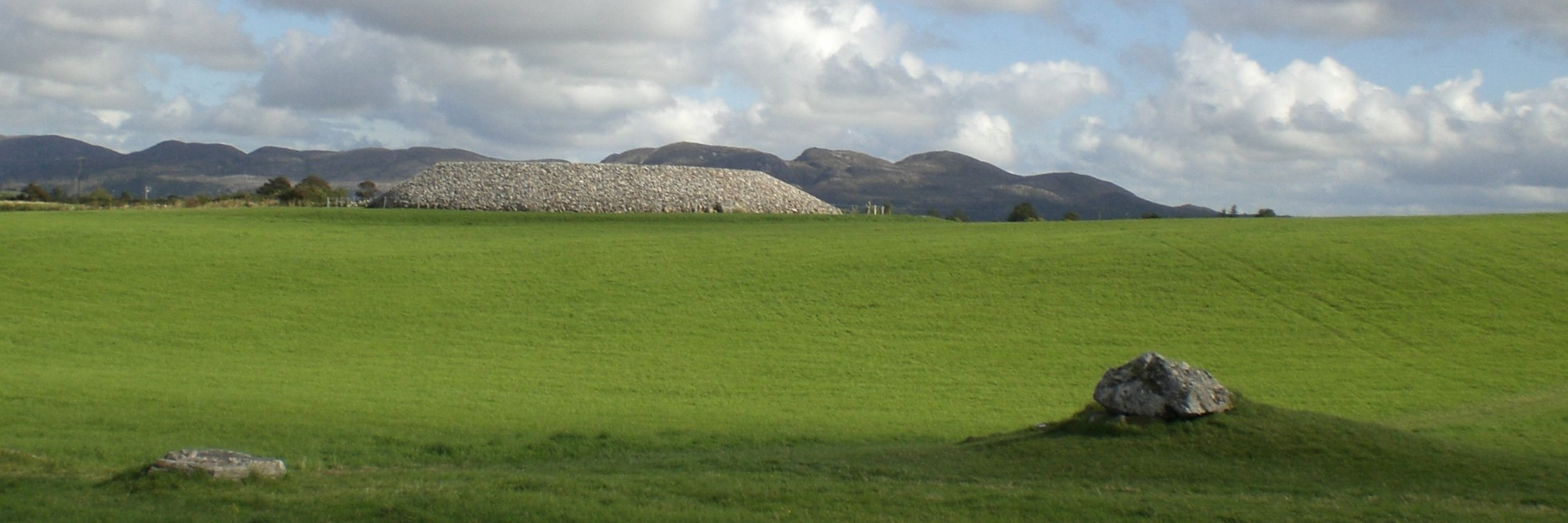
Listoghil from the north west with a small satellite tomb, tomb 52, in the foreground

== Location ==
Listoghil stands 59 meters above sea level at the geographic centre of the Cúil Iorra Peninsula, c. 3 km from Sligo town. Set close to the highest point in the cluster of monuments, along a low ridge, it acts as the focus of the Carrowmore passage tomb complex. To the west is Knocknarea with Miosgán Médhbh and to the east the two great cairns on Cairns hill.

Listoghil is surrounded - and generally, faced - by a cluster of 'dolmen circles', also classified as passage tombs by archaeologists. These were open and uncovered. Listoghil is larger than its satellites, being about 34 meters in diameter; the satellites average about 15 meters. Queen Maeve's cairn, on Knocknarea Mountain, is twice the diameter, and stands at about 10 meters high.

== Early excavation and damage ==
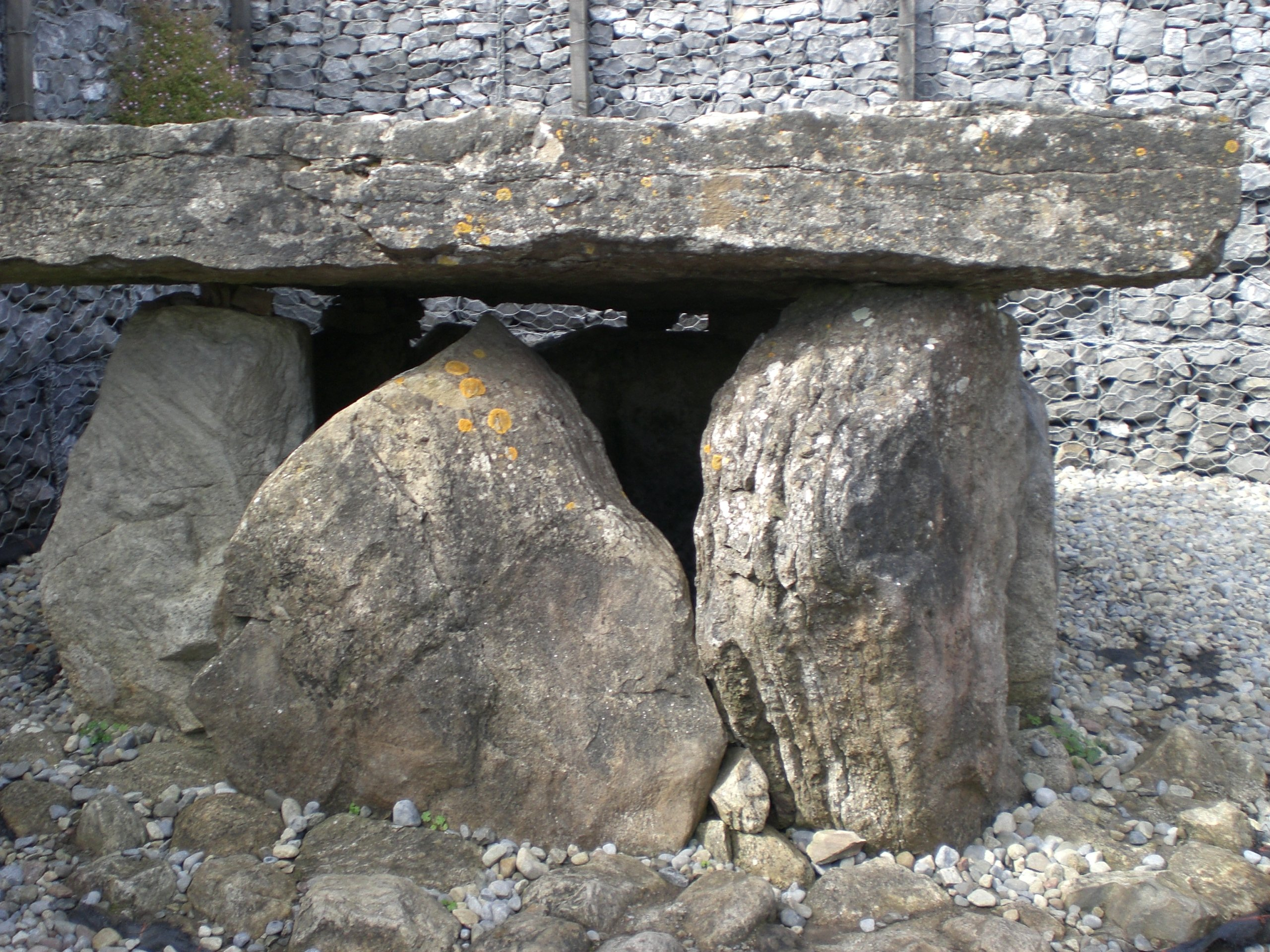
The central chamber in Listoghil

Writings by Charles Elcock from the 1880s describe workmen removing the stones for 'road metal'. Only when quarrymen uncovered the burial chamber in the middle of the mound did its destruction end. By the end of the 19th century the tomb had been investigated by antiquarians of the period who recorded finding 'bones of horses', charred wood and a worked flint javelin head. Some materials from this tomb are in the Alnwick Castle collection

== Excavation and restoration ==
In the late 1990s, Goran Burenhult, a Swedish archaeologist, partly excavated Listoghil. He dated bone and carbon material, and exposed the still-intact kerb. The monument was subsequently restored by the Office of Public Works. Listoghil now consists of a 4 meter tall, 34 meter diameter cairn. Access to the central chamber - via a 13-meter artificial avenue of gabions - is possible. The chamber at the heart of the mound is a dolmen-like structure, with 6 orthostats. A single limestone slab - tilted at 6.1° - crowns the chamber. A rare example of Irish megalithic art outside of the Boyne valley, consisting of concentric circular carvings, can be seen on the front side of the roof slab (this is visible only in certain lighting conditions). A symbol described by Julian Cope as 'a strangely distorted tryfuss' has been carved on a stone inside.

Bone and carbon material from Listoghil was carbon dated to around 3500 BC. The human bones found there were a mixture of cremated, and un-cremated bones; the older, smaller tombs around it generally contain burnt bones. Extensive burning took place on the area of the site before the chamber was erected.

== Alignment ==
Listoghil points at a low saddle-like formation in the Ballygawley Mountains, 6.5 km to the east-southeast. Sunrise in this position coincides with the start and the end of winter, which are traditionally important seasonal festivals in the Gaelic calendar. This happens on 31 October and on 10 February in our modern calendar, dates which do not coincide exactly with a modern astronomical cross-quarter day. But the alignment with the axis of the chamber and the illumination of the chamber by sunlight coincides to the day with that of another Neolithic passage tomb, the Mound of the Hostages at the heart of the Tara complex.

== Sources ==
- Tombs for Hunters, Burenhult, G, British Archaeology 82, 2005, pp22–27
- The Megalithic European, Cope, J, HarperCollins, London, 2004
- Letter from Petrie to Larcom, Aug 12 1837. Ordnance Survey Letters, Royal Irish Academy, Shelf Mark 14 F 14 No 45
