= Passage tombs in Ireland =

Megalithic monument category

Passage tombs are a category of Megalithic monument from the Neolithic period. They are found in most regions of Ireland but are more prevalent in the Northern half of the island. The usage period of Irish passage tombs date from c. 3750 B.C. to about 2500 B.C. About twenty clusters are recorded in Ireland, but the best known examples are found along a curved trajectory from the west coast to the east, including the centres of Carrowmore and Carrowkeel in County Sligo, and Loughcrew and the Boyne Valley in County Meath.

== Architectural features ==
The term 'passage tomb' only dates back to the mid twentieth century. Before then, the monuments were called by other terms, such as "chambered cairns" "Danish mounds" or "tumuli". A number of authors of the modern era, including Alison Sheridan and Robert Hensey, have attempted to categorise passage tombs. Hensey suggests three categories; small and simple open monuments, often circular, such as found at Carrowmore, County Sligo; intermediate scale monuments with a cairn covering some form of burial chamber. An example of these would be the Loughcrew passage tombs. This category may have distinctive abstract carvings or petroglyphs in the style of the Irish passage tomb tradition, solar alignments, recumbent kerbs. Burial ritual may include both cremation and deposition of unburnt bones. The third category is exemplified by super monuments similar to Newgrange in the Boyne Valley. These are constructed on a greater scale, possess more elaborate artwork and are architecturally extravagant, incorporating techniques such as corbelling (this is also seen in the second category), long roofed passages, sillstones, and with building materials brought from distant locations. More elaborate passage tomb tradition monuments may have sub-divisions of architectural space; cruciform layouts are well known from Loughcrew, Carrowkeel and the Boyne Valley Sometimes the clusters of monuments have a focal or central monument, bigger than its 'satellites'. This pattern is seen at Knowth and at Carrowmore. There is often structure on an even larger scale associated with landscape features such as lakes, rivers and mountains observed in the layout. For instance at Carrowkeel, Sligo, a smaller cluster in the Bricklieve Mountains has a number of outlying sites such as the Pinnacle on Keash Hill, Ardloy, Heapstown and Suigh Lughaidh One feature of Irish passage tombs that distinguishes them from other monumental types of the Neolithic era is the longevity of the tradition. They appear to be in use for well over a millennium, in contrast to other monument types associated with the early Neolithic, such as court tombs or portal dolmens.

== Grave goods ==
Burials in Irish passage tombs tend to be accompanied by a limited and distinctive range of objects. These grave goods include pins fashioned from bone or red deer antler, carved and polished stone pendants, pieces of quartz, flint or chert tools, stone or chalk balls and a distinctive form of pottery called Carrowkeel ware, named thus because it was first noted in Carrowkeel. The pots, formed of reddish clay, are fashioned in a variety of sizes, but are always round-bottomed, and often decorated with stab and drag patterns. Few intact examples have been recovered, but these include some fine examples from the Mound of the Hostages (Dumha na nGiall) passage tomb at the Hill of Tara, County Meath

== Solar cult ==
After his excavation and restoration work at Newgrange, Michael O'Kelly reported his discovery of a solar alignment on the winter solstice. Such alignments have been claimed for monuments in different parts of Ireland and abroad, for example in Maes Howe, Scotland; Loughcrew, County Meath; Knockroe (County Kilkenny), County Kilkenny and in Listoghil, the central monument at Carrowmore, County Sligo,

== International connections ==
The Irish passage tombs bear similarities to examples found in other locations on the Atlantic facade; in particular in Brittany, France; Wales and Scotland. Ancient DNA research has associated the dead in the Irish monuments with early farming migrations to the Atlantic region about 6000 years ago. The ancient ancestral origin of these groups was Anatolia. Familial connections between people buried at Carrowmore, Carrowkeel, Millin Bay and Newgrange have been demonstrated, and the passage tomb populations appear to cluster (in genetic terms) away from occupants of other neolithic monuments and the general Irish neolithic population. This (and an indication of incest in the genetic profile of a male interred in the right recess of Newgrange) has led a team of researchers in Trinity College Dublin to propose that Irish neolithic society was led by dynastic rulers. Lara Cassidy stated, "It seems what we have here is a powerful extended kin-group, who had access to elite burial sites in many regions of the island for at least half a millennium".

== Unopened monuments ==
Although some of the more high profile Irish passage tombs have been excavated and - sometimes controversially - reconstructed, many monuments remain unexcavated. Many hill cairns and lowland cairns may be passage tombs; monuments such as Shee Mór in County Leitrim, Heapstown in County Sligo and Croghaun, near Raphoe in County Donegal.

== Examples ==
- Newgrange
- Knowth
- Dowth
- Fourknocks
- Rathcoran
- Loughcrew
- Carrowkeel
- Carrowmore
