= Slieve na Calliagh =

Hills and tombs in County Meath, Ireland

- Sliabh na Caillí or Sliabh na Cailleach
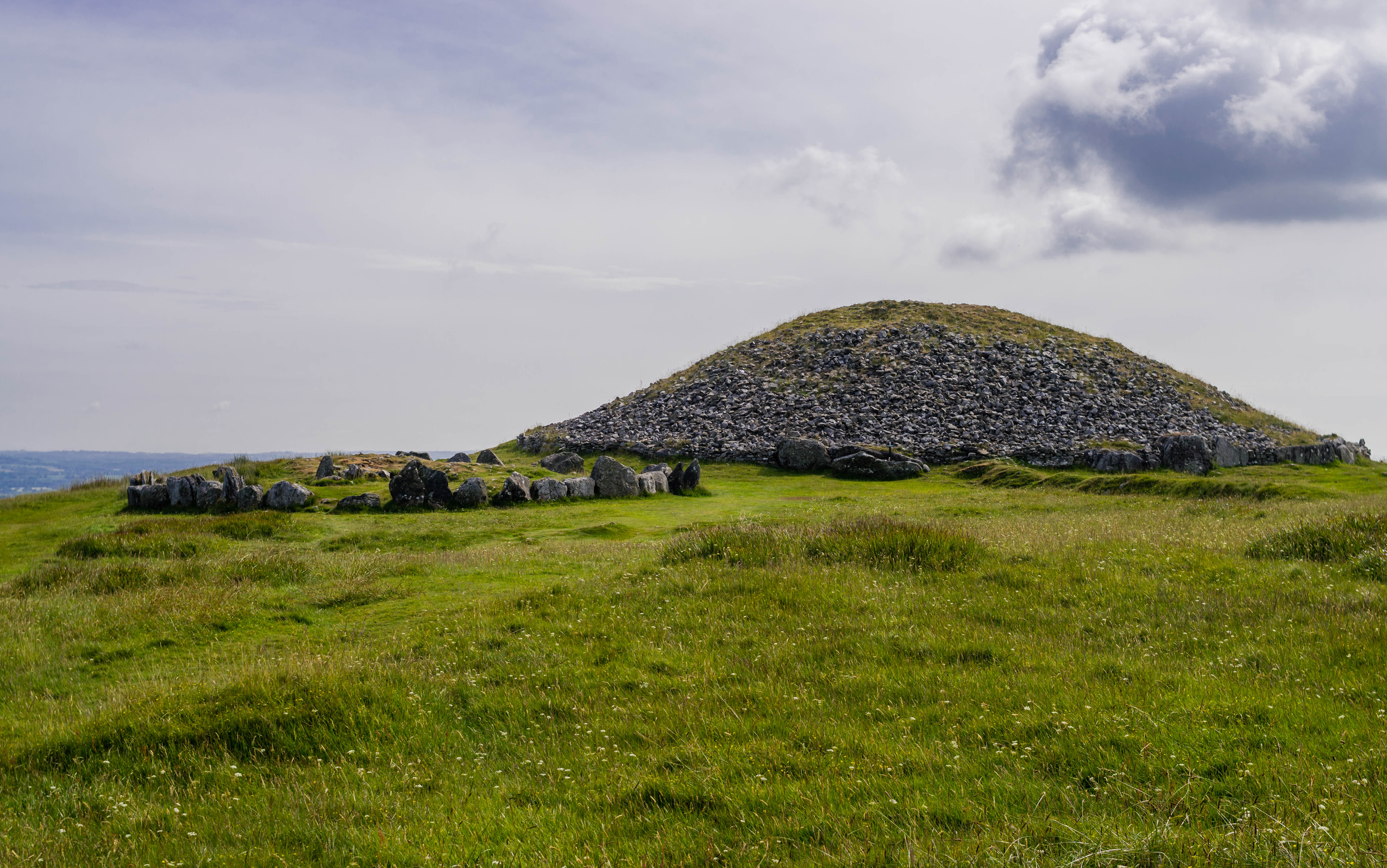
- The Hag's Carn on Slieve na Calliagh

Highest point
- Elevation: 276 m (906 ft)
- Prominence: 171 m (561 ft)
- Listing: County Top (Meath), Marilyn
- Coordinates: 53°44′40″N 7°06′42″W

Naming
- English translation: the hag's mountain
- Language of name: Irish

Geography
- Location within island of Ireland
- Location: County Meath, Ireland
- Parent range: Meath Hills
- OSI/OSNI grid: N586775

Slieve na Calliagh (Irish: Sliabh na Caillí or Sliabh na Cailleach, meaning 'the Cailleach's mountain') are a range of hills and ancient burial site near Oldcastle, County Meath, Ireland. The summit is 276 metres (906 ft), the highest point in the county. On the hilltops are about twenty passage tombs, some decorated with rare megalithic art, which were built in the 4th millennium BC. Also called the Loughcrew tombs, it is a protected National Monument and is one of the main passage tomb cemeteries in Ireland, along with Brú na Bóinne, Carrowkeel and Carrowmore.

== Naming ==
The hills are named after the Cailleach, the divine hag of Irish mythology. Legend has it that the monuments were created when a giant hag, striding across the land, dropped her cargo of large stones from her apron.

== Hills ==
Slieve na Calliagh includes the hills of Carnbane East, Carnbane West, Carrickbrack, and Patrickstown Hill.

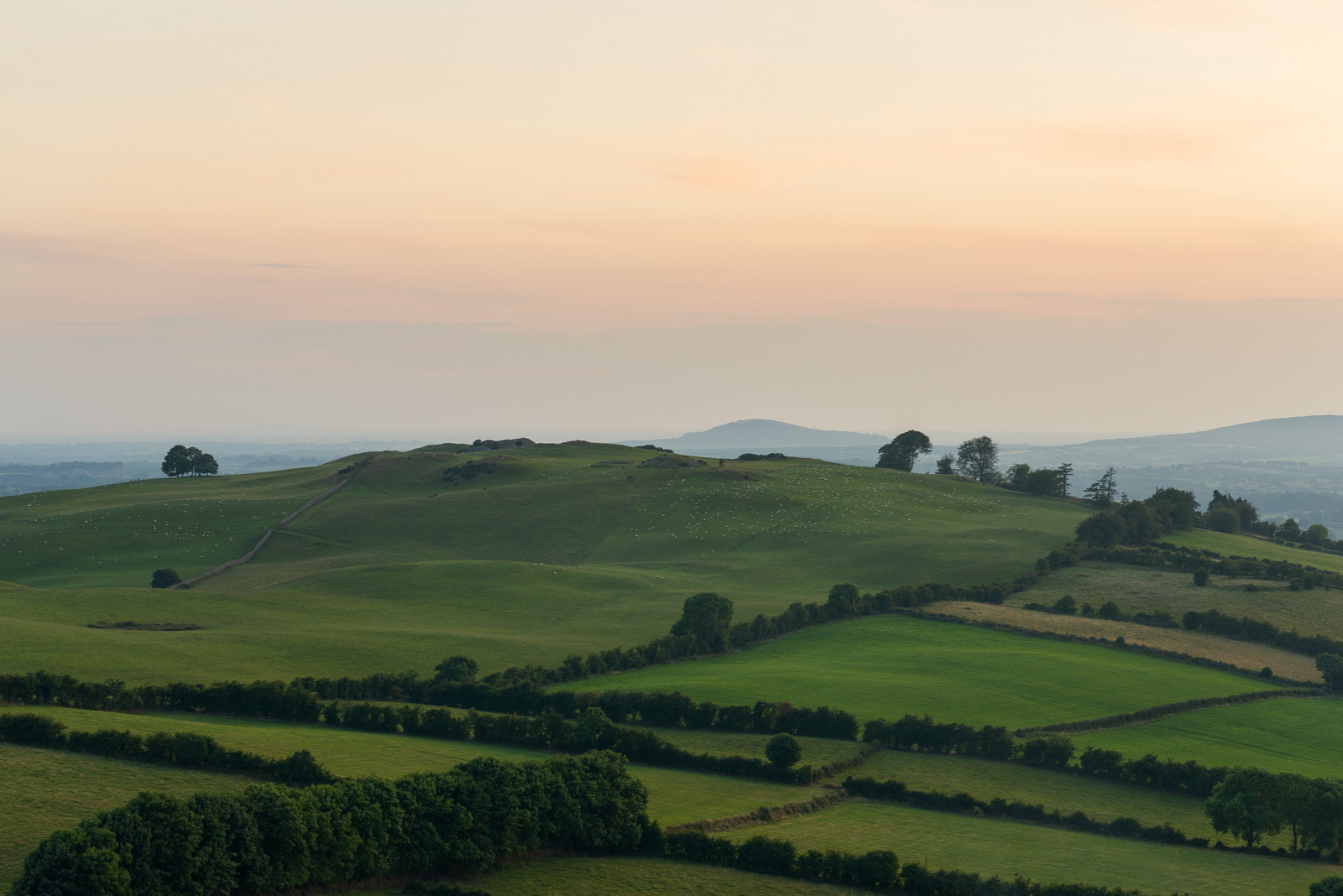
Carnbane West

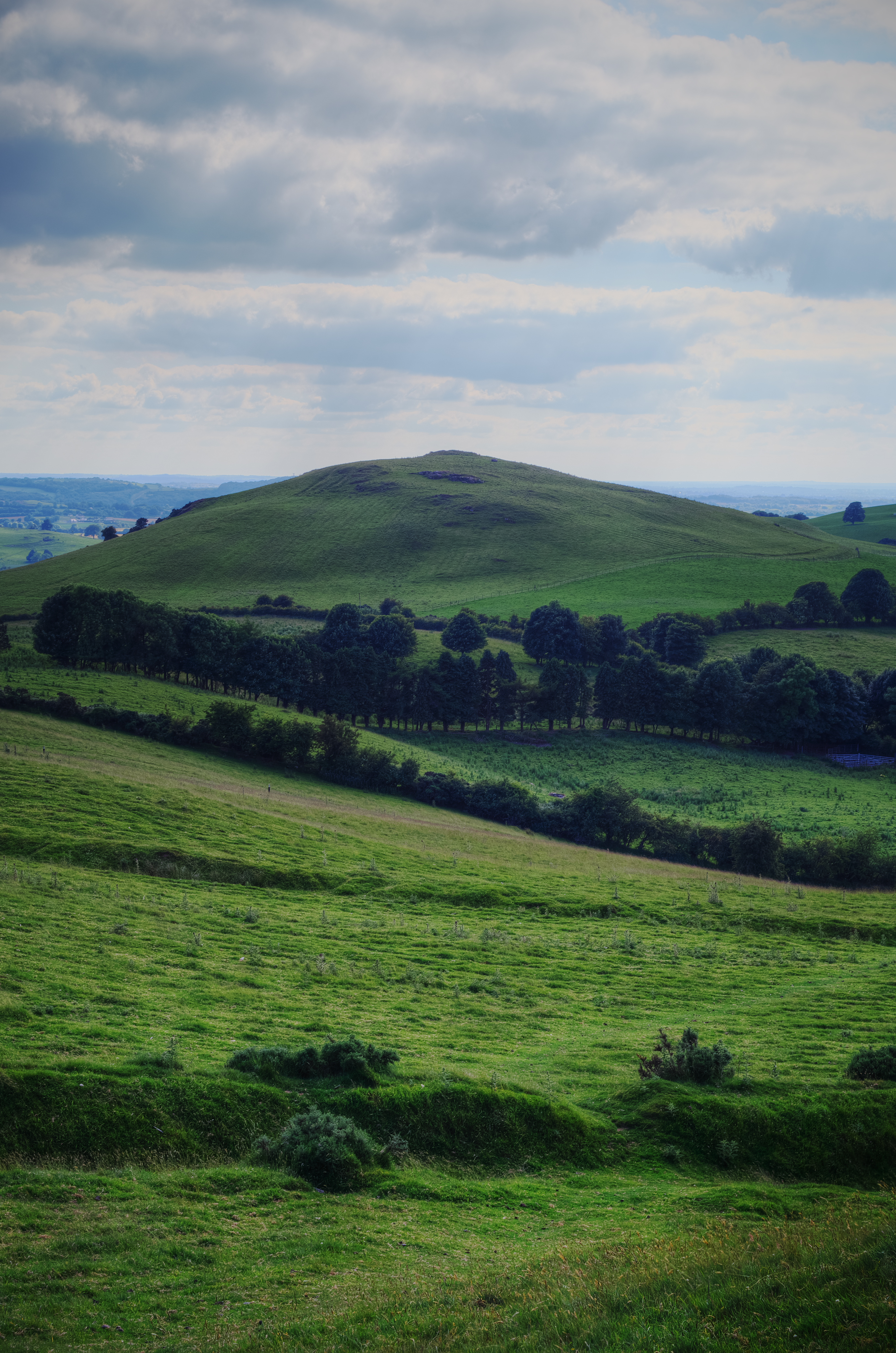
Carrickbrack

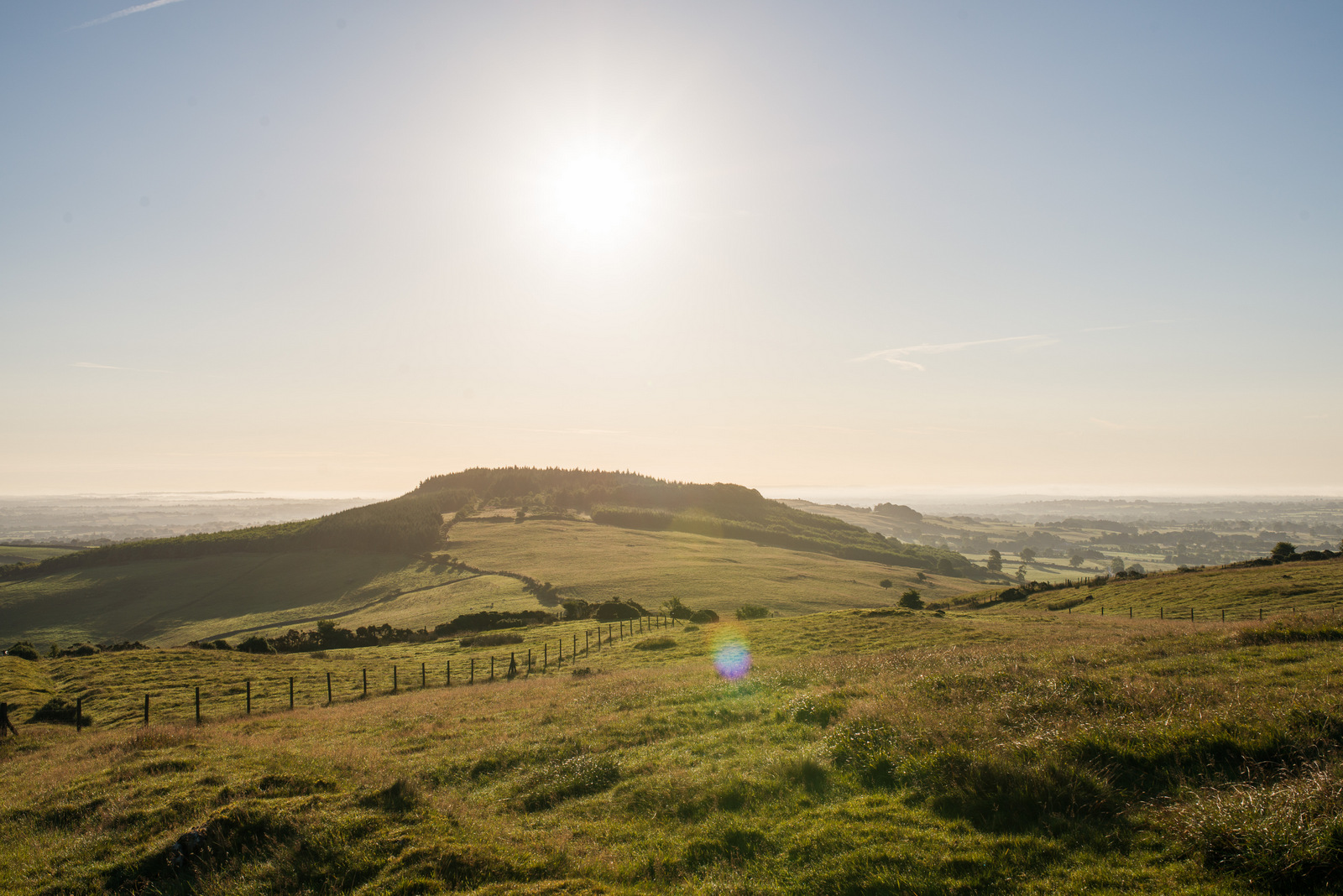
Patrickstown Hill

== Tombs ==
On the hilltops are the remains of more than twenty ancient tombs and cairns dating back to the 4th millennium BC. It is one of the four main passage tomb cemeteries in Ireland along with Brú na Bóinne, Carrowkeel and Carrowmore. The cemetery itself is also known as Slieve na Calliagh, or the Loughcrew tombs.

The monuments were described by the archaeologist E.A. Conwell in 1864 when he presented a paper to the Royal Irish Academy. Conwel's surveys and investigations were followed by those of Rotherham in 1895, and George Coffey at the start of the 20th century. Most of the monuments are remains of passage tombs that are estimated to date from around 3,000 BC. Research on human remains found in association with similar Irish monuments suggests that the builders were descendants of people who settled in Ireland from around 4,200 BC. The two main cairns on the site are known as Cairn L and Cairn T, the latter of which is also called the 'Tomb of Ollamh Fodhla' or the 'Hag's Cairn'. More than 30 monuments have been identified and there may once have been between fifty and one hundred mounds in the area. Several of the monuments are covered in rare megalithic art.

In 1980, Irish-American researcher Martin Brennan discovered that Cairn T is directed to receive the beams of the rising sun on the spring and autumnal equinox, when the sunbeam shines down the passage and lights up the megalithic art on the backstone. Above this stone is a decorated ceiling stone which is also lit by the sun during the spring equinox sunrise. The passage tombs likely predate those at Brú na Bóinne and much of their art anticipates similar forms used at those sites.

The site is a protected National Monument. In recent years, some of the Loughcrew tombs have been vandalised with graffiti, and security patrols have been put in place. Irish folklore holds that it is bad luck to damage or disrespect such tombs and that doing so could bring a curse.

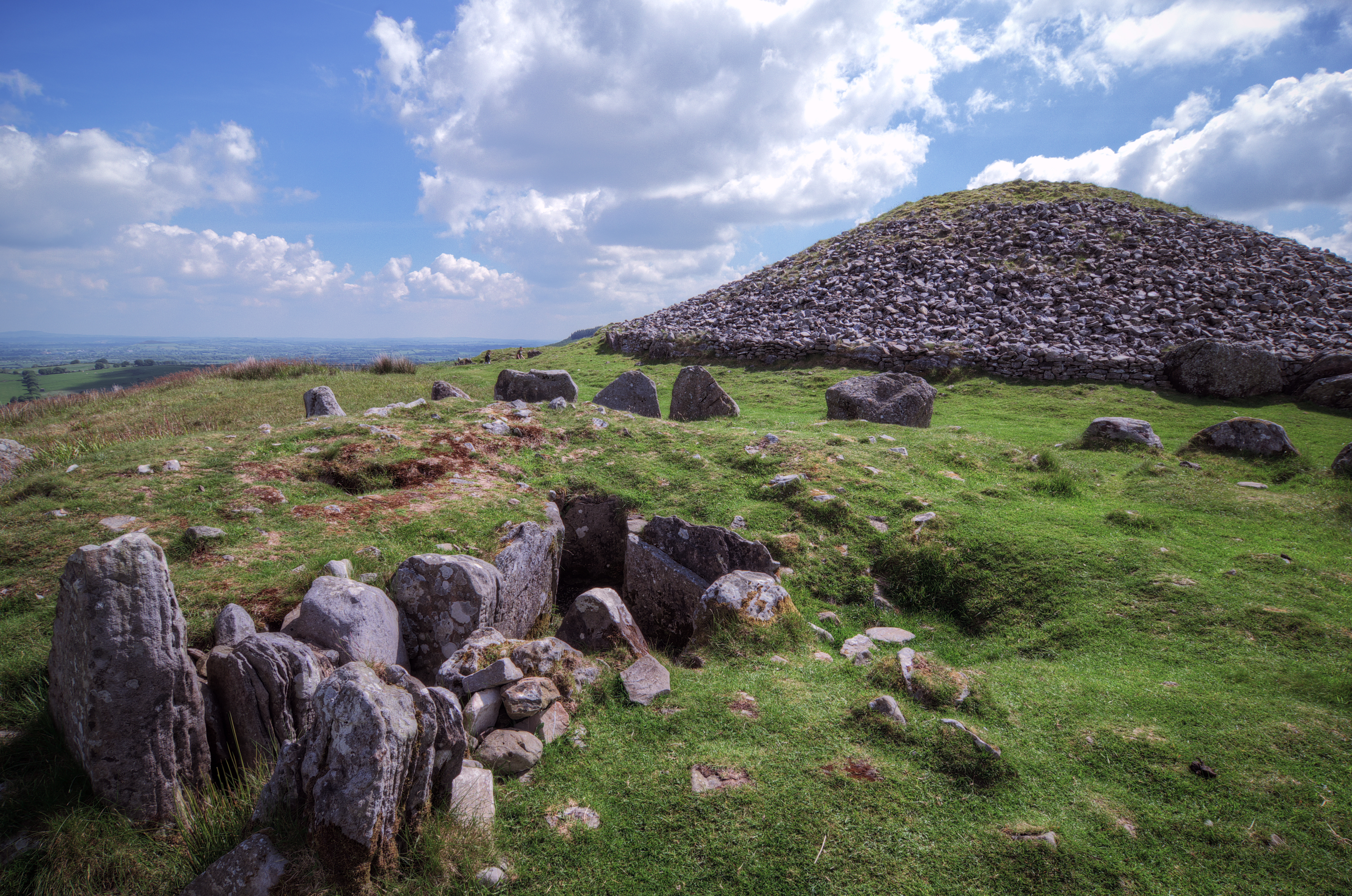
Cairn S and Cairn T (The Hag's Carn)

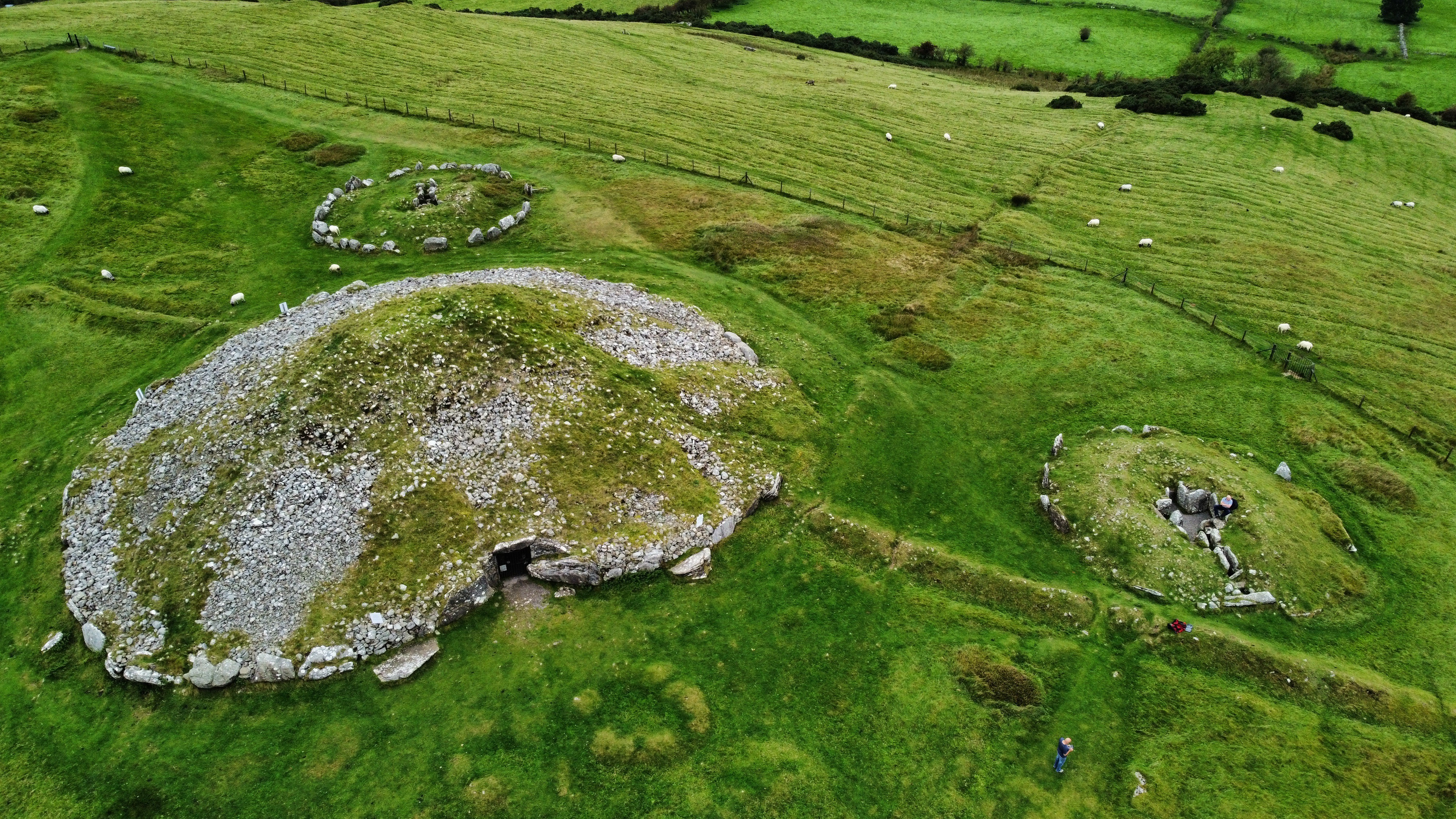
Overhead view of Cairn S, Cairn T and Cairn U

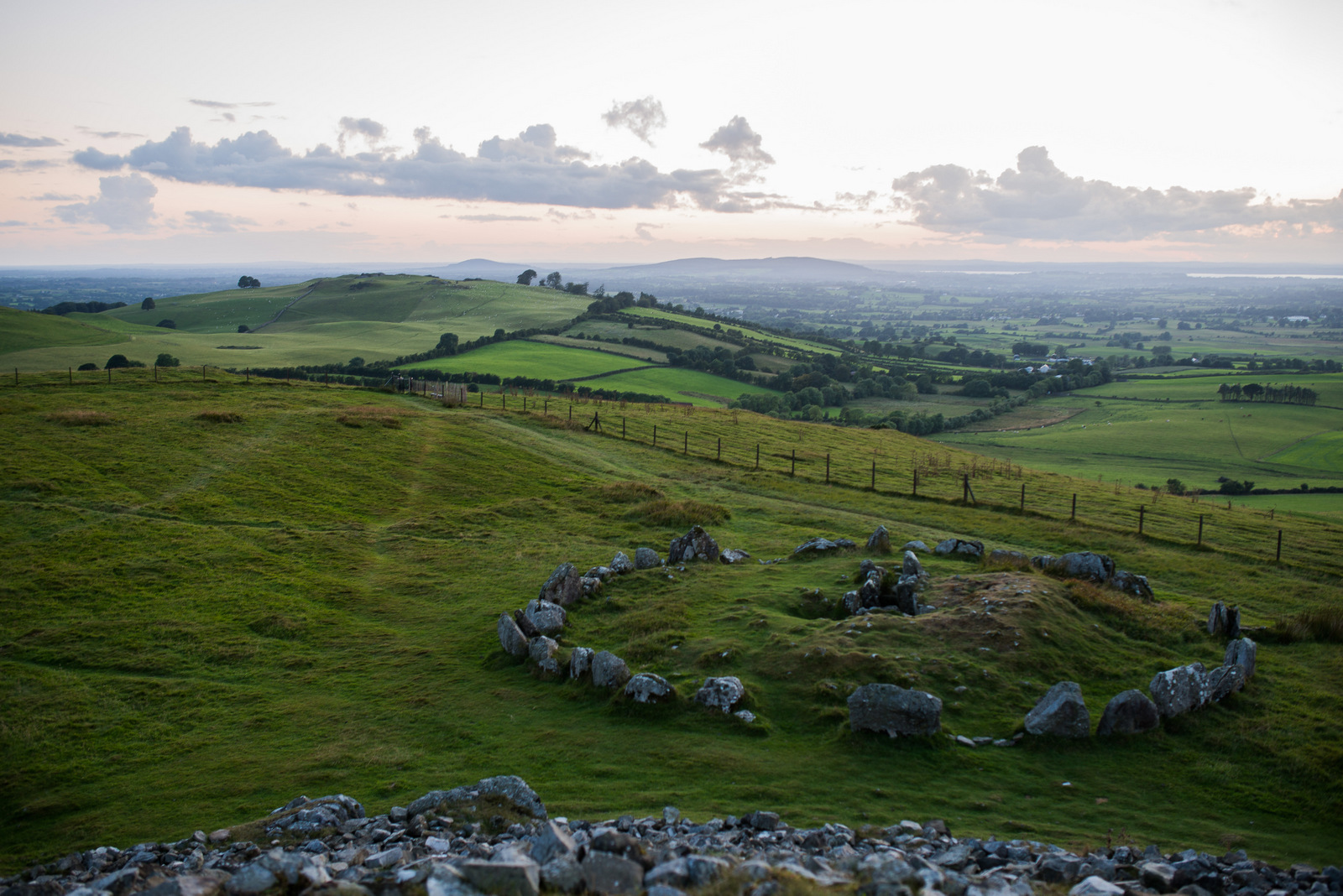
View from the top of Cairn T

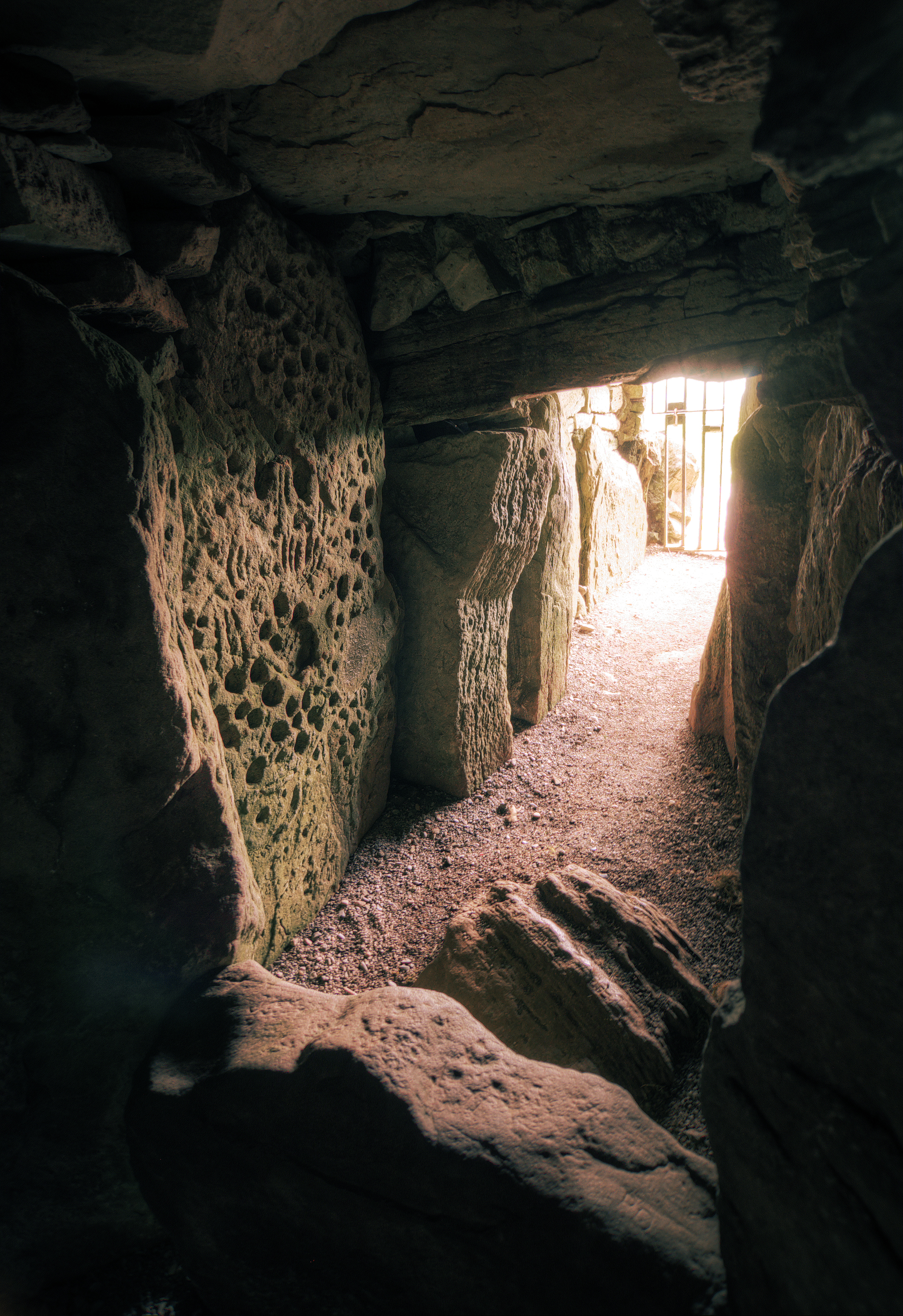
Passage of Cairn T, with cup marks

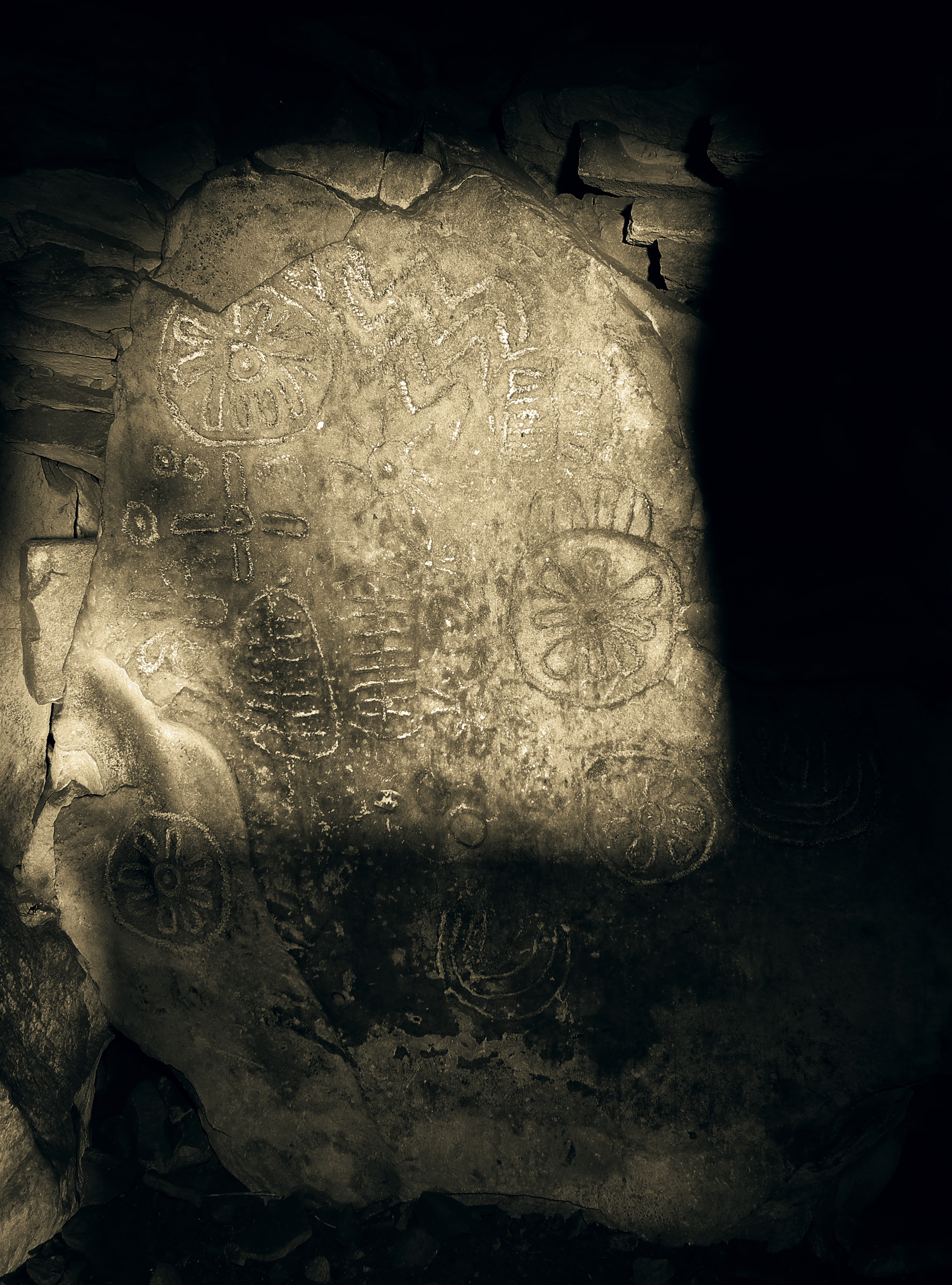
Megalithic art inside Cairn T

== See also ==
- Brain balls - found within some of the dolmens in the area
- Lists of mountains in Ireland
- List of Irish counties by highest point
- List of mountains of the British Isles by height
- List of Marilyns in the British Isles
