= Carrowmore =

Megalithic cemetery in County Sligo, Ireland

Carrowmore Megalithic Cemetery
- An Cheathrú Mhór (Irish)
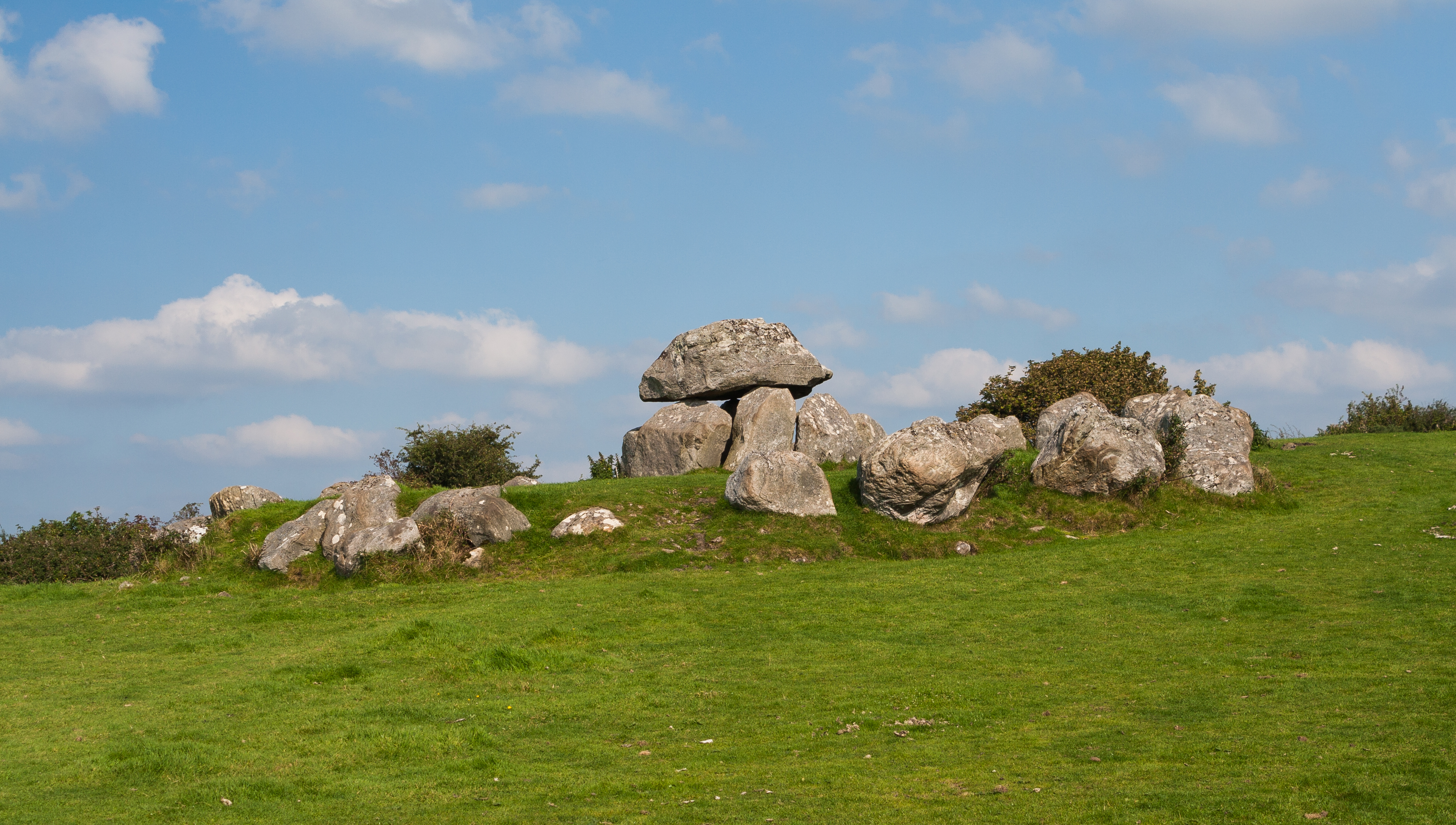
- Tomb 7, a dolmen within a stone circle; one of the Carrowmore 'satellite tombs'.

- Location within Ireland
- 54°15′03.08″N 8°31′09.00″W
- Type: Passage tomb complex
- Periods: Neolithic
- Cultures: Neolithic Europe
- Location: County Sligo, Ireland
- Region: Atlantic Megalithic Zone

History
- Built: 3700–2900 BC

Site notes
- Material: Gneiss, limestone
- Excavation dates: 1977–1980, 1994–1998
- Condition: Partially preserved
- Owner: Public and private
- Management: Admission Fee
- Public access: Yes

National monument of Ireland
- Official name: Carrowmore Passage Tomb Cemetery
- Reference no.: 153

Carrowmore (Irish: An Cheathrú Mhór, 'the great quarter') is a large group of megalithic monuments on the Coolera Peninsula to the west of Sligo, Ireland. They were built in the 4th millennium BC, during the Neolithic (New Stone Age). There are 30 surviving tombs with another 25 which have been destroyed since 1800, making Carrowmore one of the largest clusters of megalithic tombs in Ireland, and one of the 'big four' along with Carrowkeel, Loughcrew and Brú na Bóinne. Carrowmore is the heart of an ancient ritual landscape which is dominated by the mountain of Knocknarea to the west. It is a protected National Monument.

== Location ==
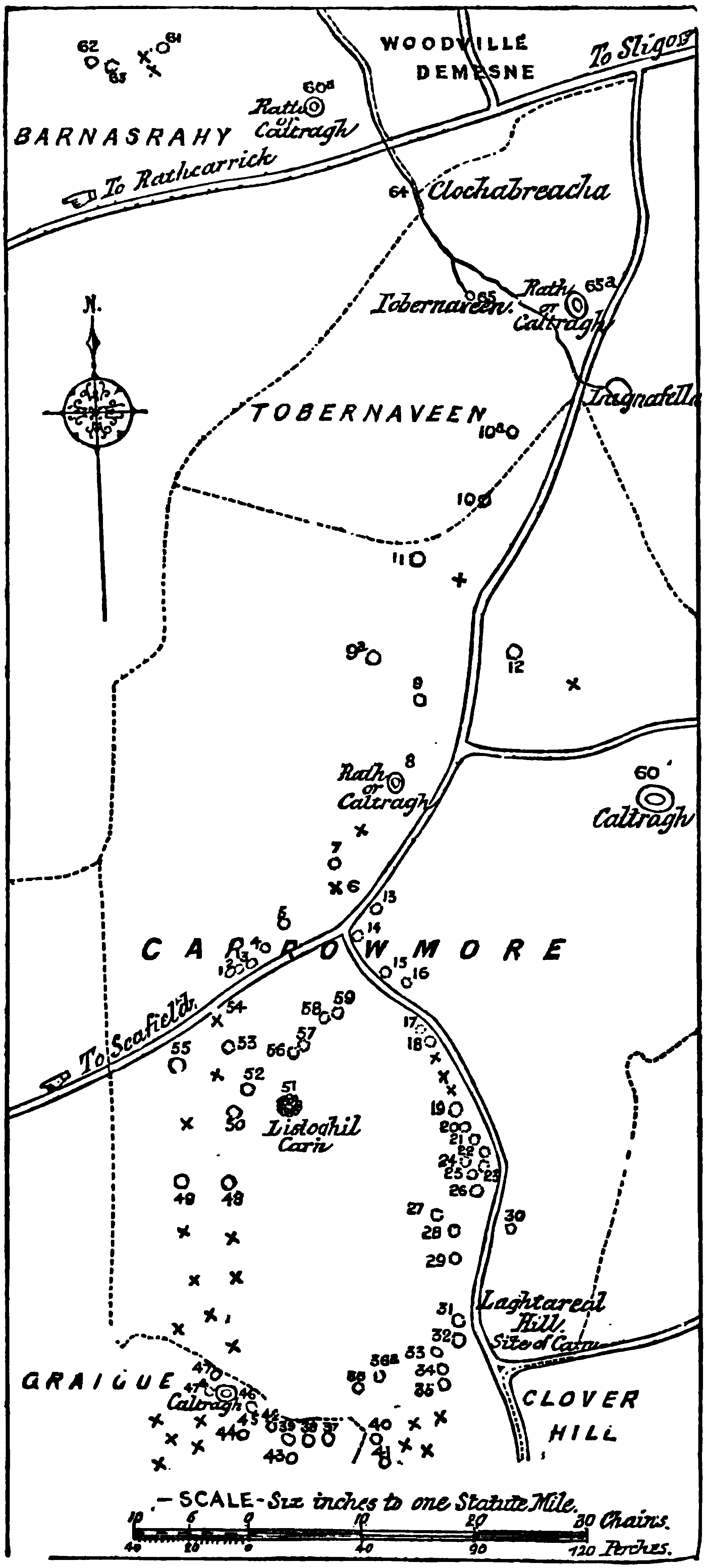
A map of Carrowmore by W. G. Wood-Martin in his article The Rude Stone Monuments of Ireland (1886).

Placed on a small plateau at an altitude of between 36.5 and 59 metres above sea level Carrowmore is the focal point of a prehistoric ritual landscape which is dominated by the mountain of Knocknarea to the west with the great cairn of Miosgán Médhbh on top. To the east, in Carns townland, two large cairns overlook Lough Gill, and along the eastern boundary of the peninsula the Ballygawley Mountains have four passage tombs at their peaks.

== Description ==
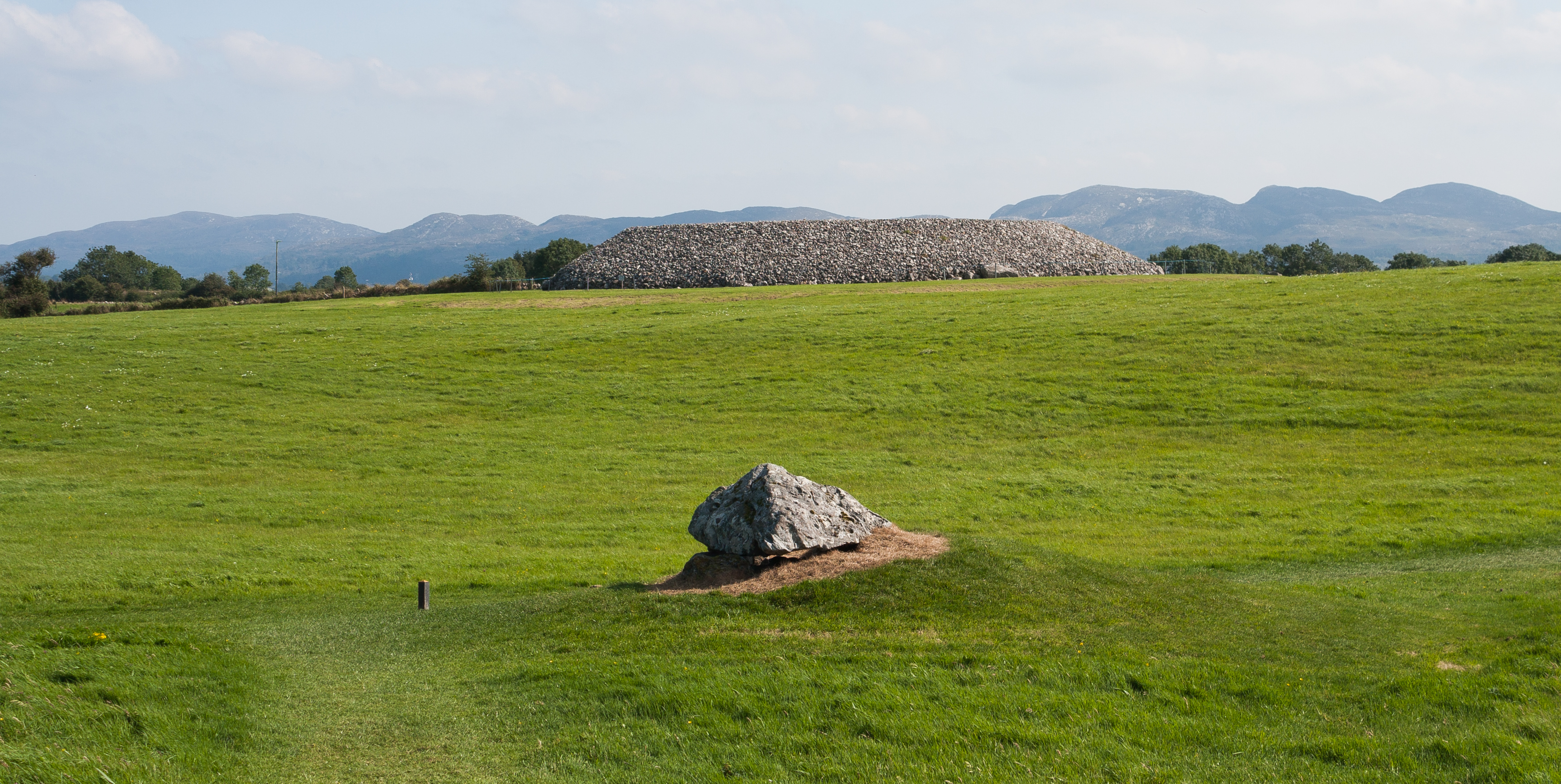
Tomb 52 with the cairn of Listoghil in the background

Thirty monuments survive in Carrowmore today. There may have been more monuments in the complex originally, but some fell victim to quarrying and field clearance during the 18th, 19th and early 20th centuries. The complex is about one kilometre north–south and 600 metres east–west. Most of the sites are "satellite tombs" which surround the largest monument, placed on the high point of the plateau, the cairn (now restored) called Listoghil.

Because of the clustering of the monuments, certain morphological features presented by the tombs, and the assemblage of material found within some of the monuments, Carrowmore – like Newgrange, Loughcrew and Carrowkeel – is classified by archaeologists as being part of the Irish Passage Tomb Tradition. However, in some respects the Carrowmore sites are atypical passage tombs. For example, none of the tombs have lintel-covered, tunnel-like, passages that are a feature of most Irish passage tombs, and only one site (Tomb 51, Listoghil) possesses a cairn.

=== Satellite tombs ===
The monuments (in their original state) consisted of a central dolmen-like megalith with 5 upright orthostats bearing a roughly conical capstone on top, enclosing a small pentagonal burial chamber. These were each enclosed by a boulder circle of 12 to 15 metres in diameter. The boulder circles contain 30 to 40 boulders, usually of gneiss, the material of choice for the tombs. Sometimes a second, inner boulder circle is also present. Entrance stones (or passage stones, crude double rows of standing stones) extend from the central feature, showing the intended orientation of the dolmens. They are not oriented to points of the compass but generally face towards the area of the central cairn. In four examples, monuments are situated in pairs.

Each monument was built on a small level platform of earth and stone. This is one of the secrets of the dolmens' longevity; a well-executed stone packing surrounded the base of the upright stones, locking them in place. One of the satellite tombs, Tomb 27, has a cruciform passage tomb plan, a feature seen in the chambers of later passage tombs like Newgrange or Carrowkeel. The roof – now gone – may have been of stone slabs or corbelled.

=== Listoghil or Tomb 51 ===
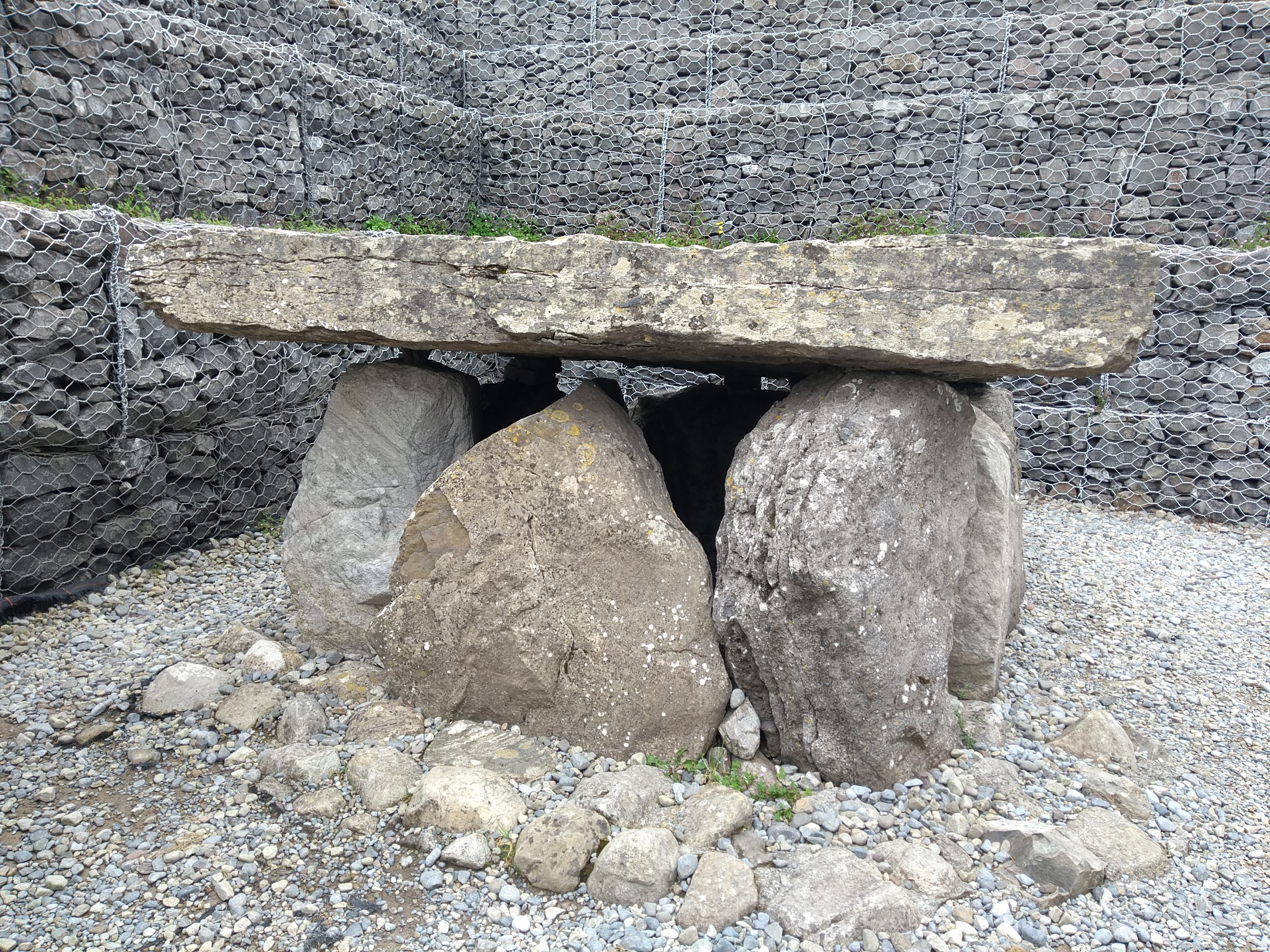
Listoghil or Tomb 51

Listoghil, which was erected c. 3500 BC, is 34 metres in diameter and has a distinctive box-like chamber. The leading edge of the covering stone over the entrance bears marks which may represent the only megalithic art so far found at Carrowmore. Three large boulders were found beside the central chamber and under the cairn; these could be the remains of a destroyed passage or of a megalithic construction predating the cairn. As many of the satellite tombs face the central area, the location of Tomb 51 appears to have been the focal point around which the cemetery developed. This monument was found to contain unburned bones as well as cremations.

== Research history ==
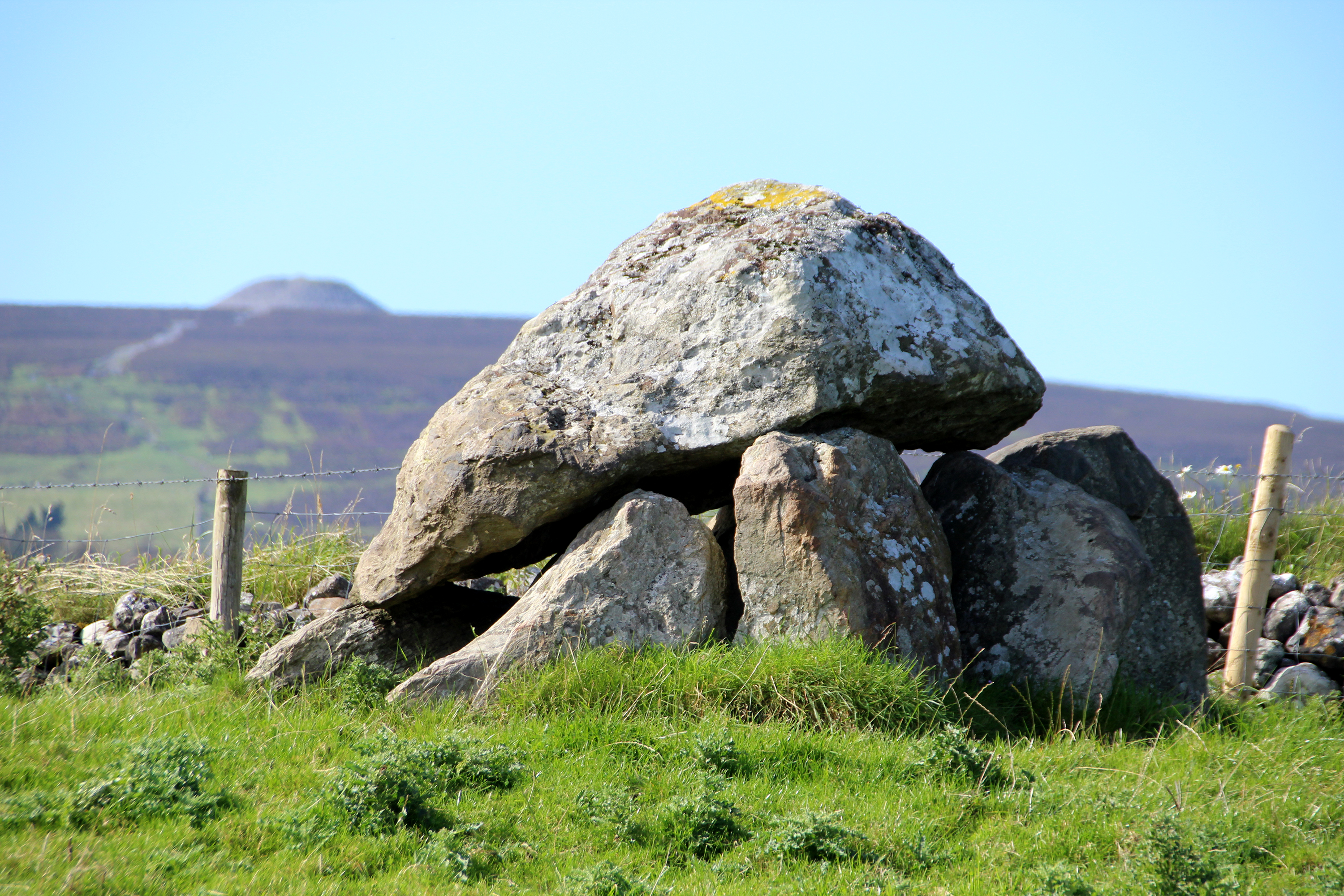
Tomb 13 with Maeve's Cairn in the background

Gabriel Beranger visited the site in 1779 and illustrated some of the monuments. These drawings are a valuable record of the state of Carrowmore at the time, showing some monuments now destroyed or damaged. Many artistic impressions of the monuments through the ages are preserved. Early photographers, such as W.A. Green and R.J. Welch of the Belfast Photographer's club made records just after the turn of the twentieth century.

Early unrecorded antiquarian digs disturbed the Carrowmore tombs, such as conducted by local landlord Rodger Walker in the 19th century. Walker kept poor records of his activities, and his excavations were essentially treasure hunts to augment his antiquities collection. Some of the material recovered is now at Alnwick castle in Northumberland, England The sites were surveyed and numbered by George Petrie and reported in his 1837 Ordnance Survey Ireland. William Gregory Wood-Martin made the first recorded excavations in the 1880s.

=== Recent excavations ===
Excavations led by the Swedish archaeologist Göran Burenhult were conducted over two seasonal campaigns, 1977–1982 and 1994–1998. Ten tombs were fully or partially excavated. Listoghil was excavated in 1996–8. Excavations conducted by the National Roads Authority for the Inner Relief Road route in Maugheraboy near Sligo – three kilometres from Carrowmore – have shown that a causewayed enclosure existed at the same time as Carrowmore. Causewayed enclosures are diagnostic of Neolithic activity in Europe.

=== Excavation results ===
The Carrowmore burial assemblage is typical of that of the Irish passage tomb tradition. It includes antler and bone pins with mushroom shaped heads, beads, pendants and stone or clay balls. Quartz fragments accompanied most of the burials; this material clearly had ritual significance in the passage tomb tradition. The discovery of antler pins and shellfish in the chambers might suggest that the earliest monuments were built by people who followed hunter-gatherer lifeways; but the presence of small amounts of Carrowkeel ware Neolithic pottery at these sites is also suggestive of farming influence.

The chambers contained the remains of multiple individuals. Most of the Neolithic burials at Carrowmore appear to have been cremations. The chambers were re-used intermittently for burial and deposition of artefacts by the people of the Bronze Age and Iron Ages.

The small Carrowmore dolmens seem not to have been covered by stone cairns: although such ideas were once popular among antiquarians, the discovery of "settings" of stone and finds close to the chambers and of Roman and Bronze Age artefacts make it unlikely – according to Burenhult – that such cairns ever existed.

=== Radiocarbon dates ===
Radiocarbon dates from the survey and excavation project in the 1970s, 80s and 90s by Professor Göran Bürenhult generated some controversy at the time, as Burenhult interpreted the dates to indicate that the monuments were erected and used by a hunter gatherer community. For example, a sample taken from the chamber of Carrowmore 3 was claimed to indicate a date of 5400 BC. Burenhult's theory of Mesolithic tomb builders, first presented in 1982, received critical revision in the quarter century that followed. A source critical review and 25 new radiocarbon dates demonstrated that the Carrowmore monuments are shown to have spanned the era circa 3750 BC to circa 3000 BC. This data set is supported by palaeo-environmental studies in adjacent lakes conducted by Stolze, O'Connell, Ghilardi and others, showing farming activity coincident with or preceding monument use.

=== Ancient DNA ===
The analysis of ancient DNA derived from human bone shows a web of connections between occupants of monuments of the Irish Passage Tomb Tradition. A male buried in Listoghil, Carrowmore, showed a detectable kin relationship to three others, buried in Newgrange, Millin Bay and Carrowkeel. This (combined with stable isotope results indicating a more protein rich diet than that of the general Neolithic population) was suggested to indicate a dynastic elite lineage buried in these prestigious locations in the Neolithic era.

== Discussion ==
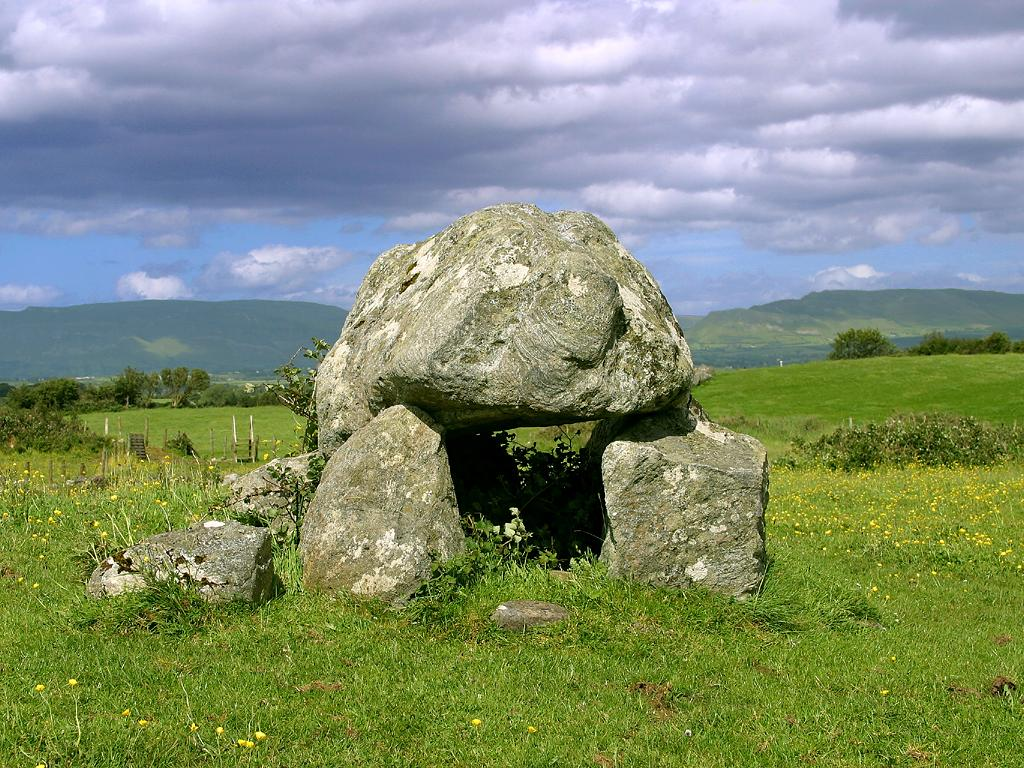
Tomb 4

Research at Carrowmore has helped clarify the chronology of the development of the passage tomb tradition in Ireland. Although some important Irish passage tomb sites are not dated, and early dates have been obtained elsewhere it is possible that Carrowmore represents some of the earliest passage tombs constructed in Ireland.

Ancient genetics now indicate a large scale dispersal of farming communities whose origin was in Anatolia. The role of megaliths as monuments and foci of ceremony and celebration, as well as markers on the landscape is emphasised by archaeologists such as Richard Bradley; but they were also memorials to particular lineages and possibly individuals from elite groups.

Carrowmore represents a foundation point and a centre point in a Neolithic landscape. The building of large cairns such as Listoghil or Miosgán Médhbh on Knocknarea may represent a later phase of megalith-building of greater scale and ambition than the earliest passage tombs. The area of the Cúil Irra peninsula and its hinterlands is dotted with such tombs, often on hilltops, which inspired Stefan Bergh to style it the "Landscape of the Monuments".

== Dump crisis ==
Carrowmore was the subject of an extended legal battle when in 1983 Sligo County Council sought to place a municipal landfill dump on a quarry site about 100 yards from part of the complex. The council's decision was contested by five local residents in the High Court, in Dublin in late 1983, and the High Court ruled that the County Council could proceed with its plans, on certain conditions. The case was appealed to the Supreme Court which ruled against the Council in 1989.

A notable feature of the judgment was that it marked the first explicit legal recognition of the idea of an architectural landscape, extending the legal protection of a national monument to include the surrounding area.

== Visitor centre ==
In 1989–90 the State purchased approximately 25 acres (10 ha), on which stood a number of monuments and a small cottage. The cottage was developed for use as a basic visitor interpretative facility run by the Office of Public Works, this development marked the first stage in developing the Carrowmore archaeological complex for public access. Later land purchases means that most of the site is now under public ownership.

The small farmhouse is close to the R292 road, approximately 2 km (1.2 mi) east of Ransboro crossroads. It houses an exhibition and, from March to the end of October, provides both guided tours and multi-lingual self-guide options for the Carrowmore megaliths. Most of the tombs can be accessed from there.

== Sources ==
- Tombs for Hunters, Burenhult, G, British Archaeology 82, 2005, pp22–27.
- Landscape of the Monuments, Bergh, S. University of Stockholm, 1995.
- Unpicking the Chronology of Carrowmore. Bergh, S & Hensey, R. Oxford Journal of Archaeology 32(4) 343–366, 2013.
- Altering the Earth. The Origins of Monuments in Britain and Continental Europe, Bradley, R. Edinburgh: Society of Antiquaries of Scotland, 1993.
- Monumental Beginnings, Danagher, E. Dublin: National Roads Authority, 2007.
