= The Modern Antiquarian =

Book by Julian Cope

- Author: Julian Cope
- Language: English
- Subject: Reference, Gazetteer
- Published: 1 October 1998 HarperCollins
- Publication place: United Kingdom
- Media type: Print
- Pages: 448
- ISBN: 978-0-7225-3599-8
- OCLC: 40144018
- Dewey Decimal: 936.1 21
- LC Class: GN805 .C58 1998
- Followed by: The Megalithic European (2004)

The Modern Antiquarian: A Pre-Millennial Odyssey Through Megalithic Britain is a guide book written by Julian Cope, published in 1998. It is written as a travelogue of British megalithic sites, including Stonehenge and Avebury. Types of artifacts catalogued include stone circles, hillforts and barrows.

== Details ==
In the introduction Cope explains how a visit to Avebury Stone Circle inspired his enthusiasm for the subject. He was disappointed with the quality of available guidebooks, so decided to write his own. He visited and researched hundreds of sites over eight years, selecting about 300 of the most significant for the book.

The book is divided into two sections, the first being ten essays by Cope about various aspects of British Isles megalithic culture. The second and main part of the book is a geographically arranged gazetteer of the sites. Each entry includes field notes, directions, map references and photographs or drawings.

A documentary film of the same name was made for the BBC in mid-2000. A website based on the book was launched in 2000. It invites users to add their own knowledge, research and photographs of the ancient sites of Britain and Ireland and currently holds information on over 7,400 archaeological sites. As of 2004 the book had sold more than 40,000 copies.

In October 2004 Cope published the follow-up volume The Megalithic European on 300 sites scattered across Europe and Scandinavia.

== Publications ==
- Cope, Julian (1998). The Modern Antiquarian. London: Thorsons. ISBN 978-0-7225-3599-8.

== See also ==
- European Megalithic Culture
- Neolithic Europe
- Megalithic architectural elements
- Dolmen
- Aubrey Burl's Guide to stone circles
