= Coolera Peninsula =

Peninsula in County Sligo, Ireland

Coordinates: 54.267°N 8.592°W

Cúil Iorra
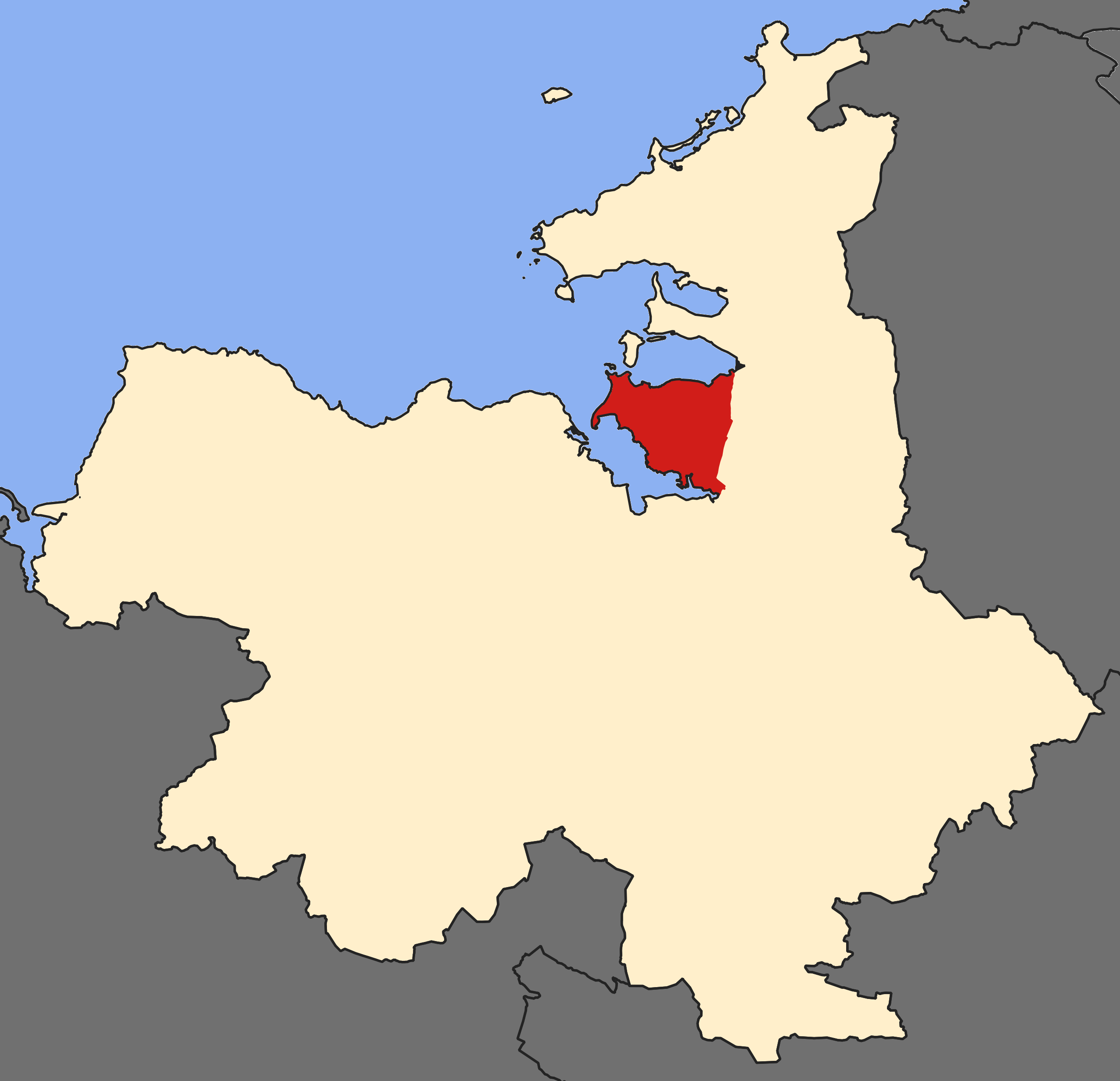
- Coolera Peninsula (Red) within County Sligo
- Interactive map of Coolera Peninsula

Geography
- Location: Ireland
- Adjacent to: Atlantic Ocean
- Area: 48.1 km^{2} (18.6 sq mi)

Administration
- Ireland
- County: Sligo

Demographics
- Population: 9,022 (2016)
- Pop. density: 187.6/km^{2} (485.9/sq mi)

The Coolera Peninsula (Irish: Cúil Iorra) is a peninsula in Sligo Bay, County Sligo, Ireland. It is the most populous of County Sligo's peninsulas, and the second-largest by land area. The primary population centres on Coolera are the coastal town of Strandhill on its western shore, and Magheraboy, a suburb of Sligo town.

The peninsula is characterised by a vast network of Megalithic and Neolithic tombs, cairns and ringforts spread out across its landscape. The Carrowmore Megalithic Complex dates back to the 4th millennium BC, and is one of the largest megalithic complexes in Ireland. The 30,000-tonne tomb of Queen Médb, known as Miosgán Médhbh, sits atop Knocknarea mountain and is clearly visible from much of northern Sligo. Taken together, Sligo County Council has applied for this network of ancient monuments to be recognised as a UNESCO World Heritage Site.

In contrast to its ancient history, the peninsula's main settlement, Strandhill, was only established in the 20th century. Prior to this, locals settled inland due to the persistence of windblown sand along the coastal areas. In 1895, Belfast-native Benjamin Murrow bought up land on the west coast of Coolera. In an attempt to attract visitors to the area, he constructed a road from the inland village to the sea, and had built a bathhouse and a hotel by 1913. This road, which ran uphill from the beach strand to the village, gave the town its English-language name, Strandhill. Today, the town is one of County Sligo's top tourist destinations, and has a number of hotels, bars, a golf course and the National Surf Centre, which opened in 2023.

The 20th century saw the westward growth of Sligo town, and the suburban area of Magheraboy is also located on the Coolera Peninsula. The R292 road loops around the coastline of the peninsula, and connects Strandhill to Sligo town and Ballysadare.

== Places of interest ==
- Ballysadare Bay Natural Heritage Area
- Carrowmore Megalithic Complex
- Cloverhill Megalthic Chamber
- Coney Island
- Cullenamore Beach
- Killaspugbrone Ruins
- Knocknarea
- Lisheen House
- Maguins Island
- Miosgán Médhbh
- The Nun's Beach
- Rathcarrick Wood
- Rinn Ringforts
- Seafield House
- Seaweed Baths
- Sligo Airport
- Strandhill Beach
- Strandhill Golf Club

== Gallery ==
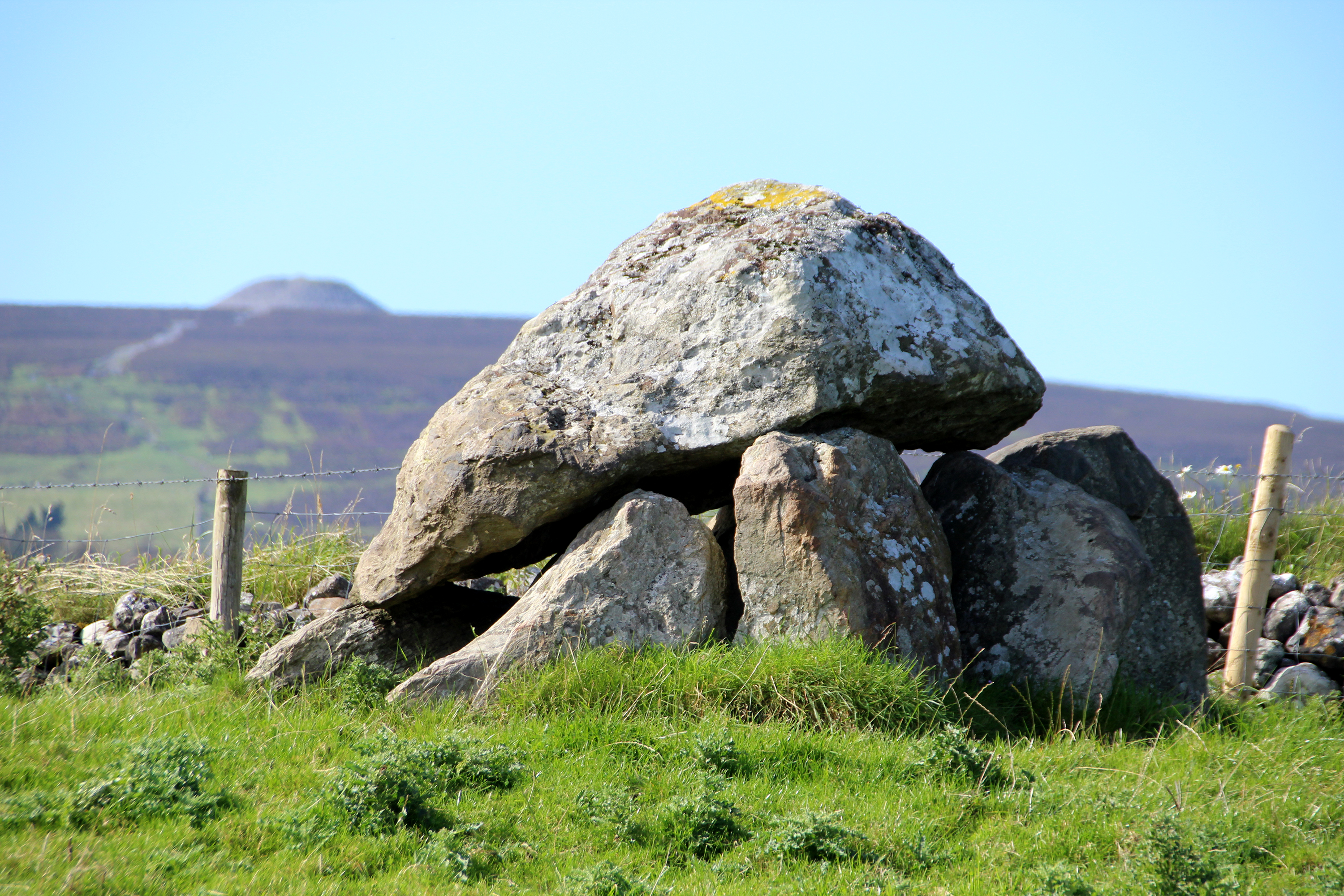
Carrowmore Passage Tomb

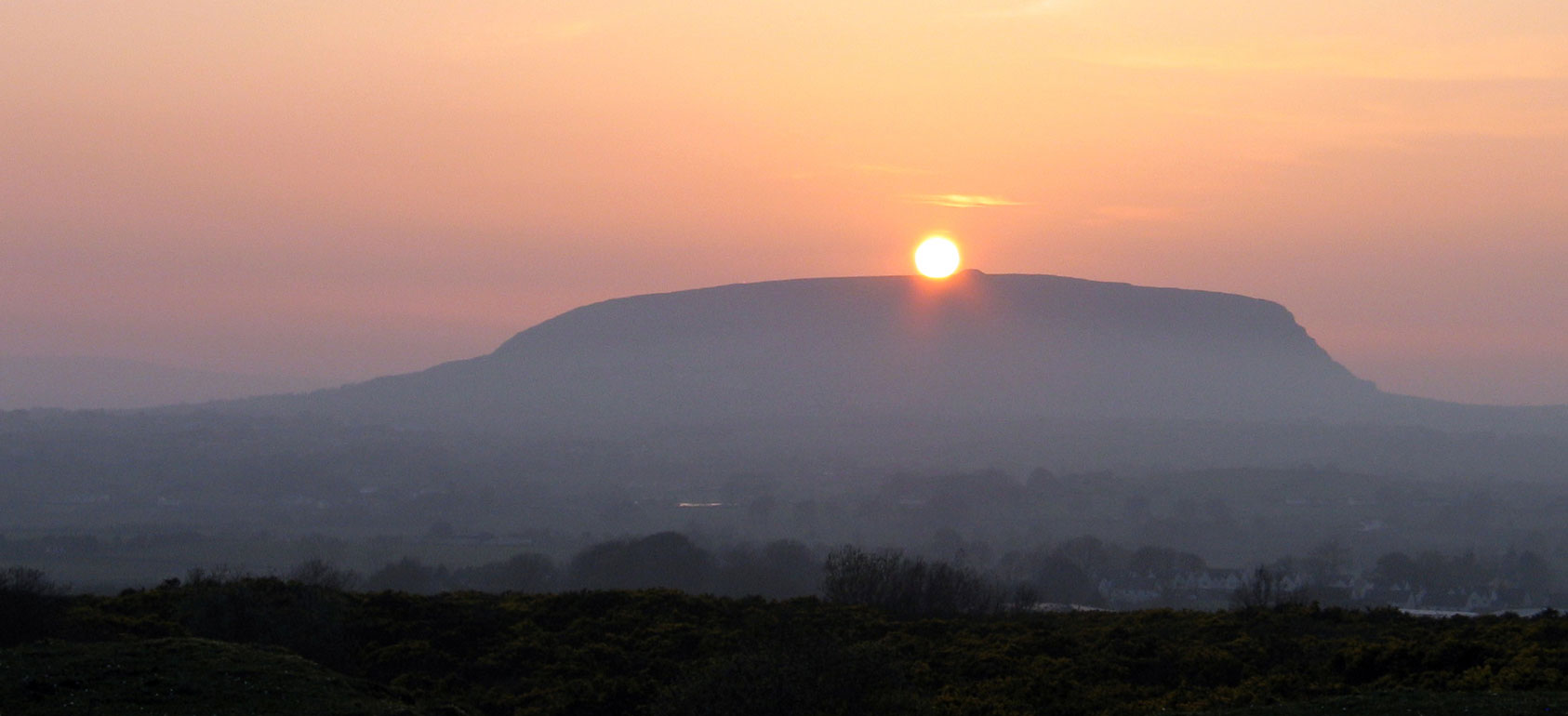
Knocknarea

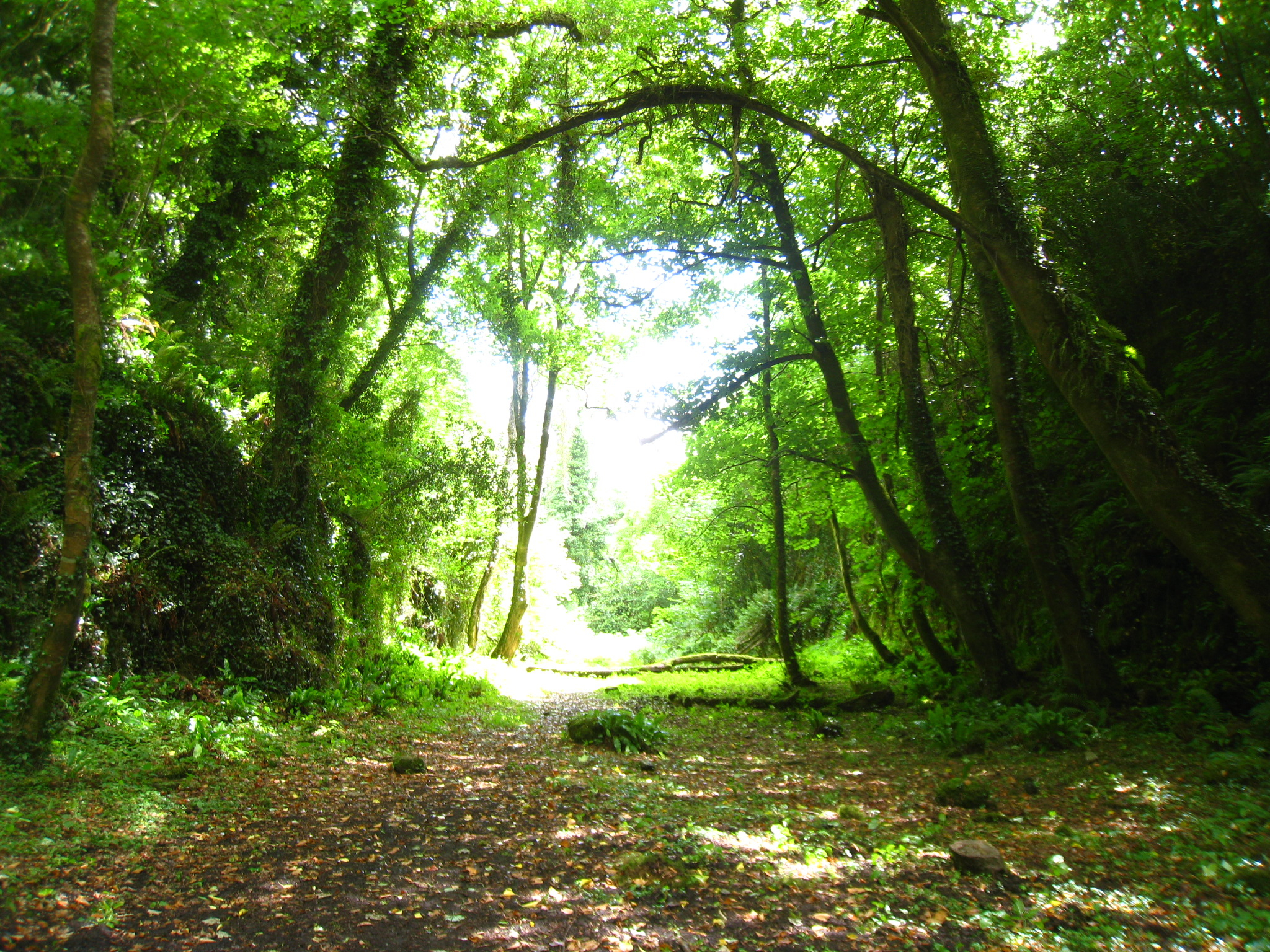
The Glen

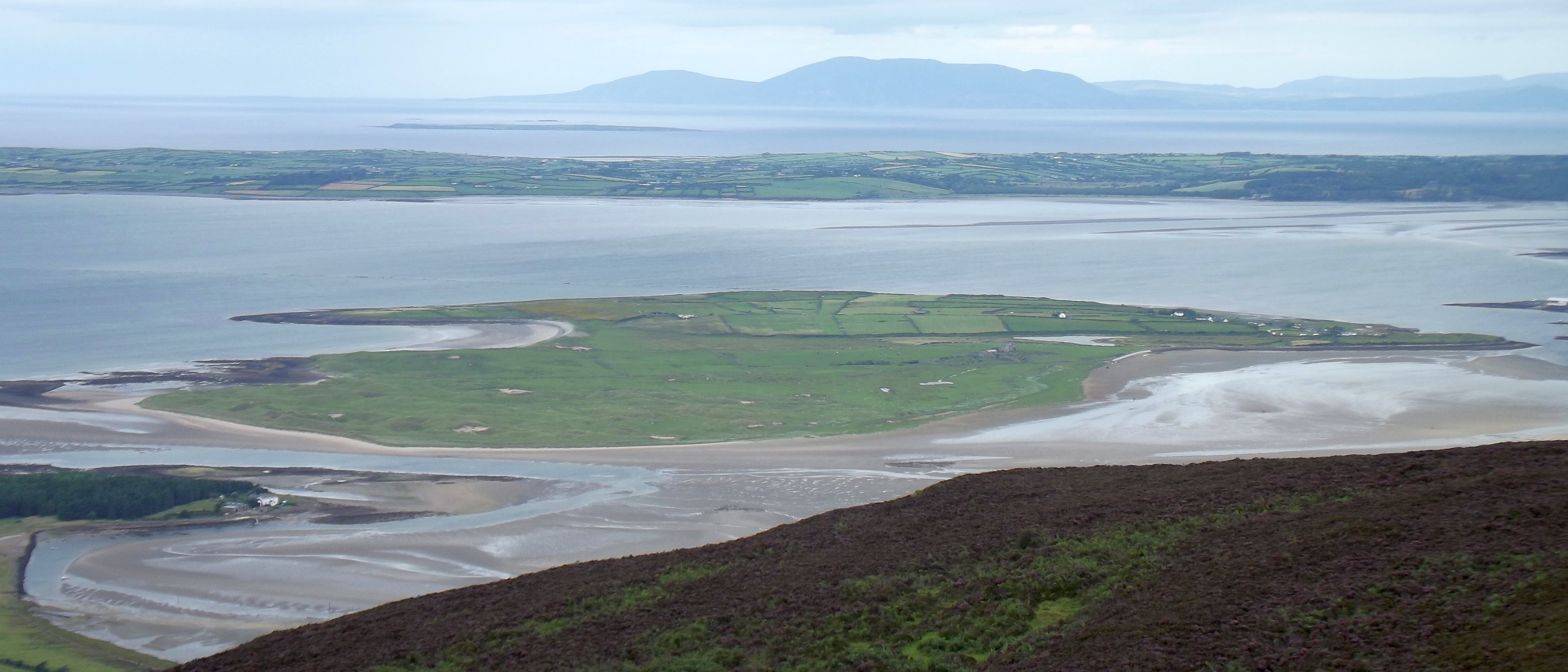
Coney Island

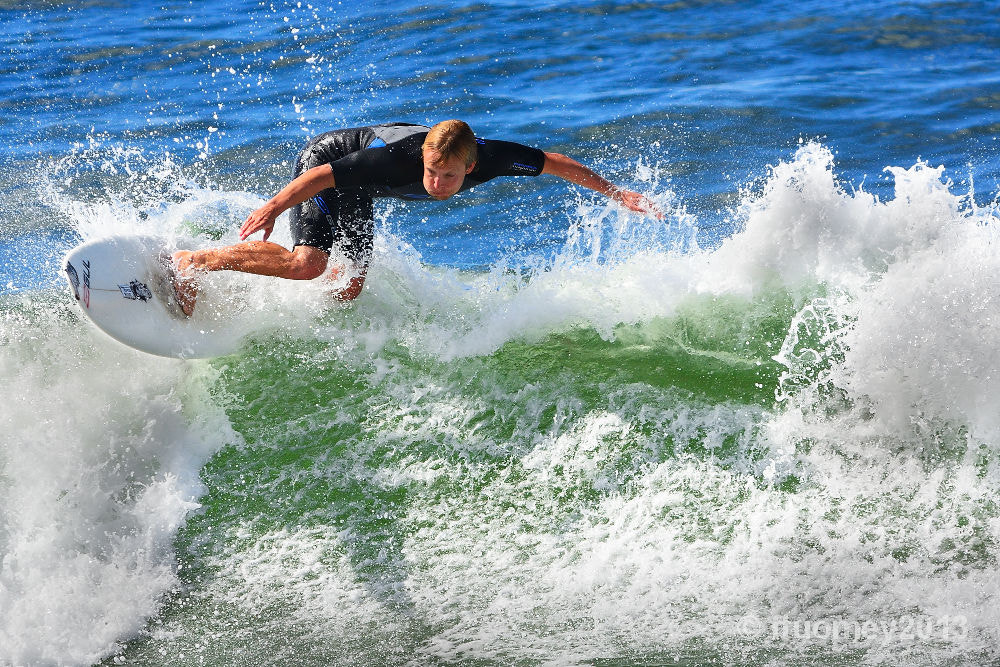
Surfer at Strandhill

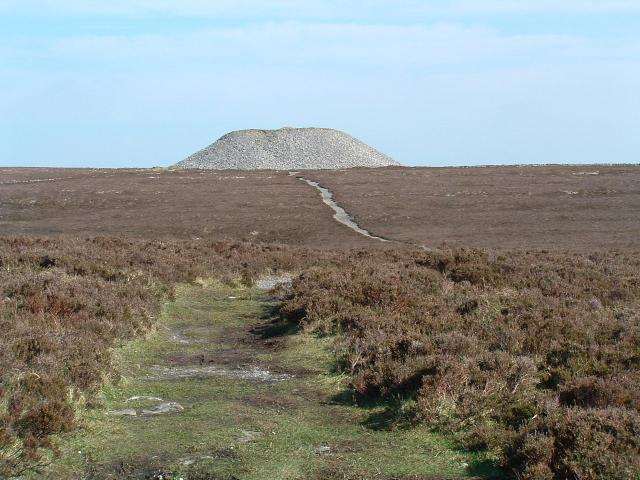
Queen Méabh's Cairn

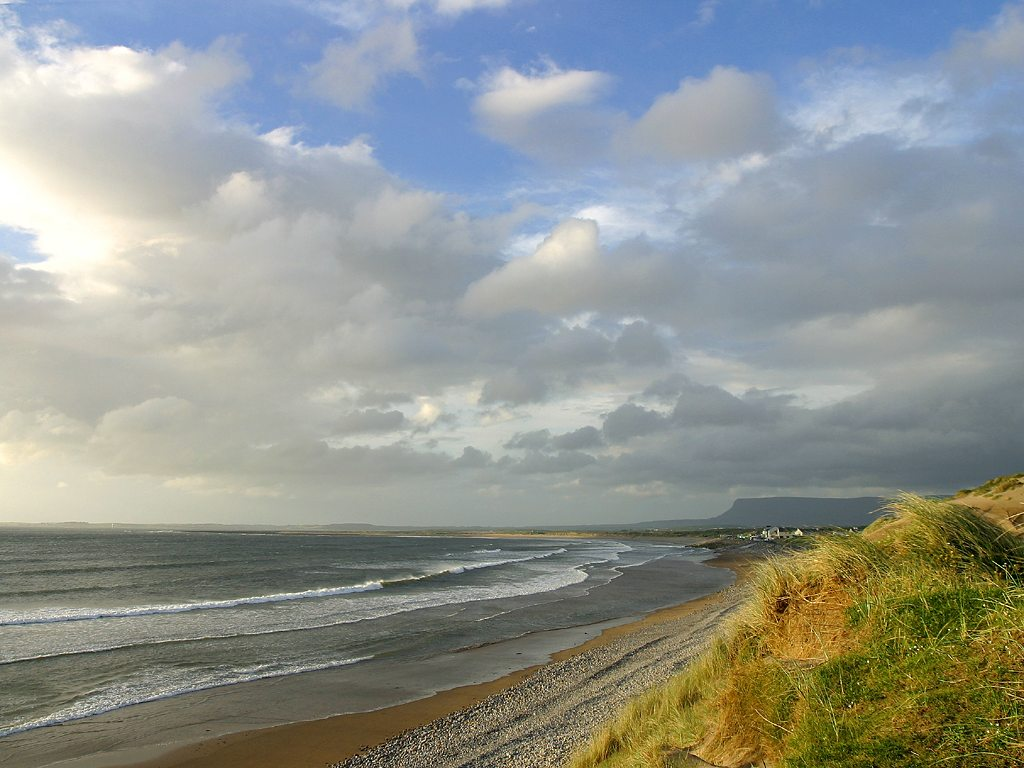
Strandhill Beach

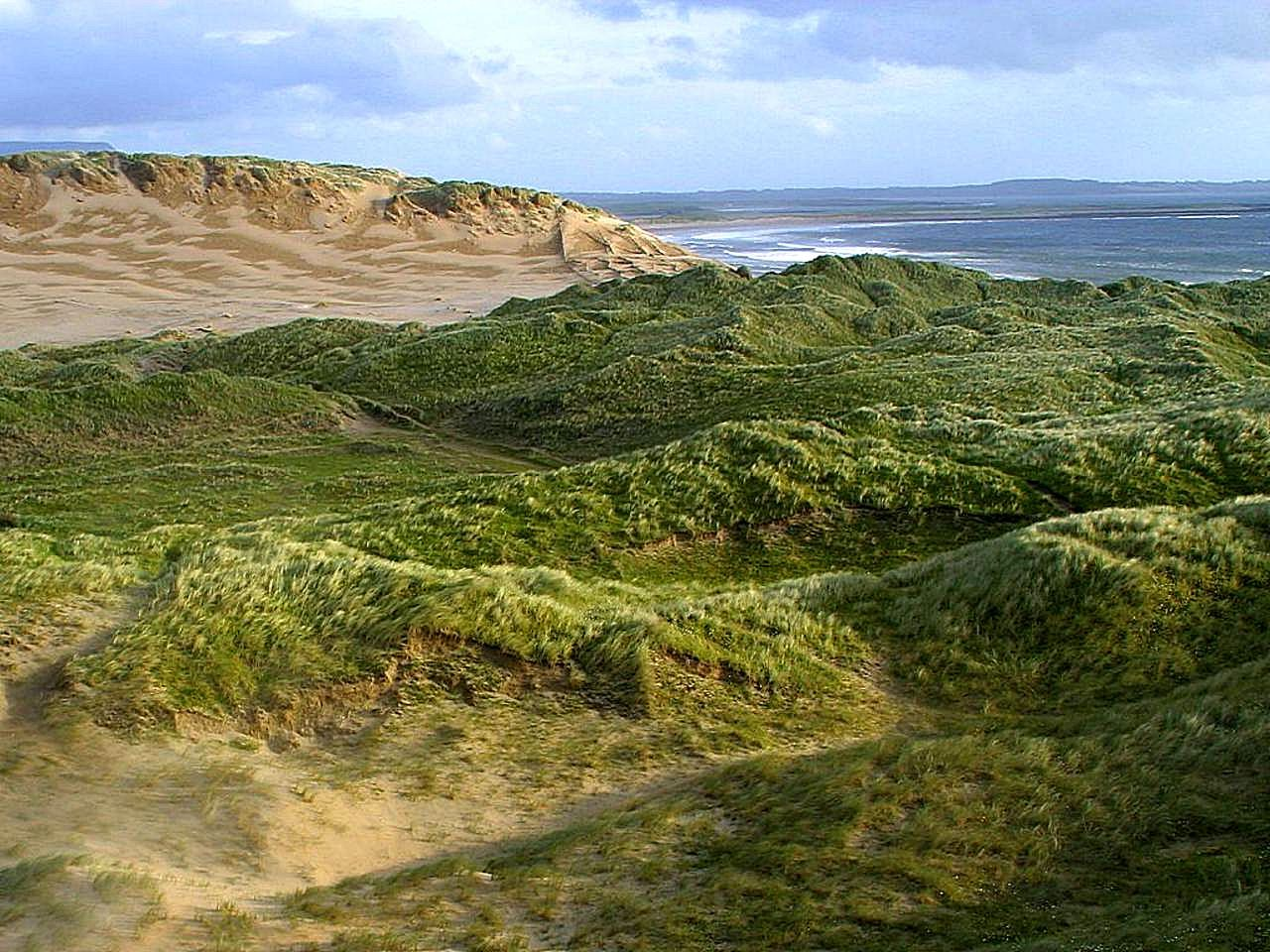
Dunes at Strandhill Golf Club

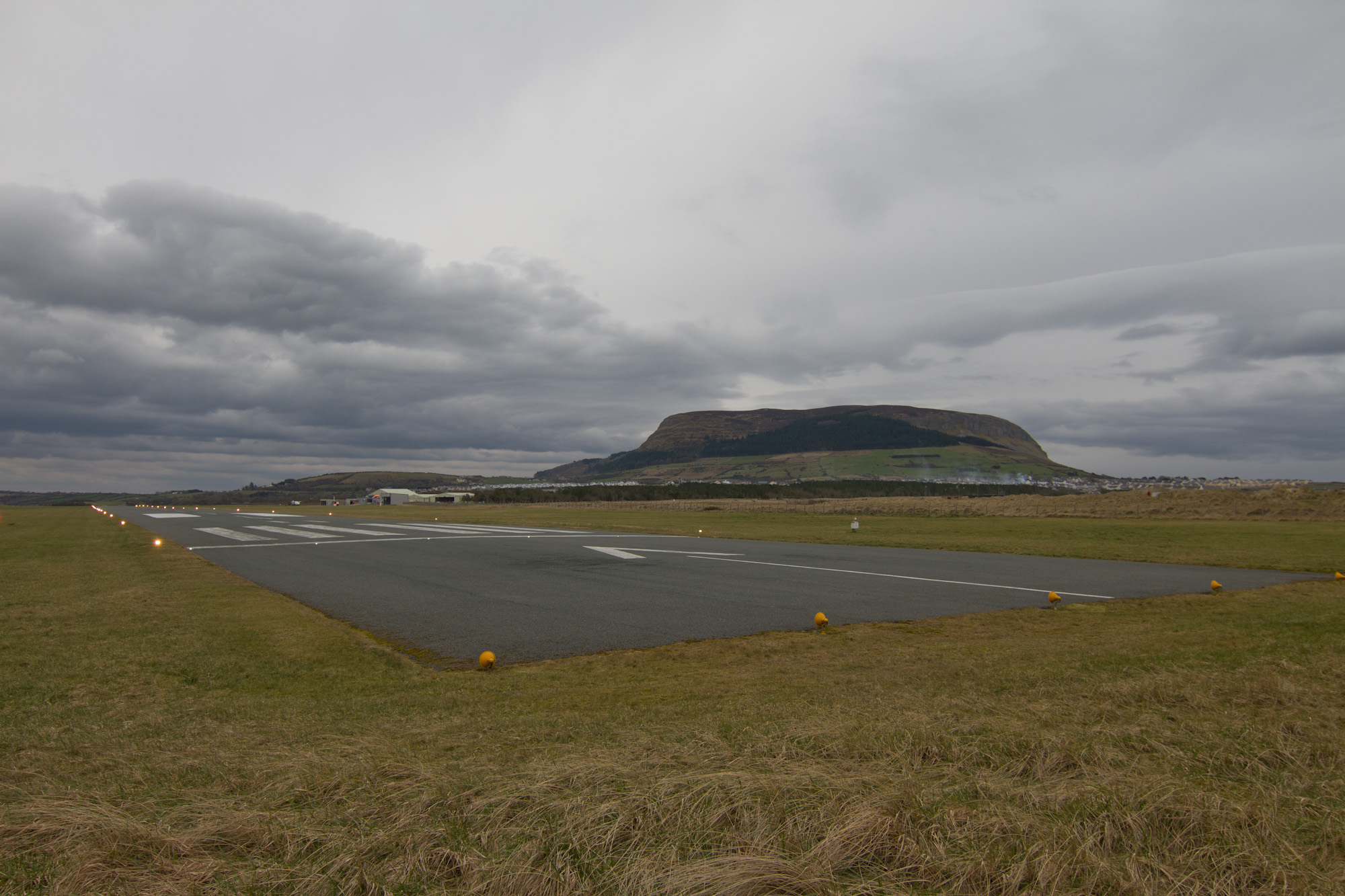
Sligo Airport

== See also ==
- Carbury, County Sligo
- Coastal landforms of Ireland
