= Knocknarea =

Hill in County Sligo, Ireland

- Cnoc na Riabh
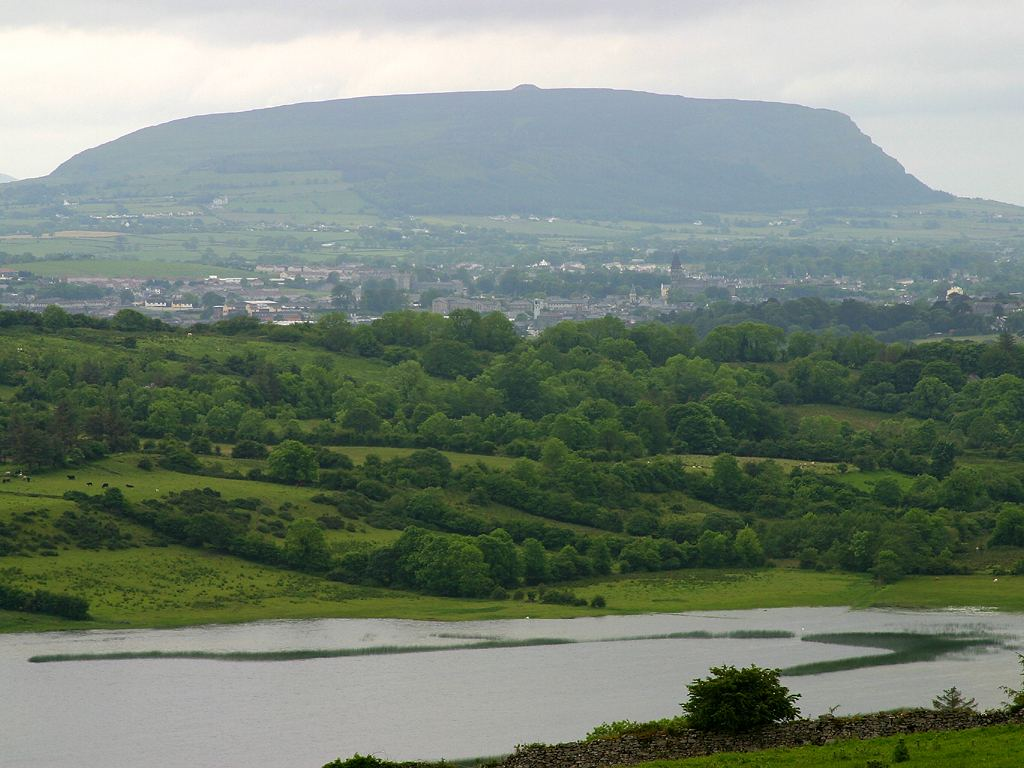

Highest point
- Elevation: 327 m (1,073 ft)
- Prominence: 312 m (1,024 ft)
- Isolation: 9.02 km (5.60 mi)
- Listing: Marilyn
- Coordinates: 54°15′32″N 8°34′29″W

Geography
- Location within island of Ireland
- Location: County Sligo, Ireland
- OSI/OSNI grid: G626346
- Topo map: OSi Discovery 16, 25

Geology
- Mountain type: limestone

Climbing
- Easiest route: Hike

Knocknarea (/nɒknəˈreɪ/; Irish: Cnoc na Riabh) is a large prominent hill west of Sligo town in County Sligo, Ireland, with a height of 327 metres (1,073 ft). Knocknarea is visually striking as it has steep limestone cliffs and stands on the Coolera Peninsula overlooking the Atlantic coast. At the summit is one of Ireland's largest cairns, known as Queen Maeve's Cairn, which is believed to contain a Neolithic passage tomb. In recent years there has been concern that the ancient cairn, a protected National Monument, is being damaged by climbers. There are also remains of several smaller tombs on the summit. Knocknarea overlooks the Carrowmore tombs and is thought to have been part of an ancient ritual landscape (see Bricklieve Mountains).

== Name ==
Knocknarea is an anglicization of an Irish name. "Knock" means hill, but the etymology of the rest of the name is disputed. The Placenames Database of Ireland gives the Irish name as Cnoc na Riabh (meaning "hill of the stripes"). However, P.W. Joyce preferred the interpretation Cnoc na Riaghadh ("hill of the executions"). Cnoc na Riogha ("hill of the kings") has also been suggested, as has Cnoc na Ré ("hill of the moon").

== Maeve's Cairn ==
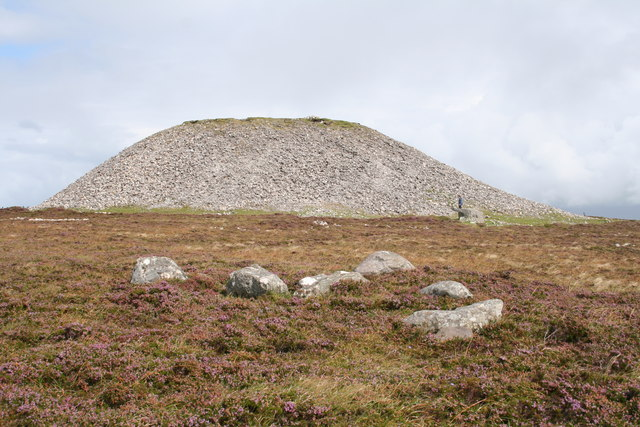
Maeve's Cairn

On the summit of Knocknarea is a large cairn about 55 metres (180 ft) wide and 10 metres (33 ft) high, making it the largest cairn in Ireland outside Brú na Bóinne in Meath. Although it has not been excavated by archaeologists, it has many features of a classic passage tomb. The cairn is flat-topped and several kerbstones can be seen on the northern side. It is believed to date to around 3000 BCE, during the Neolithic (New Stone Age). It is known in Irish as Miosgán Meadhbha (Meadhbh's heap), and in English as Maeve's Cairn or Maeve's Tomb. Meadhbh is a queen of Connacht in Irish mythology, who is believed to have originally been a goddess.

The ancient cairn is a protected National Monument. In recent years, archaeologists have warned that it is being eroded by hikers climbing on it and moving or removing stones. The large number of climbers is leaving scars on the cairn and may be destabilizing the tomb inside. Irish folklore holds that it is bad luck to damage or disrespect such tombs and that doing so could bring a curse.

== Other monuments ==
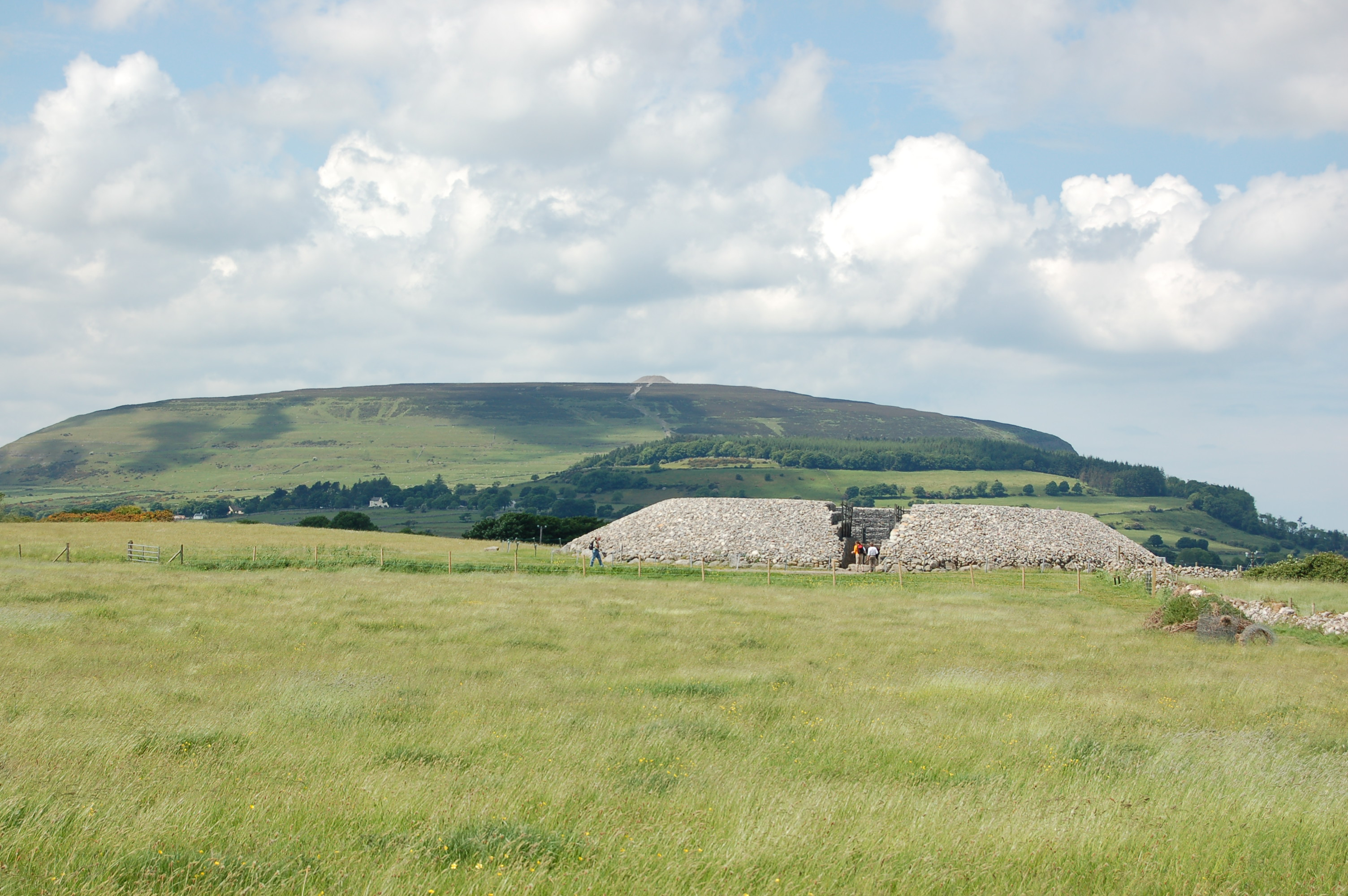
Listoghil (part of Carrowmore) with Knocknarea in the background

There are remains of several other ancient monuments on the summit of Knocknarea. Most appear to have been small passage tombs and burial mounds. The largest is a partially-ruined cruciform passage grave about 50m north of Maeve's Cairn. In general, the tombs are lined up North–South, and they may have been built to face the Carrowmore passage tombs to the east of Knocknarea. Some were severely damaged by the excavations of antiquarians in the 19th century.

Knocknarea seems to have been a major place of ritual and meeting in the Neolithic era. The entire hilltop on the eastern side is circumscribed by a 1-kilometre (0.6 mi)-long embankment, 2 metres (2 yd) wide and 0.8 metres (3 ft) tall. Hut sites have been found inside this enclosure. A large amount of debris from making stone tools has been collected.

The area around Sligo Bay is rich in pre-historic remains, and shares similar monuments and natural shapes. From Knocknarea can be seen other sites such as Croaghaun Mountain, Carrowkeel Megalithic Cemetery, and Cairns Hill. Carrowmore passage tomb cemetery is at the eastern foot of Knocknarea.
