= Loughcrew =

Ancient cemetery in County Meath, Ireland

- Loch Craobh (Irish)
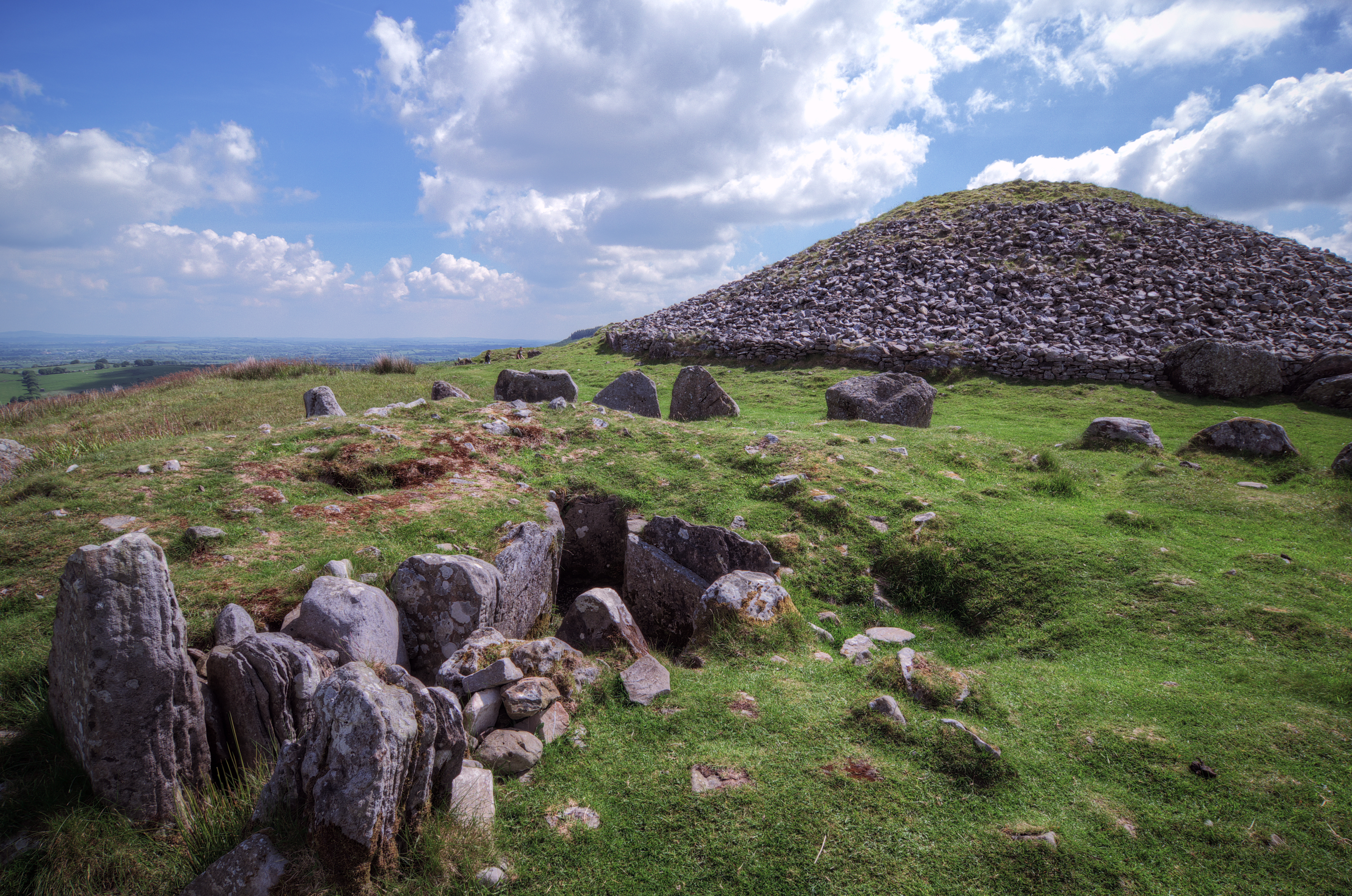

- Location within Ireland
- Type: passage grave
- Periods: Neolithic
- Location: County Meath, Ireland

National monument of Ireland
- Official name: Loughcrew Megalithic Cemetery
- Reference no.: 290 & 155

Loughcrew or Lough Crew (Irish: Loch Craobh, meaning 'lake of the tree') is an area of historical importance near Oldcastle, County Meath, Ireland. It is home to a group of ancient tombs from the 4th millennium BC, some decorated with rare megalithic art, which sit on top of a range of hills. The hills and tombs are together known as Slieve na Calliagh (Sliabh na Caillí) and are the highest point in Meath. It is one of the four main passage tomb cemeteries in Ireland and is a protected National Monument. The area is also home to the Loughcrew Estate, from which it is named.

== The tombs ==
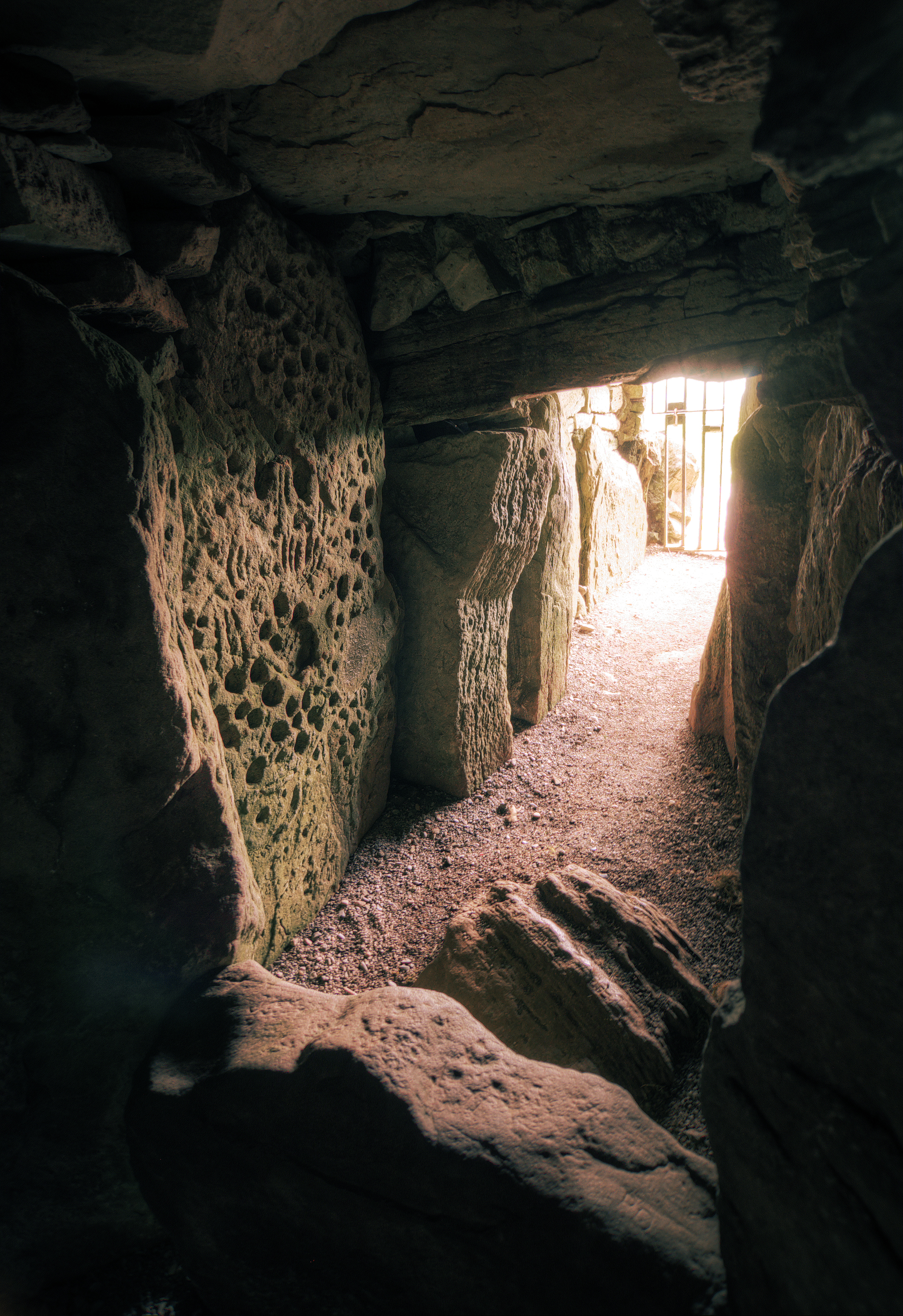
The inner passage of Cairn T

There are remains of more than thirty ancient tombs at Loughcrew. It is one of the four main passage tomb cemeteries in Ireland along with Brú na Bóinne, Carrowkeel and Carrowmore. The megalithic monuments are spread across four hilltops: Carnbane East, Carnbane West, Carrickbrack and Patrickstown Hill. These hills and the tombs themselves are together known as Slieve na Calliagh or Sliabh na Caillí, meaning "mountain of the Cailleach", the divine hag of Irish mythology. Legend has it that the monuments were created when a giant hag, striding across the land, dropped her cargo of large stones from her apron.

No comprehensive dating programme has been conducted there, but the monuments are estimated to date from about 3300 BC. The monuments consist of cruciform chambers, all of which would have been covered by mounds. A unique style of petroglyphs is found there, including lozenge shapes, leaf shapes, as well as circles, some surrounded by radiating lines. The orthostats and structural stones of the monuments tend to be from local green gritstone, which was soft enough to carve.

In 1980 Irish-American researcher Martin Brennan discovered that Cairn T in Carnbane East is directed to receive the beams of the rising sun on the spring and autumnal equinox - the light shining down the passage and illuminating the art on the backstone. Brennan also discovered alignments in Cairn L (53°44′36″N 7°08′03″W), Knowth, and Dowth in the Boyne Valley. The Cairn T alignment is similar to the well-known illumination at the passage tomb at Brú na Bóinne (Newgrange), which is aligned to catch the rays of the winter solstice sunrise.

Irish folklore holds that it is bad luck to damage or disrespect such tombs and that doing so could bring a curse. However, some of the Loughcrew tombs have been vandalised with graffiti, and security patrols have been put in place. 'Serious vandalism' was reported in September 2026.

== Modern history ==
In more recent centuries Loughcrew became the seat of a branch of the Norman-Irish Plunkett family, whose most famous member became the martyred St Oliver Plunkett. The family church stands in the grounds of Loughcrew Gardens. With its barren isolated location, Sliabh na Caillí became a critical meeting point throughout the Penal Laws for Roman Catholics. Even though the woods are now gone an excellent example of a Mass Rock can still be seen on the top of Sliabh na Caillí today. The Plunketts were involved in running the Irish Confederacy of the 1640s and were dispossessed in the Cromwellian Settlement of 1652. Their estate at Loughcrew was assigned by Sir William Petty to the Napier Family c.1655. The Napiers are descended from Sir Robert Napier who was Chief Baron of the Exchequer of Ireland in 1593.

The Napiers built an extensive estate of some 180,000 acres (730 km²) in north Meath in the subsequent centuries which mirrored that developed by their neighbouring Cromwellians, the Taylors of Headfort. Following a third and devastating fire, in 1964, the three Napier sons went to court and requested that the state allow the family trust to be broken up and the estate divided between the three sons. Subsequently, the house and gardens have been restored by Charles and Emily Napier, who open the gardens and run an annual opera festival.

== See also ==
- Archaeoastronomy
- List of archaeoastronomical sites by country
- List of megalithic monuments in Ireland
