= The Megalithic European =

Book by Julian Cope

- Author: Julian Cope
- Language: English
- Subject: Reference, Gazetteer
- Published: 18 October 2004, Element Books
- Publication place: United Kingdom
- Media type: Print
- Pages: 496
- ISBN: 0-00-713802-4
- OCLC: 56648115
- Preceded by: The Modern Antiquarian (1998)

The Megalithic European: The 21st Century Traveller in Prehistoric Europe (2004) is Julian Cope's second book on historic sites, this time looking at continental Europe and Ireland. Like its predecessor, The Modern Antiquarian, this book is split into a shorter, discursive introduction with the bulk of the text being a gazetteer of sites. As with The Modern Antiquarian, sites are listed alphabetically within their various sections.

== See also ==
- Megalith
- Neolithic Europe
- Dolmen
- Stone Circles
