= Miosgán Meadhbha =

Large megalithic cairn in Sligo, Ireland

Coordinates: 54.2587°N 8.5746°W

- Maeve's Cairn
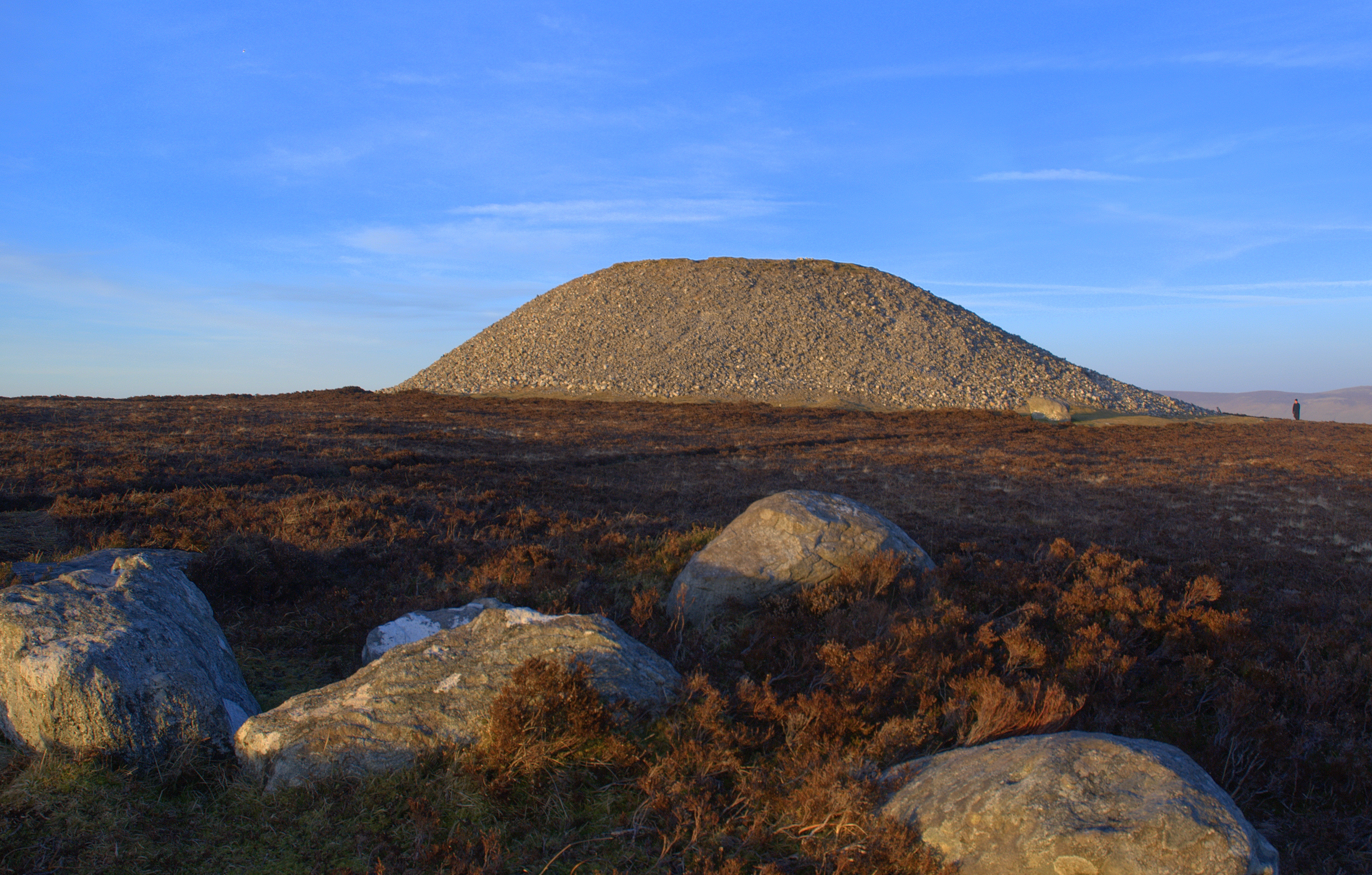
- The cairn in 2011
- Interactive map of Miosgán Meadhbha
- Location: County Sligo, Ireland

History
- Built: c. 3000 BC

Site notes
- Material: Stone
- Height: 10 m (33 ft)
- Length: 55 m (180 ft)

National monument of Ireland
- Official name: Queen Maeve's Tomb (Knocknarea)
- Reference no.: 153

Miosgán Meadhbha, anglicized Miosgan Meva and also called Maeve's Cairn, is a large cairn on the summit of Knocknarea in County Sligo, Ireland. It is thought to conceal a passage tomb from the Neolithic (New Stone Age). It is the largest cairn in Ireland, excepting those at Brú na Bóinne in Meath.

The cairn is about 55 metres (180 ft) wide and 10 metres (33 ft) high. The cairn is flat-topped and several kerbstones can be seen on the northern side. It is believed to date to around 3000 BCE. Archaeologist Stefan Bergh, in his book Landscape of the Monuments (1995), suggests that a large hollow some way to the west of the cairn was the quarry from which the stones were taken.

The cairn is a protected National Monument. In recent years, archaeologists have warned that the cairn is being eroded by hikers climbing on it and moving or removing stones. The large number of climbers is leaving scars on the cairn and may be destabilizing the tomb inside. Irish folklore holds that it is bad luck to damage or disrespect such tombs and that doing so could bring a curse.

In 2025, a feasibility study explored the use of muon tomography to image the internal structure of the cairn using cosmic-ray muons.

Miosgán Meadhbha is Irish for "Meadhbh's heap". Meadhbh is a queen of Connacht in Irish mythology, who is believed to have originally been a sovereignty goddess.
