= Niall mac Conaill =

Niall mac Conaill (died 778) was King of South Brega of the Uí Chernaig sept of the Síl nÁedo Sláine branch of the southern Ui Neill. He was the son of Conall Grant mac Cernaig (died 718) who had contended for the rule of all Brega in the 710's. He ruled in south Brega from 771 to 778.

Upon the death of Coirpre mac Fogartaig of the Uí Chernaig sept in 771 the rule of Brega was recovered by the northern sept of Uí Chonaing based at Cnogba(Knowth) in the person of Congalach mac Conaing (died 778). Niall became ruler of Deiscirt Breg or southern Brega.

Niall represented a branch of the Uí Chernaig sept called the Síl Conaill Graint which were based at Calatrium (Galtrim), whereas the main line of Uí Chernaig represented by the sons of the high king Fogartach mac Néill (died 724) were based at Lagore. The sons of Fogartach had dominated southern Brega since 737 and a claimant arose in Cummascach mac Fogartaig to challenge Niall's rule. In 777 the Battle of Calatrium was fought between Niall and Cummascach in which the vassal king Échtgus mac Baeth of the Deisi Brega was slain.

Niall was an old king and offered no threat to the high king Donnchad Midi (died 797) who was imposing his authority on Brega at this time. he was not involved in the Battle of Forchalad in 778 where Congalach of Brega was slain fighting Donnchad. Niall is called king of Deiscirt Breg in his death obit.

His sons Conall mac Néill (died 815) and Diarmait mac Néill (died 826) were also Kings of South Brega.
