= Townleyhall passage grave =

UNESCO World Heritage site in County Louth, Ireland

Townleyhall Tomb
- Tuama Pasáiste Halla an Toinlígh
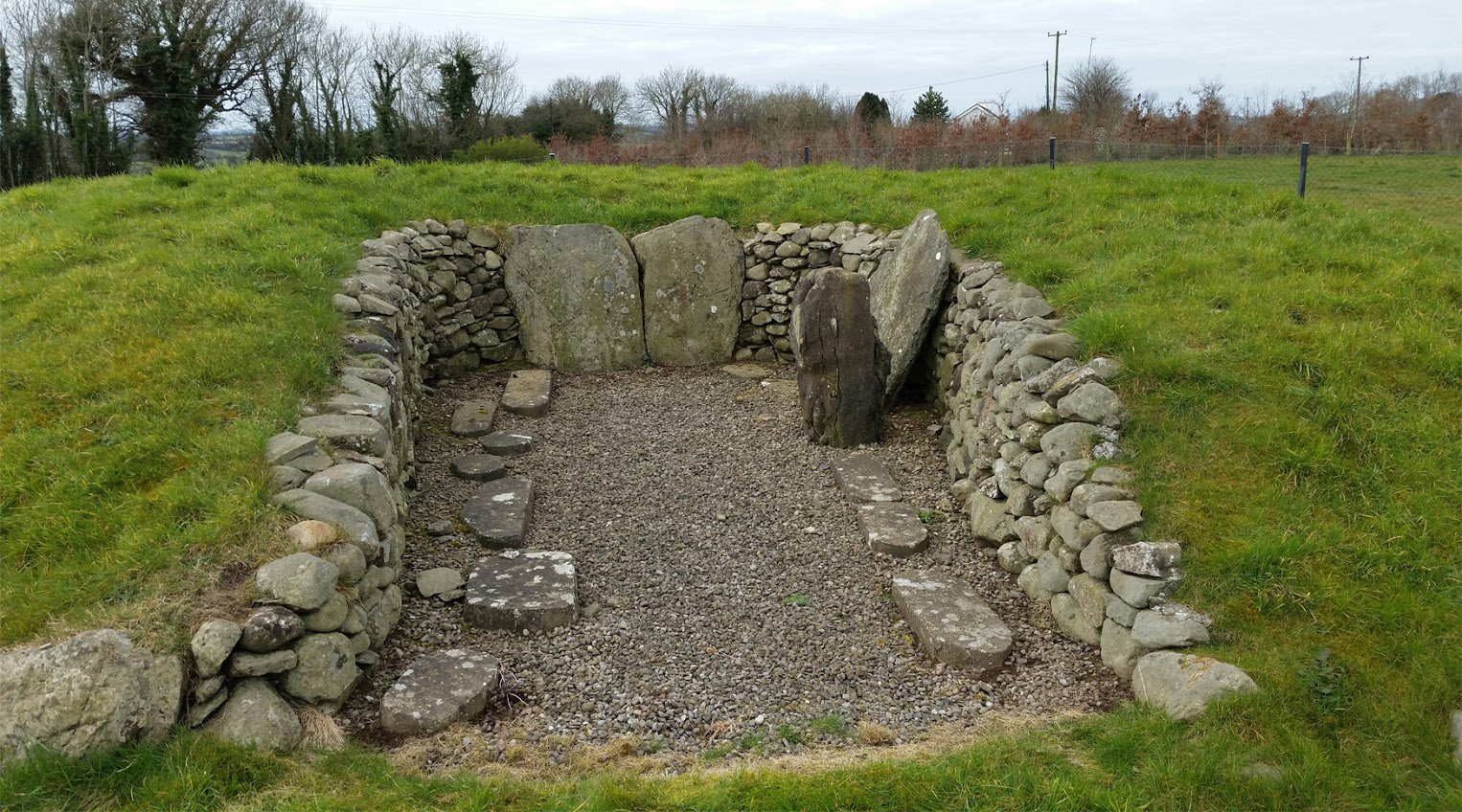
- The tomb in 2016
- Interactive map of Townleyhall Tomb
- 53°43′16″N 6°27′05″W
- Type: chamber tomb
- Periods: Neolithic
- Location: County Louth, Ireland
- Part of: Brú na Bóinne

History
- Built: c. 3000 BC

Site notes
- Material: Stone

UNESCO World Heritage Site
- Type: Cultural
- Criteria: i, iii, iv
- Designated: 1993 (17th session)
- Part of: Brú na Bóinne - Archaeological Ensemble of the Bend of the Boyne
- Reference no.: 659
- Ireland
- Region: Europe and North America

Townleyhall passage grave is a chamber tomb located around 2 km north of Dowth tomb. It is part of the megalithic complex of Brú na Bóinne in County Louth, Ireland.

It is located outside the World Heritage Site core area but (just) inside the buffer zone.

== Construction ==
The site was originally a Neolithic settlement but was abandoned by its occupants, perhaps because it was a temporary site serving the construction project or due to the death of a senior member, and turned into a passage grave. Unlike its more famous neighbours in the Boyne valley, the tomb consists of a single chamber that merges with the entrance passage making it an undifferentiated passage grave.

== Excavation ==
Townleyhall was excavated by George Eogan in 1962, work which found Carrowkeel ware pottery providing the first indication that Ireland's passage graves were of Neolithic date. Following this many of the other sites in the area were dug, although the methods used at the time would be considered crude by today's standards.

== Gallery ==
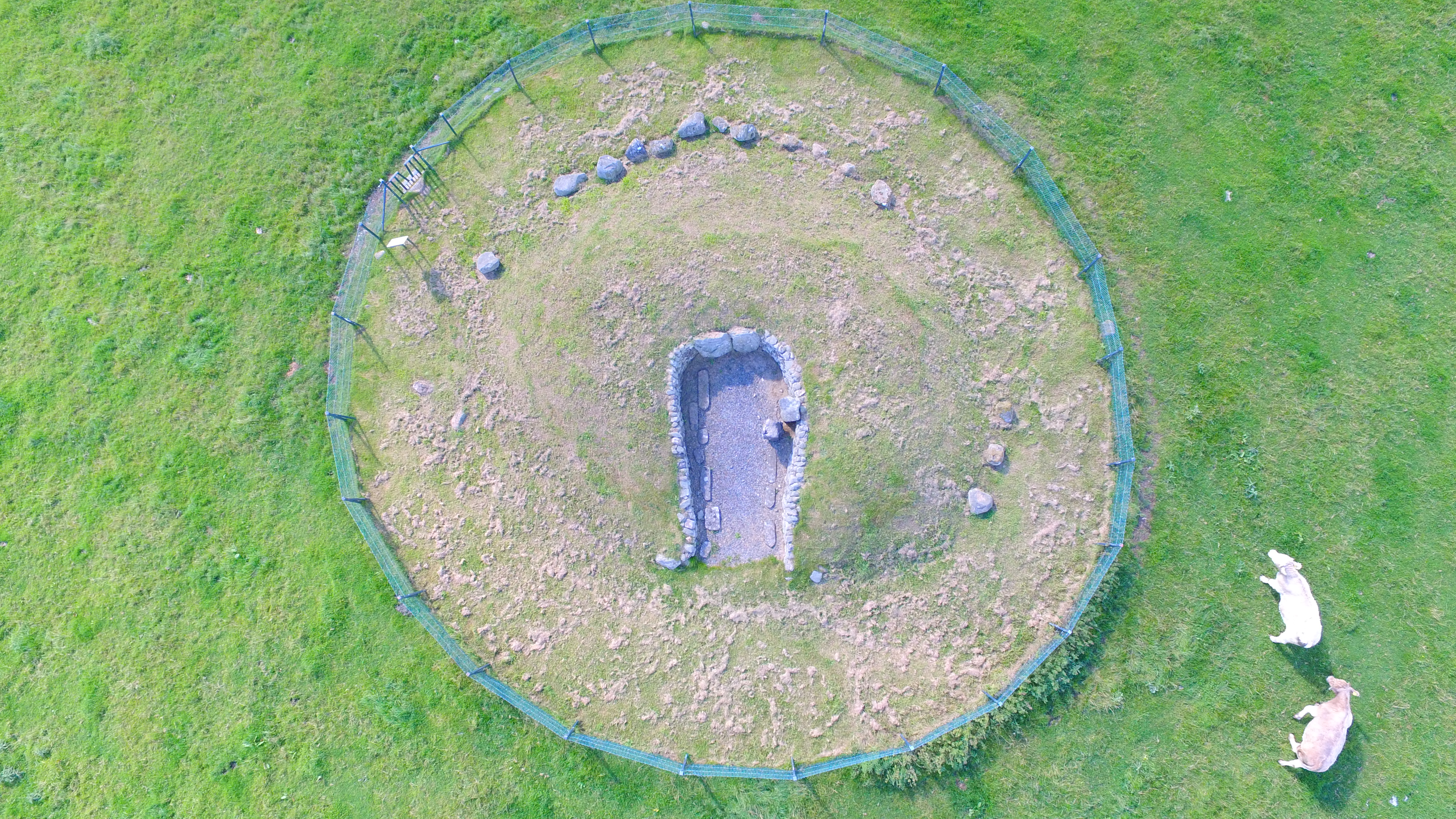
Townleyhall Tomb from above

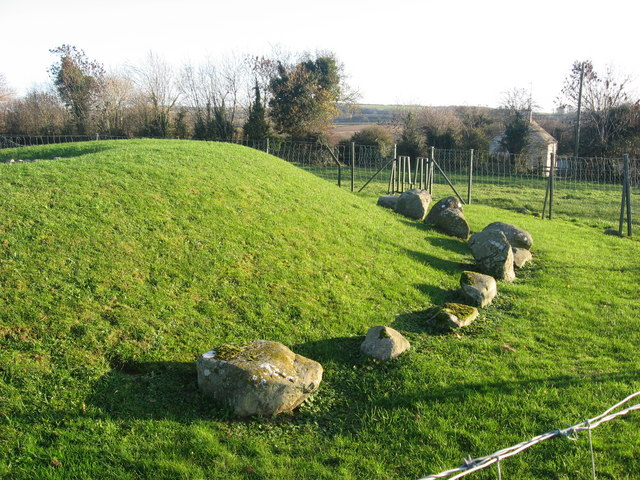
Side view
