= Brú na Bóinne =

Archaeological site in County Meath, Ireland

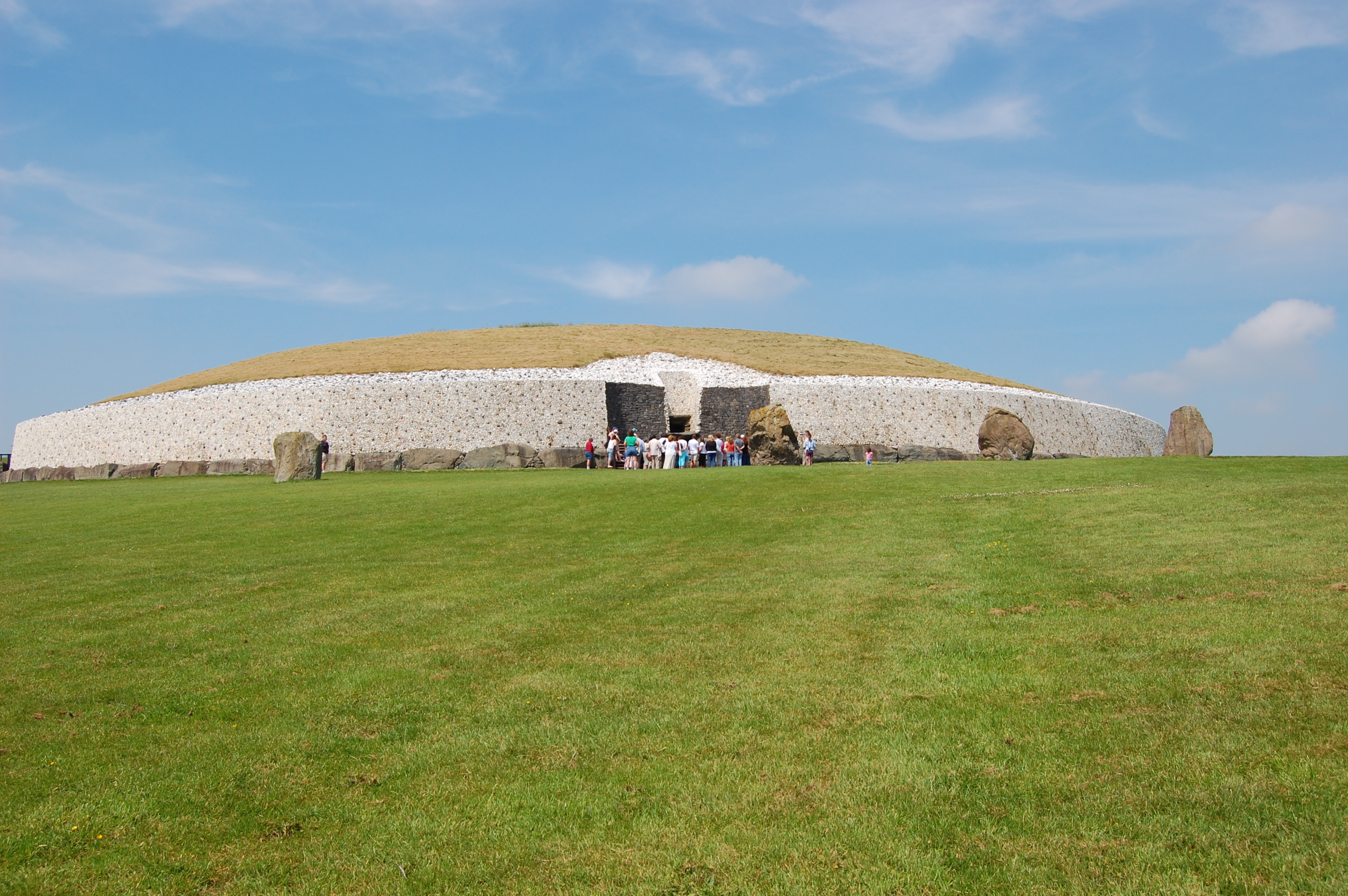
- Newgrange passage tomb

- Location in Ireland
- 53.69284°N 6.44932°W
- Type: Archaeological site
- Location: County Meath, Ireland

History
- Built: c. 3300 BC
- Abandoned: c. 2900 BC

Site notes
- Area: 780 ha (1,900 acres)

UNESCO World Heritage Site
- Type: Cultural
- Criteria: i, iii, iv
- Designated: 1993 (17th session)
- Part of: Brú na Bóinne - Archaeological Ensemble of the Bend of the Boyne
- Reference no.: 659

Brú na Bóinne (Irish: [ˈbˠɾˠuː n̪ˠə ˈbˠoːn̠ʲə], "mansion or palace of the Boyne"), also called the Boyne Valley tombs, is an ancient monument complex and ritual landscape in County Meath, Ireland, located in a bend of the River Boyne. It is one of the world's most important Neolithic landscapes, comprising at least ninety monuments including passage tombs, burial mounds, standing stones and enclosures. The site is dominated by the passage tombs of Newgrange (Sí an Bhrú), Knowth (Cnogbha) and Dowth (Dubhadh), built during the 32nd century BC. Together these have the largest assemblage of megalithic art in Europe. The associated archaeological culture is called the "Boyne culture".

Brú na Bóinne is also an important archaeoastronomical site; several of the passage tombs are aligned with the winter solstice and equinoxes. The area continued to be a site of ritual and ceremonial activity in the later Bronze Age and Iron Age. In Irish mythology, the tombs are said to be portals to the Otherworld and dwellings of the deities, particularly The Dagda and his son Aengus. They began to be studied by antiquarians in the 18th century, and archaeological excavations began in the 20th century, when some of the passage tombs underwent restoration.

Since 1993, the site has been a World Heritage Site designated by UNESCO as "Brú na Bóinne – Archaeological Ensemble of the Bend of the Boyne".

== Location ==
The area is located eight kilometres west of Drogheda in County Meath, Ireland, in a bend of the River Boyne. It is around 40 kilometres north of Dublin.

Brú na Bóinne is surrounded on its southern, western and eastern sides by the Boyne; additionally, a small tributary of the Boyne, the River Mattock, runs along the northern edge, almost completely surrounding Brú na Bóinne with water. All but two of the prehistoric sites are on this river peninsula.

== Description ==
The area has been a centre of human settlement for at least 6,000 years, but the major structures date to around 5,000 years ago, from the Neolithic period.

The site is a complex of Neolithic mounds, chamber tombs, standing stones, henges and other prehistoric enclosures. The site predates the Egyptian pyramids and was built with sophistication and a knowledge of science and astronomy, which is most evident in the passage grave of Newgrange. The site is often referred to as the "Bend of the Boyne" and this is often (incorrectly) taken to be a translation of Brú na Bóinne. The associated archaeological culture is often called the Boyne culture.

The site covers 780 ha (1,927 acres) and contains around 40 passage graves, as well as other prehistoric sites and later features. The majority of the monuments are concentrated on the north side of the river. The most well-known sites within Brú na Bóinne are the passage graves of Newgrange, Knowth and Dowth, all known for their collections of megalithic art. Each stands on a ridge within the river bend and two of the tombs, Knowth and Newgrange, appear to contain stones re-used from an earlier monument at the site. Newgrange is the central mound of the Boyne Valley passage grave cemetery, the circular cairn in which the cruciform burial chamber is sited having a diameter of over 100 metres. Knowth and Dowth are of comparable size. There is no in situ evidence for earlier activity at the site, save for the spotfinds of flint tools left by Mesolithic hunters.

The passage tombs were constructed beginning around 3300 BC and work stopped around 2900 BC. The three largest tombs of Newgrange, Knowth and Dowth may have been constructed to be visible from each other and from northern and southern approaches along the River Boyne, as part of a scheme to "bind the previously disparate elements of the extended passage tomb cemetery into a more clearly defined prehistoric numinous precinct". The area continued to be used for habitation and ritual purposes until the early Bronze Age, during which a number of embanked, pit and wooden post circles (collectively referred to as "henges") were built. Artifacts from the later Bronze Age are comparatively inconspicuous: some cist and ring ditch burials and burnt mounds. For the Iron Age there is only evidence of sporadic activity, such as burials near Knowth and at Rosnaree. Valuable items from the Roman period such as coins and jewelry were found as votive offerings near Newgrange.

Numerous other enclosure and megalith sites have been identified within the river bend and have been given simple letter designations, such as the M Enclosures. In addition to the three large tombs, several other ceremonial sites constitute the complex including:

- Cloghalea Henge
- Townleyhall passage grave
- Monknewtown henge and ritual pond
- Newgrange cursus
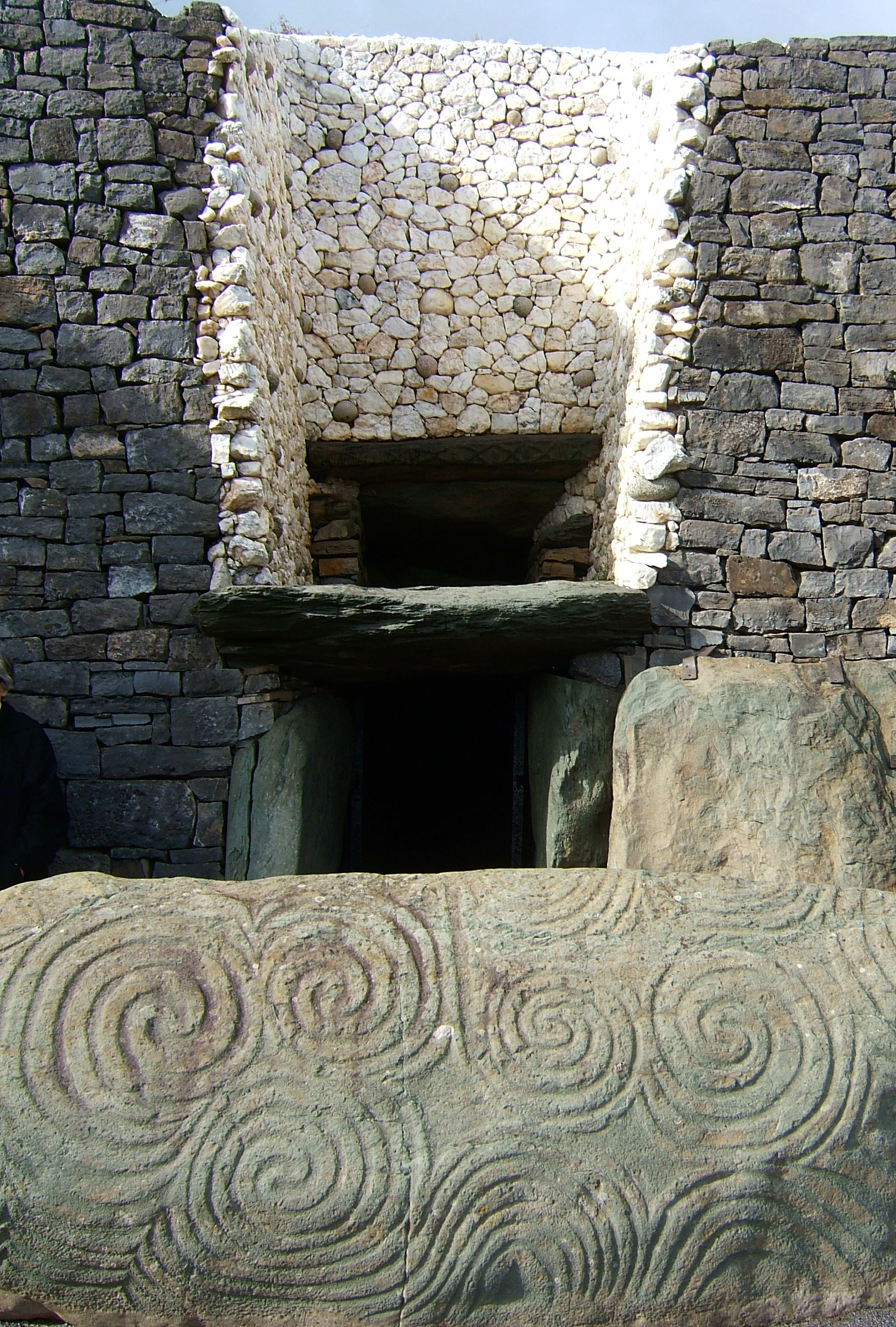
Newgrange entrance

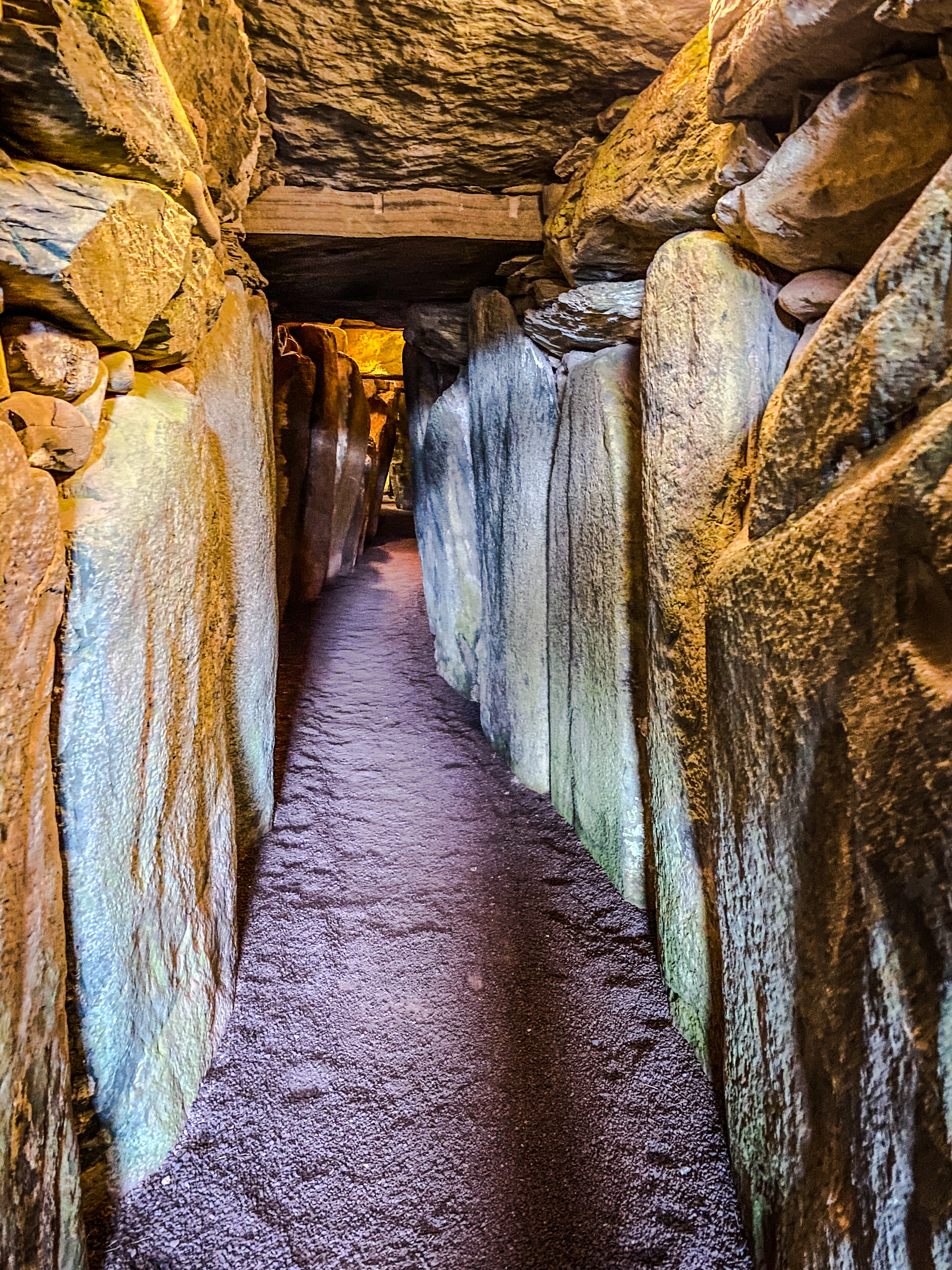
Newgrange passageway

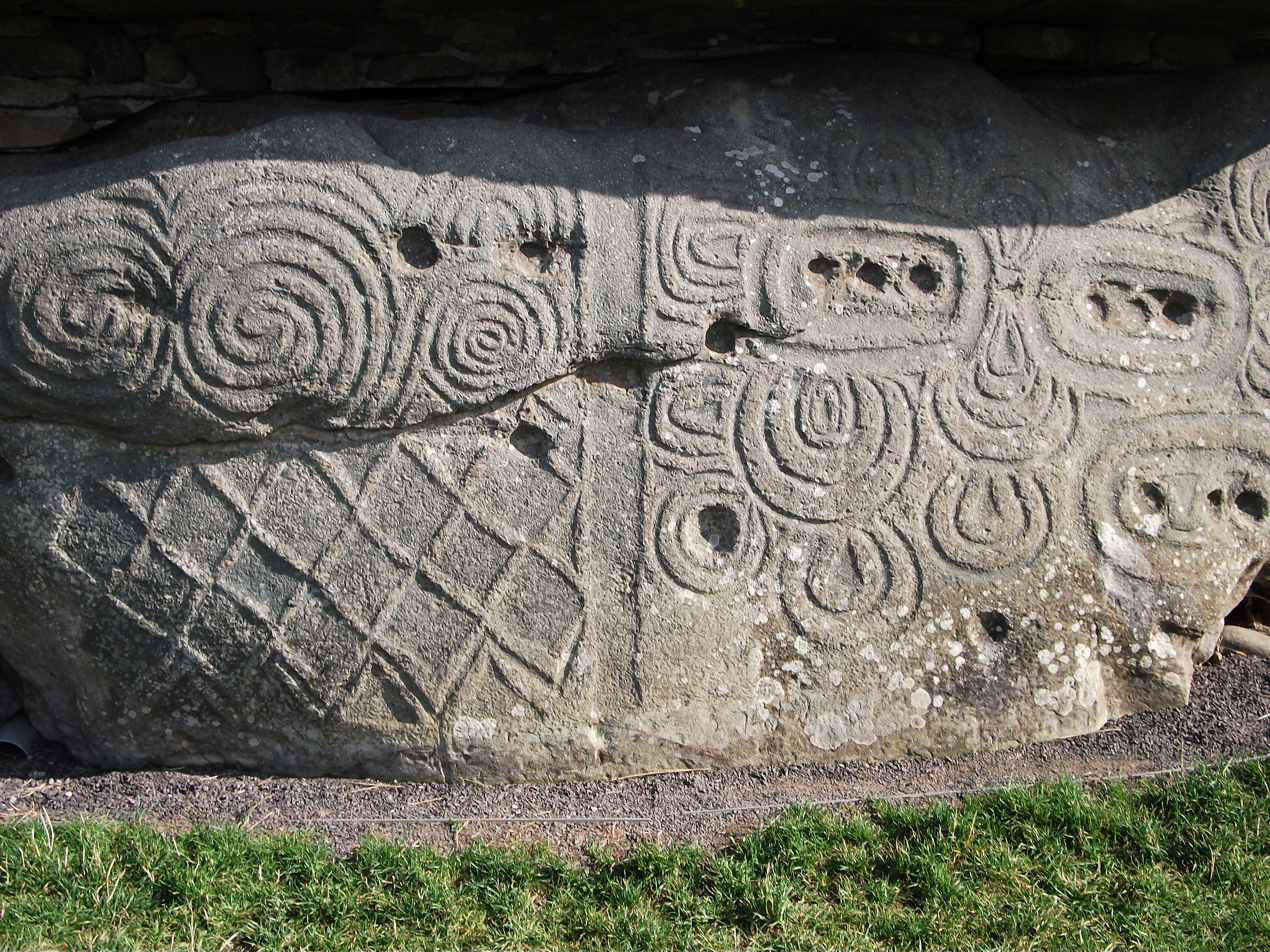
Megalithic art on Newgrange kerbstone

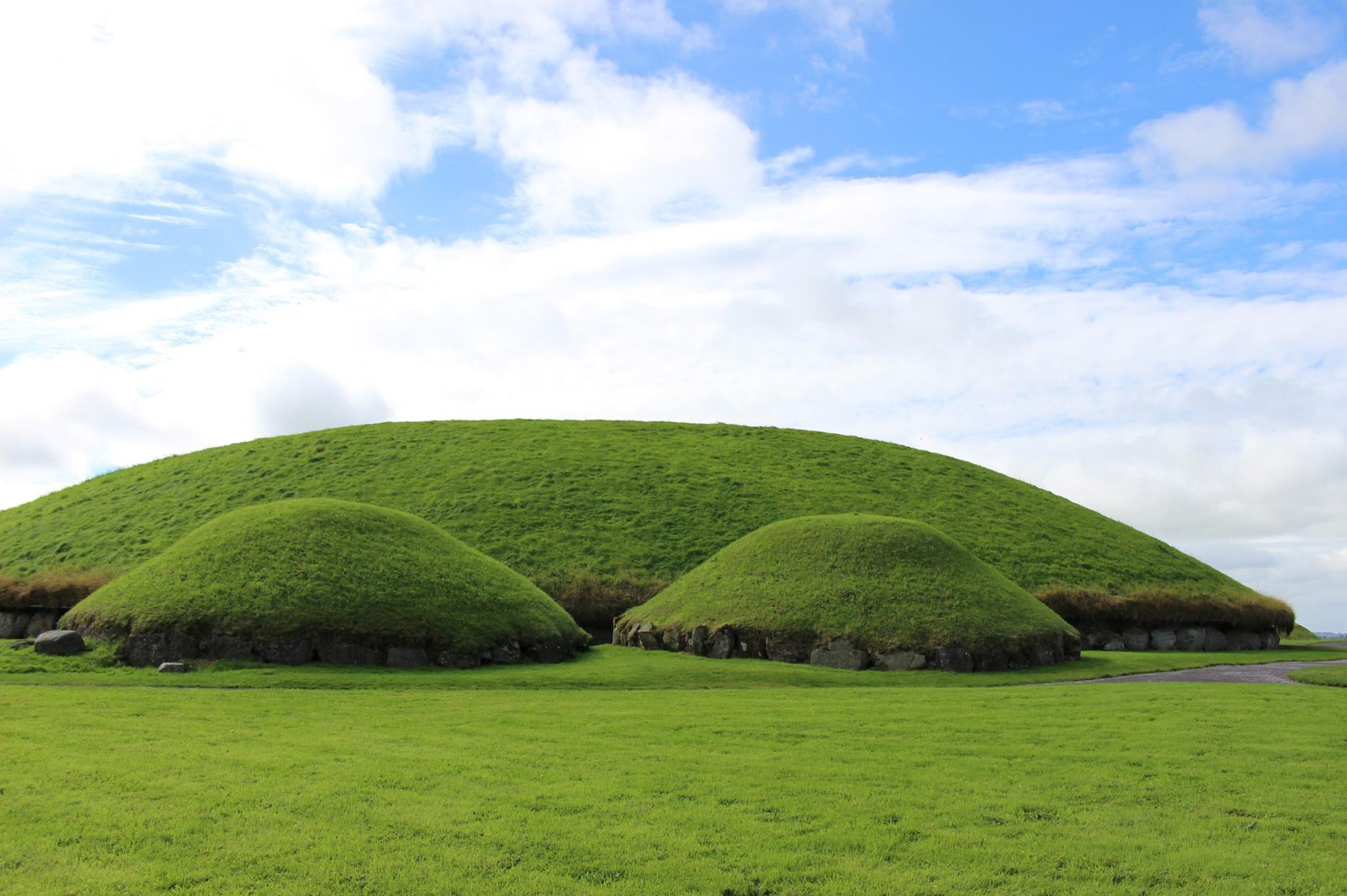
Knowth

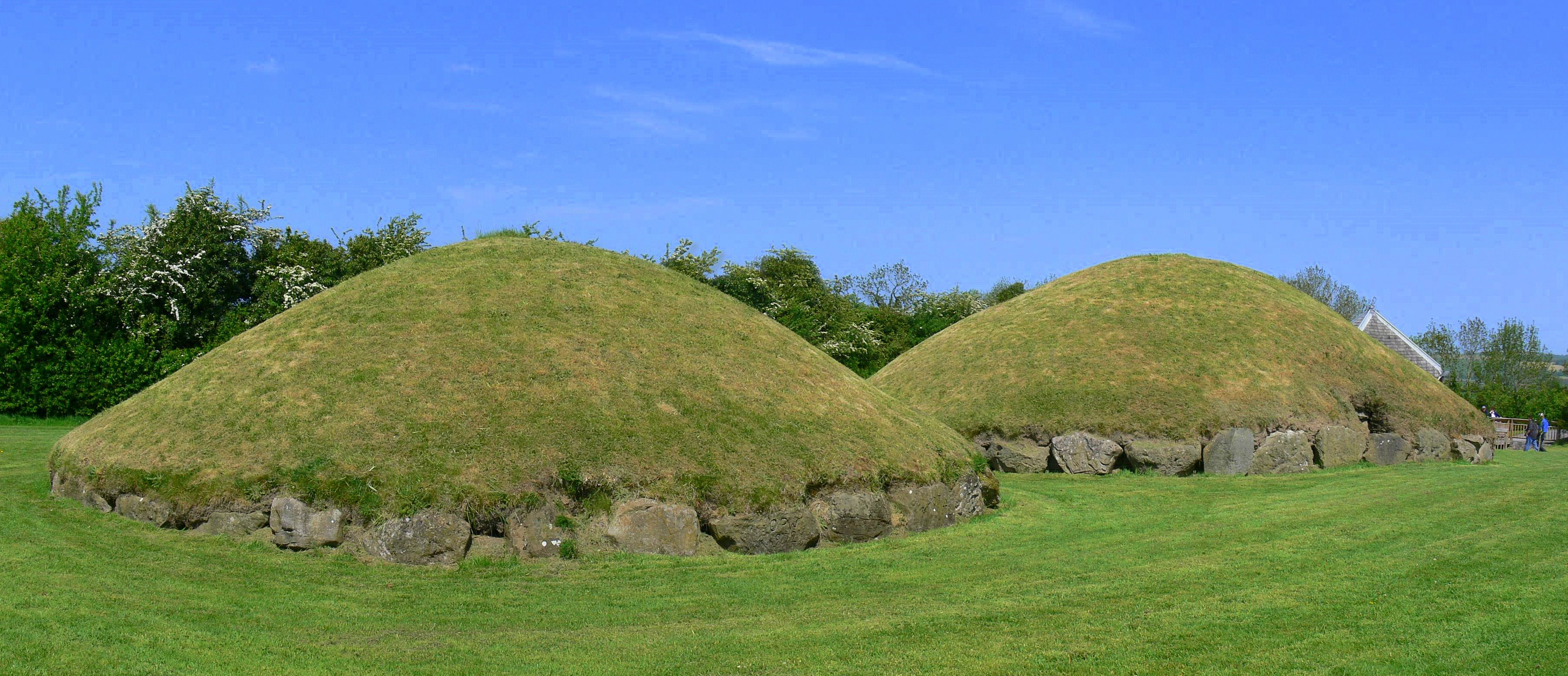
Knowth

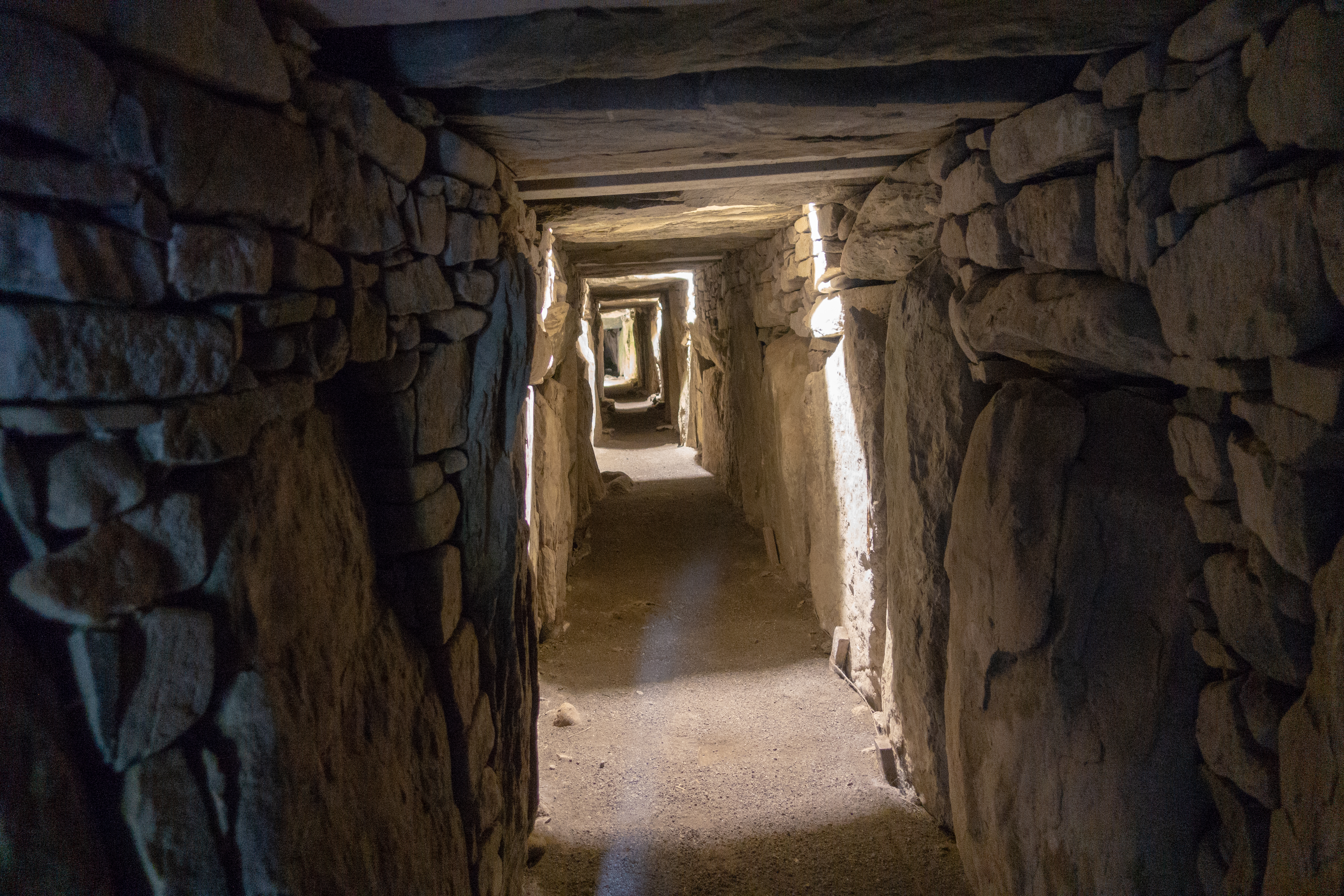
Knowth passageway

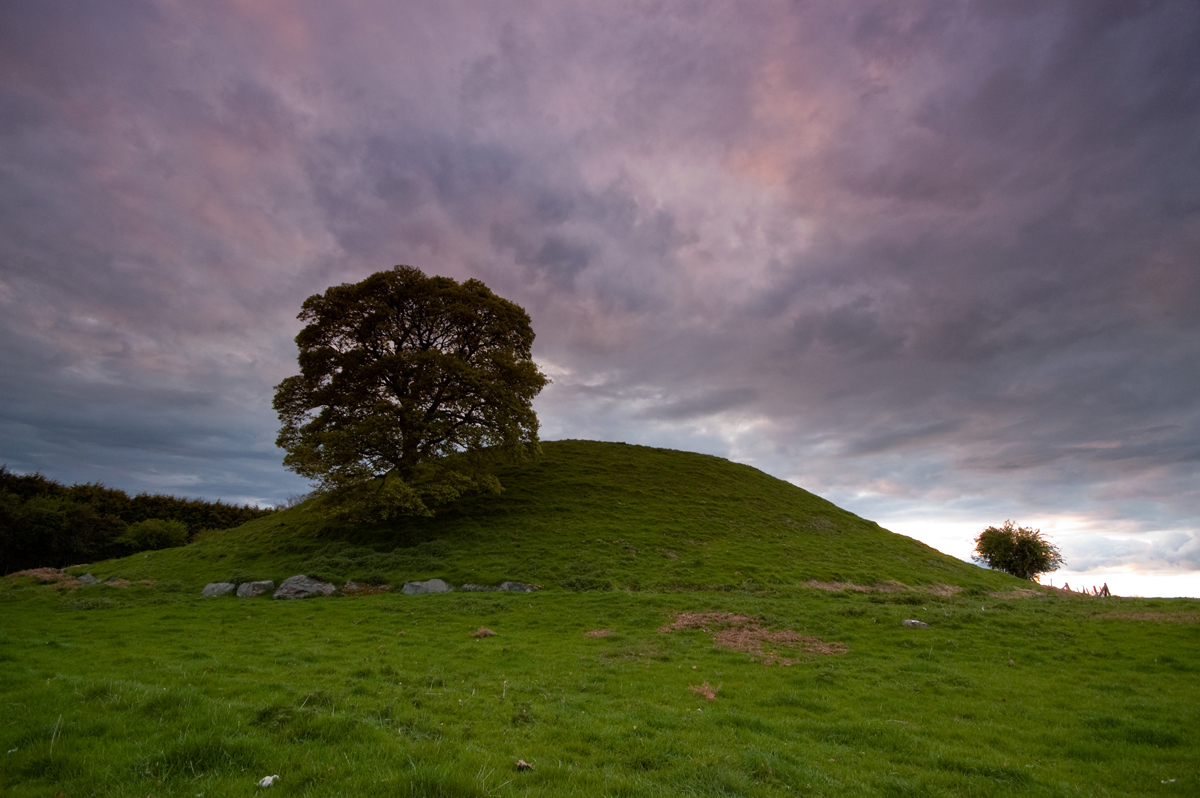
Dowth

=== Astronomical alignments ===
Each of the three main megalith sites have significant archaeoastronomical significance. Newgrange and Dowth have winter solstice solar alignments, while Knowth is oriented towards the March equinox (spring equinox) and the September equinox (autumn equinox). In addition, the immediate environs of the main sites have been investigated for other possible alignments. The layout and design of the Brú na Bóinne complex across the valley has also been studied for astronomical significance.

== Brú na Bóinne Visitor Centre ==
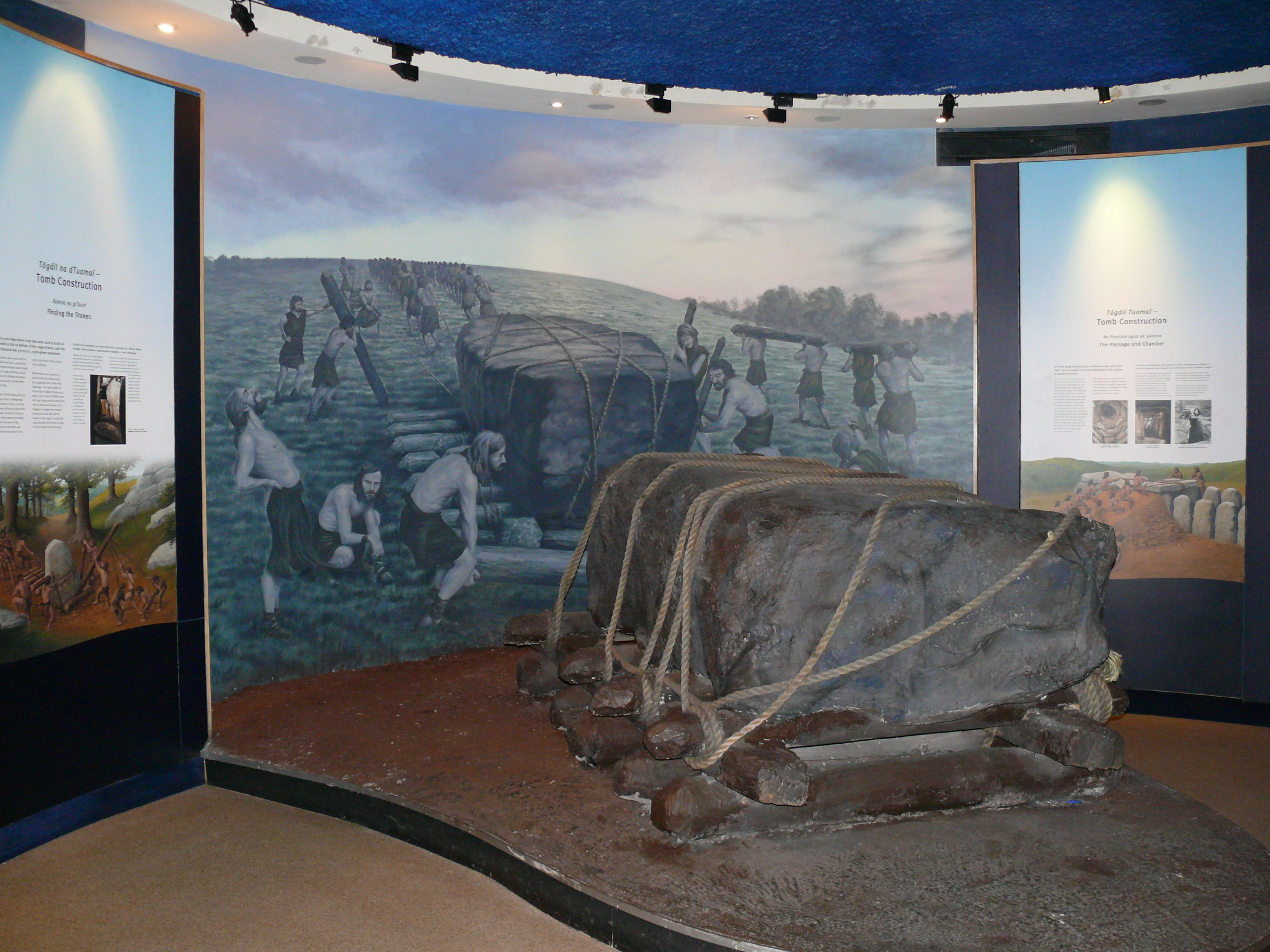

All access to Newgrange and Knowth is by guided tour only, with tours beginning at the Brú na Bóinne Visitor Centre, which was opened in June 1997 in Donore, County Meath. The visitor centre is located on the south side of the River Boyne, and the historical site is located on the north side of the river and is accessed via a shuttle bus accompanied by a tour guide.

The visitor centre is open all year round, with longer opening hours in the summertime. It houses a large interactive exhibition on the Brú na Bóinne area, an audio-visual presentation, and a wheelchair-accessible replica of the interior of the passage and chamber at Newgrange. It also has a tourist office, gift shop and tea rooms. There is a large car park and a picnic area at the centre. A bus service runs from Drogheda to the visitor centre via Donore village. The bus service varies depending on the season.

Dr. Michael Ryan, archaeologist and museum curator, wrote of the then-upcoming visitor centre in the journal Museum Ireland in 1995:

The Office of Public Works (OPW) has always been concerned for the future of the monuments and their programme includes an interpretative centre on the south bank of the Boyne with a new bridge over the river, discouragement of traffic in the archaeological area itself and access related to the planned new north south trunk road which will pass nearby. The centre has proved controversial with a strong lobby demanding its location in the village of Slane but it has now been approved and work to complete it is under way.

== Public transport access ==
Bus Éireann route 163 operates between Drogheda and the Brú na Bóinne Visitor Centre via Donore. The nearest railway station is Drogheda railway station approximately 9 kilometres distant.

== Brú na Bóinne National Park ==
The site will form the basis of a national park. In September 2023 the state bought Dowth Hall and 552 acres of surrounding land.

== See also ==
- List of archaeoastronomical sites by country
