= Newgrange cursus =

Neolithic ceremonial route typically found in Ireland and Great Britain

- Sruth na Gráinsí Nua
- Location within Ireland
- 53.695135°N 6.473093°W
- Type: cursus
- Location: valley of the River Boyne
- Region: County Meath, Ireland
- Part of: Brú na Bóinne

Site notes
- Length: 100 m (330 ft)
- Width: 20 m (66 ft)

UNESCO World Heritage Site
- Type: Cultural
- Criteria: i, iii, iv
- Designated: 1993 (17th session)
- Part of: Brú na Bóinne - Archaeological Ensemble of the Bend of the Boyne
- Reference no.: 659
- Ireland
- Region: Europe and North America

The Newgrange cursus is a Neolithic monument used as a ceremonial procession route within the Brú na Bóinne complex. The ancient trackway is 100m long and 20m wide. It is located at Newgrange, in County Meath, Ireland.

== Description ==
A cursus is a ritual procession route, and is typically found within a large Neolithic complex. It is characterized by having a long and narrow track bordered by parallel embankments and ditches. The only gaps in the track are the pathway's entrances and exits. The terminal point of a cursus is an area that is either square or rounded in shape.

The Newgrange cursus can be found approximately 100m east of the great passage tomb at Newgrange, in County Meath, Ireland. The ancient route lies on a north-south axis, and is made up of two parallel banks 20m apart. It probably originated from an area that once was a pond, now dried-up, and advances east-west, sloping upwards, to the north of the Newgrange ridge. The southern end of the track is closed off by a U-shaped terminal. Approximately 100 m of the prehistoric track exists today.

== History ==
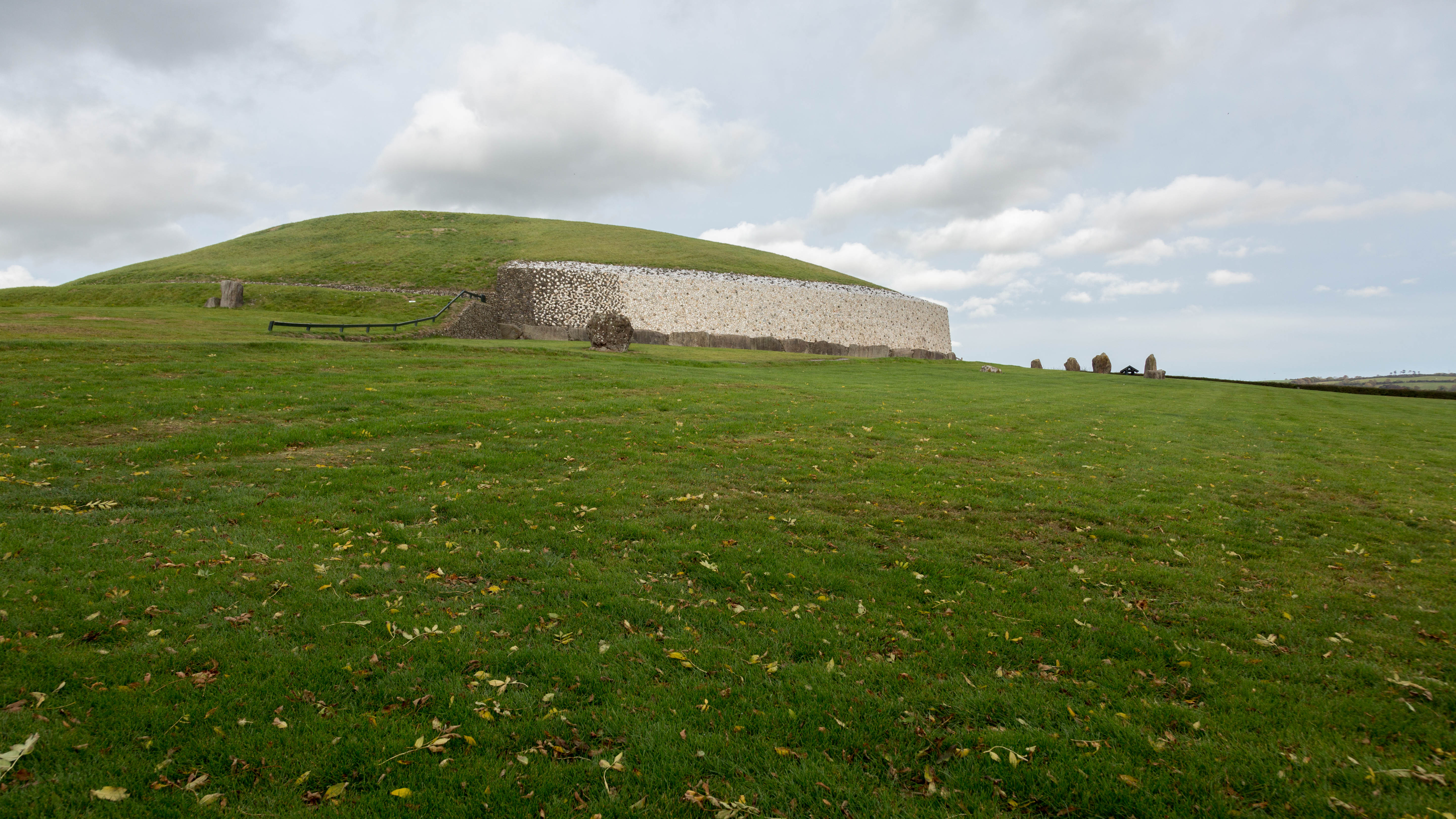
Newgrange Monument

Antiquarian, William Stukeley (1687-1765), created the term, "cursus" in the eighteenth century to describe the long earthwork track at Stonehenge, the prehistoric monument in Wiltshire, England. He initially believed that the route was originally used as a Roman racecourse. The word "cursus" is Latin for "course". Today, the word, "cursus" is used to describe long and narrow trackways or rectangular enclosures that are identified as ancient processional monuments. There are several cursus monuments found in Ireland and Britain. They vary in form, shape, size, and boundary. In Scotland, approximately half of the known cursus monuments have pit or post-hole boundaries. In County Meath, Ireland, the cursus associated with the passage tomb at Loughcrew is bounded by internal ditches and outer banks.
