= Knowth =

Irish Neolithic site

- Cnóbha (Irish)
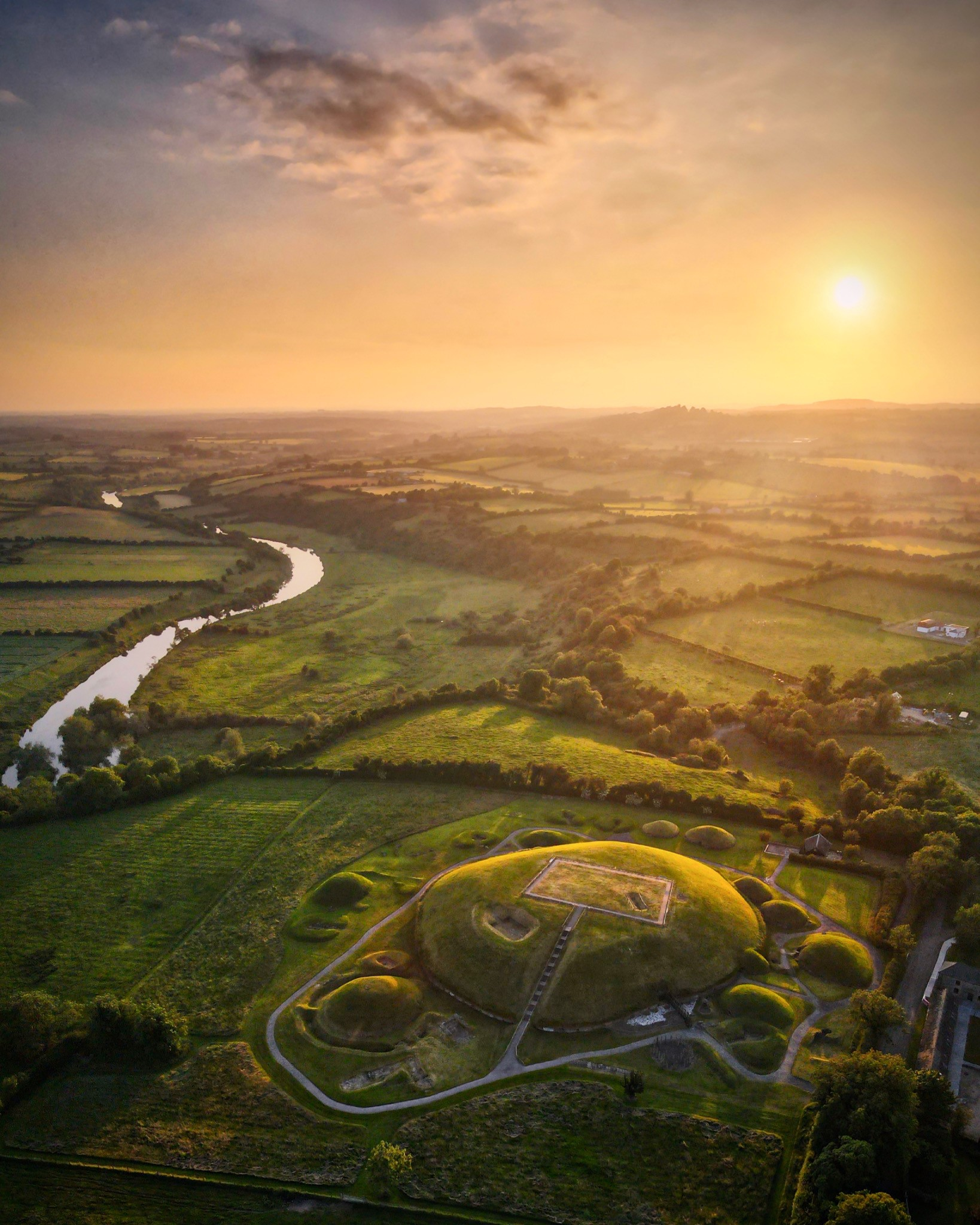
- The tomb in 2021

- Location within Ireland
- 53.701°N 6.4916°W
- Type: passage grave
- Periods: Neolithic
- Location: County Meath, Ireland
- Part of: Brú na Bóinne

History
- Built: c. 3200 BC

Site notes
- Height: 12 m (39 ft)
- Width: 67 m (220 ft)

UNESCO World Heritage Site
- Type: Cultural
- Criteria: i, iii, iv
- Designated: 1993 (17th session)
- Part of: Brú na Bóinne – Archaeological Ensemble of the Bend of the Boyne
- Reference no.: 659

National monument of Ireland
- Official name: Knowth Passage Tomb & Knowth Mound
- Reference no.: 409 & 549

Knowth (/ˈnaʊθ/; Irish: Cnóbha) is a prehistoric tomb overlooking the River Boyne in County Meath, Ireland. It comprises a large passage tomb surrounded by 17 smaller tombs, built during the Neolithic era around 3200 BC. It contains the largest assemblage of megalithic art in Europe. Knowth is part of the Brú na Bóinne complex, a World Heritage Site that also includes the similar passage tombs of Newgrange and Dowth.

After its initial period of use, Knowth gradually became a ruin, although the area continued to be a site of ritual activity in the Bronze Age. During the early Middle Ages, a royal residence was built on top of the great mound, which became the seat of the Kings of Knowth or Northern Brega. Archaeologist George Eogan led an extensive investigation of the site from the 1960s to 1980s, and parts of the monument were reconstructed.

== Description ==
The large mound has been estimated to date from c. 3200 BC. The mound is about 12 metres (40 ft) high and 67 metres (220 ft) in diameter, covering roughly a hectare. It contains two passages placed along an east–west line and is encircled by 127 kerbstones, of which three are missing, and four badly damaged. The passages are independent of each other, leading to separate burial chambers. The eastern passage arrives at a cruciform chamber, not unlike that found at Newgrange, which contains three recesses and basin stones into which the cremated remains of the dead were placed. The right-hand recess is larger and more elaborately decorated with megalithic art than the others, which is typical for Irish passage graves of this type. The western passage ends in an undifferentiated chamber, which is separated from the passage by a sill stone. The chamber seems to have also contained a basin stone which was later removed and is now located about two-thirds down the passageway.

=== Megalithic art ===
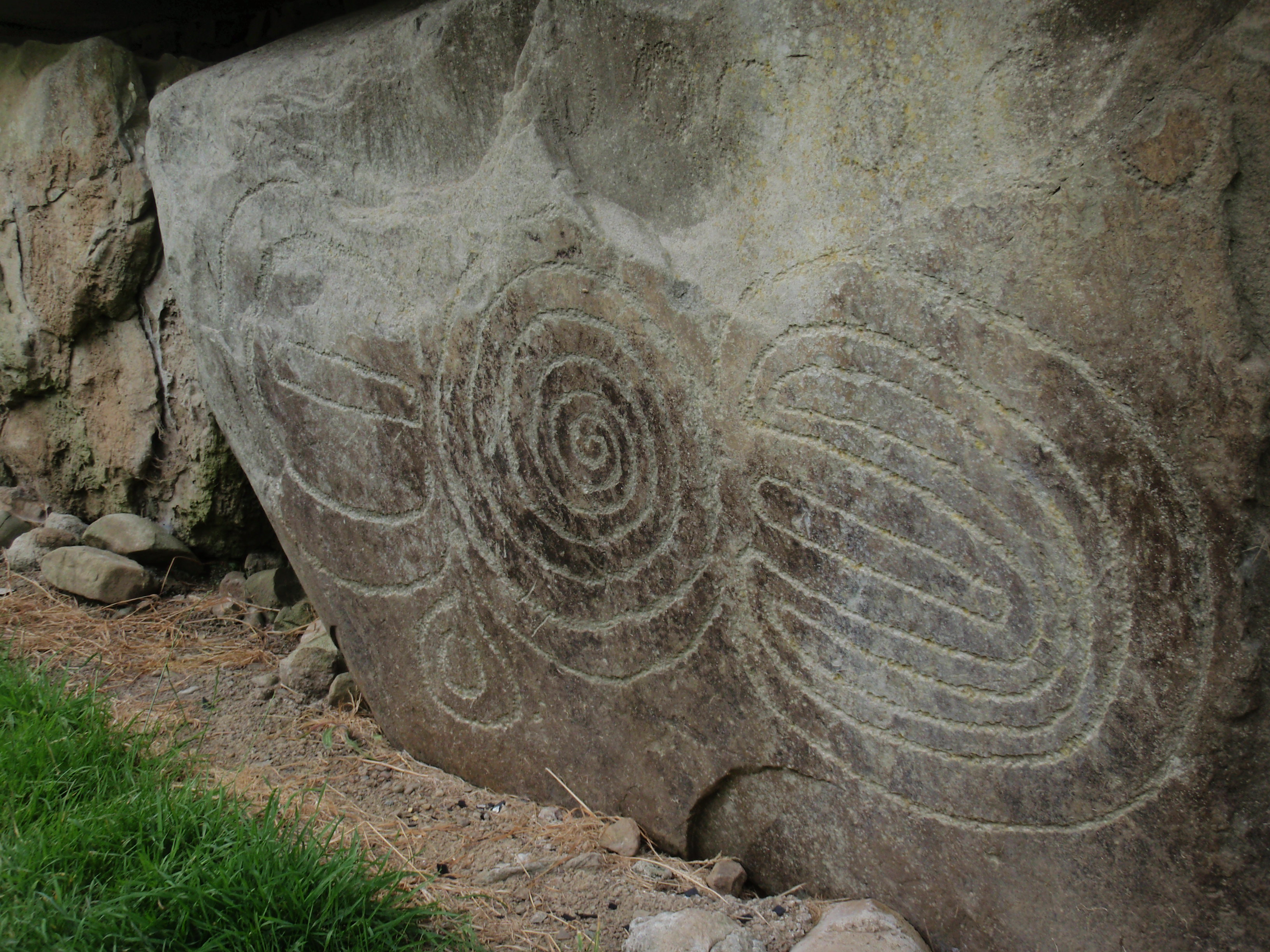
Megalithic art

Knowth contains more than a third of the total number of examples of megalithic art in all of Western Europe; over 200 decorated stones were found during excavations. Much of the artwork is of an abstract style and is found on the kerbstones, particularly approaching the entrances to the passages.

Many of the motifs are typical: spirals, lozenges and serpentiform. However, the megalithic art at Knowth contains a wide variety of images, such as crescent shapes, and the oldest known illustration of the moon in history. Much of this artwork was carved on the backs of the stones; a type of megalithic art known as hidden art. This suggests all manner of theories as regards the function of megalithic art within the Neolithic community who built the monuments in the Boyne valley. It is possible that they intended the art to be hidden. It is also possible that they simply recycled the stones and reused the other side.

=== Astronomical alignments ===
The east–west orientation of the passages at Knowth suggests astronomical alignment with the equinoxes. The alignment at Knowth does not occur today. This is due to a number of factors. First of all, the passages were discovered by later settlers and were, to some extent, destroyed or incorporated into souterrains. In this way, the original entrances to the passages were distorted or destroyed, making it difficult to establish if an alignment ever existed. Further, excavations since 1962 under George Eogan resulted in the erection of a concrete slab wall inside the mound's west entrance, restricting any investigation into the possible alignments. It seems likely that the passages were intended to align. Also, the alignments of ancient monuments can change due to Milankovitch cycles. The most extensive research on alignments and astronomy at Knowth was carried out by American-Irish researcher Martin Brennan.

== History ==
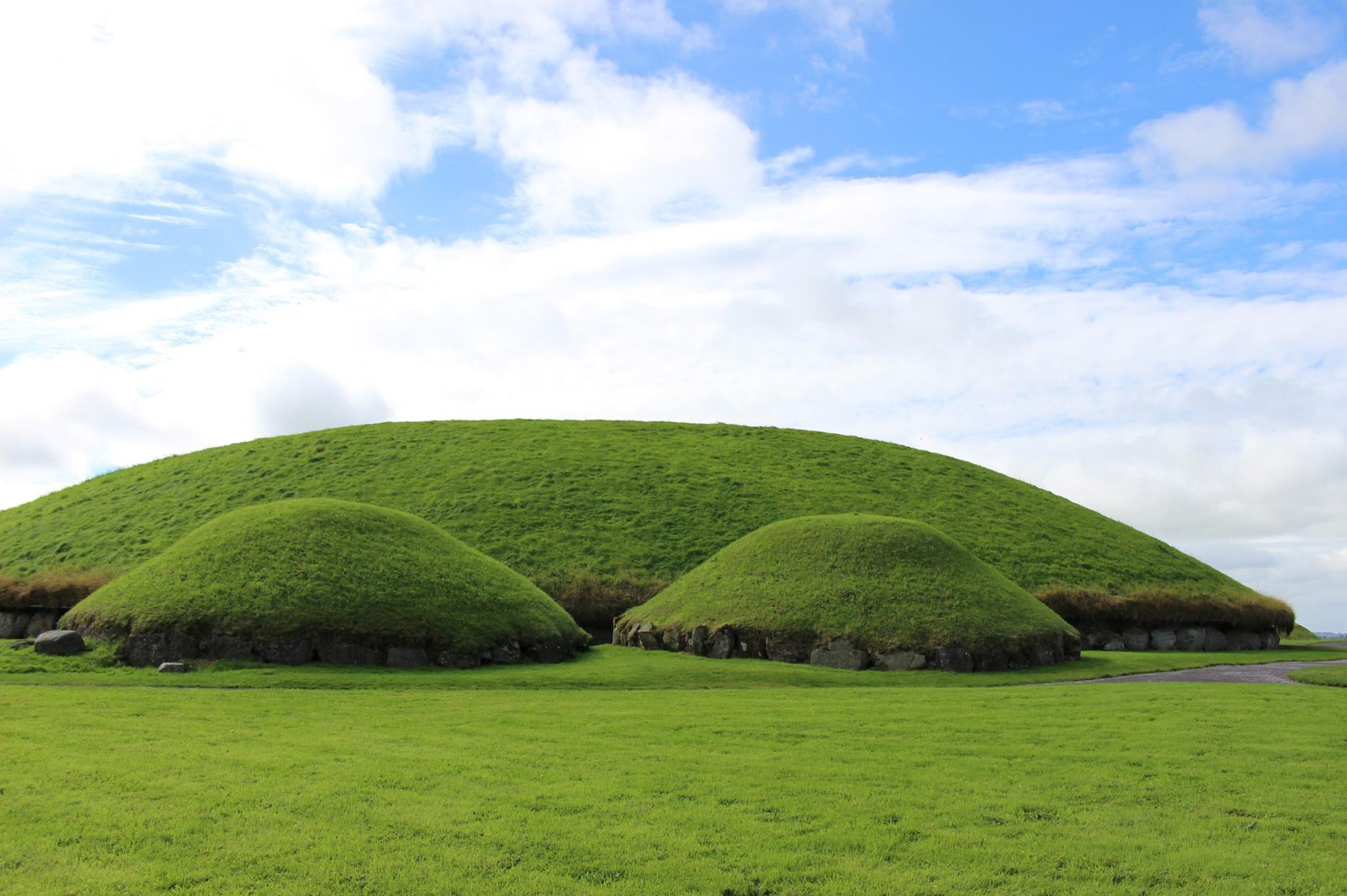
Knowth: the main mound and two satellite tombs

There is some evidence for late Neolithic and Bronze Age activity on the site. Most of this stems from the existence of a grooved ware timber circle located near the entrance to the eastern passage. Archeological evidence suggests that this was used as a ritual or sacred area after the great mound at Knowth had already fallen into disuse. Evidence for ritual consists of a large number of votive offerings found in and around the immediate areas of the timbers that formed the circle. 4r[2 The hill at Knowth fell into disrepair, and the mound or cairn slipped, causing the entrances to both passages to be covered. The site remained practically unused for a period of two thousand years. The site was briefly used as a burial site; some 35 cist graves were found on the site during excavations.

In the late Iron Age and early Christian period, it became a hill fort with encircling ditches and souterrains added. Knowth became a habitational site for the first time. Two ditches were dug, one at the base of the mound behind the kerbstones, and the other at the top. At this stage, the entrances to both passages seem to have been discovered. Evidence includes early Christian graffiti on the stones in the eastern chamber, and four names were carved in ogham. It seems it was at this stage that the basin stone from the western chamber was moved in an attempt to remove it and was abandoned in the passage because it got stuck. Knowth became a significant political site and the capital of the Kingdom of Northern Brega.

Knowth was called Cnogba in Old Irish, whose meaning is unclear. This later became Cnoghbha, and finally Cnóbha in modern Irish. In the medieval Triads of Ireland, Úam Chnogba ('caves of Knowth'), Úam Slángæ (probably Rathcoran) and Dearc Fearna (probably Dunmore Cave) are listed as "the three darkest places in Ireland".

After a brief military interlude following the Norman invasion of Ireland, when the Normans used Knowth as a motte in the 12th century, the site came into the possession of the Cistercian monks of Mellifont Abbey. It seems that the mound was then again used as a grange or farm. Stone walls were built over the mound, and stone buildings within the walls. After the dissolution of the monasteries, the site was used mainly for agriculture until most of the site was taken over by the state in 1939.

== Archaeological investigation and restoration ==
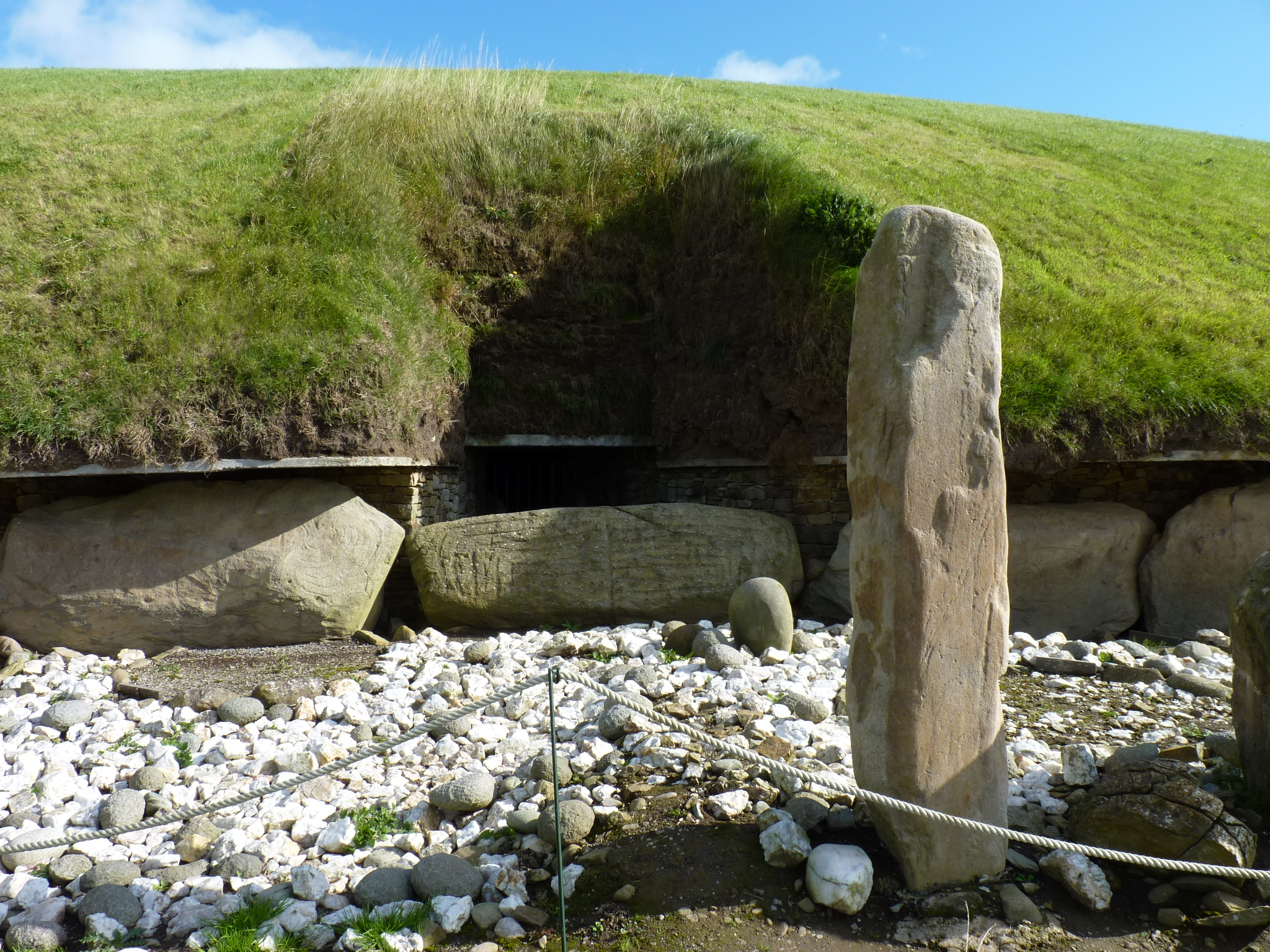
The western entrance, showing the white quartz left on the ground

A brief excavation of the site was carried out in 1941 by Macallister. However, the first thorough archaeological investigation and excavations of Knowth began in 1962 and were led by George Eogan of University College Dublin. When his excavations began, very little was known about the full extent of the site. The entrances to the western and eastern passages were discovered in 1967 and 1968 respectively, and, slowly, the layers of activity at the site of Knowth were uncovered. The excavation has produced numerous books and reports on the findings. Following the excavation, conservation, restoration and reconstruction works took place.

A layer of white quartz stones was found at the entrances to the great mound. The same was found at the entrance to Newgrange, and the archaeologists there concluded that it had made up a white façade or revetment on the front of the monument that had fallen. This white quartz front was reconstructed at Newgrange. However, George Eogan did not believe Neolithic people could have built such a revetment without it collapsing. He suggested that most or all of the white quartz had been spread on the ground, and so it was left on the ground at Knowth. While some archaeologists have supported this decision, other archaeologists argue that both Knowth and Newgrange had white quartz façades, such as Robert Hensey and Elizabeth Shee Twohig in their paper "Facing the cairn at Newgrange" (2017). They note that the quartz layers at both sites were thickest nearest the kerbstones, suggesting it had slid down the mound rather than being laid flat. They also contend that if the builders quarried and brought the quartz a long distance, they likely would have used it to "maximum effect" as a striking façade, rather than laying it on the ground where it could not be seen as well. Along with archaeologist Carleton Jones, Hensey and Twohig note that passage tombs in Brittany have similar near-vertical dry stone fronts, such as Gavrinis and Barnenez.

== Access ==
The site is 9 km west of Drogheda. Access is by guided tour only. Tours begin at the Brú na Bóinne Visitor Centre in Donore. Visitors can look down the eastern passage and visit the nearby modern interpretive room.

== Gallery ==
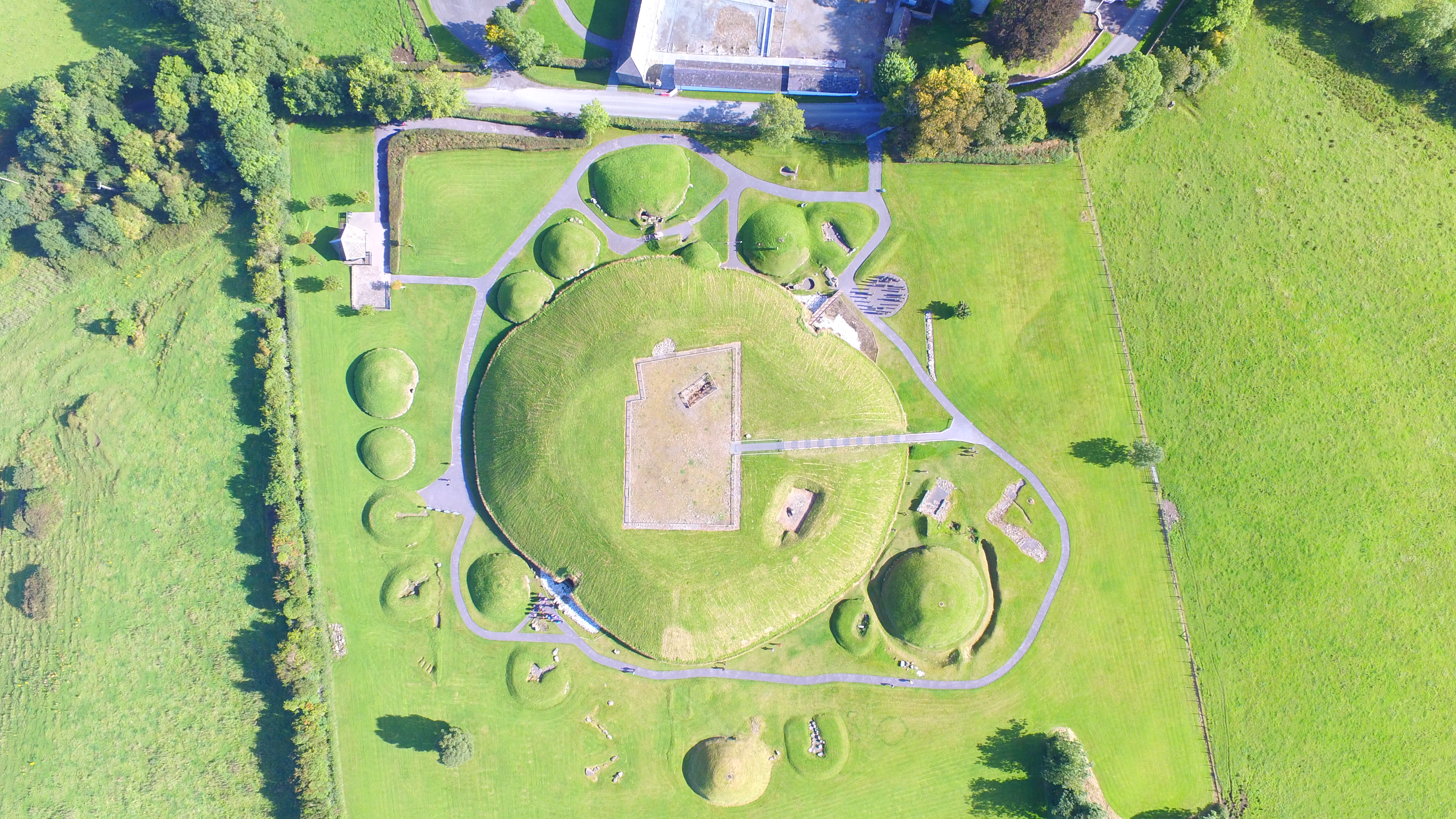
Overhead view

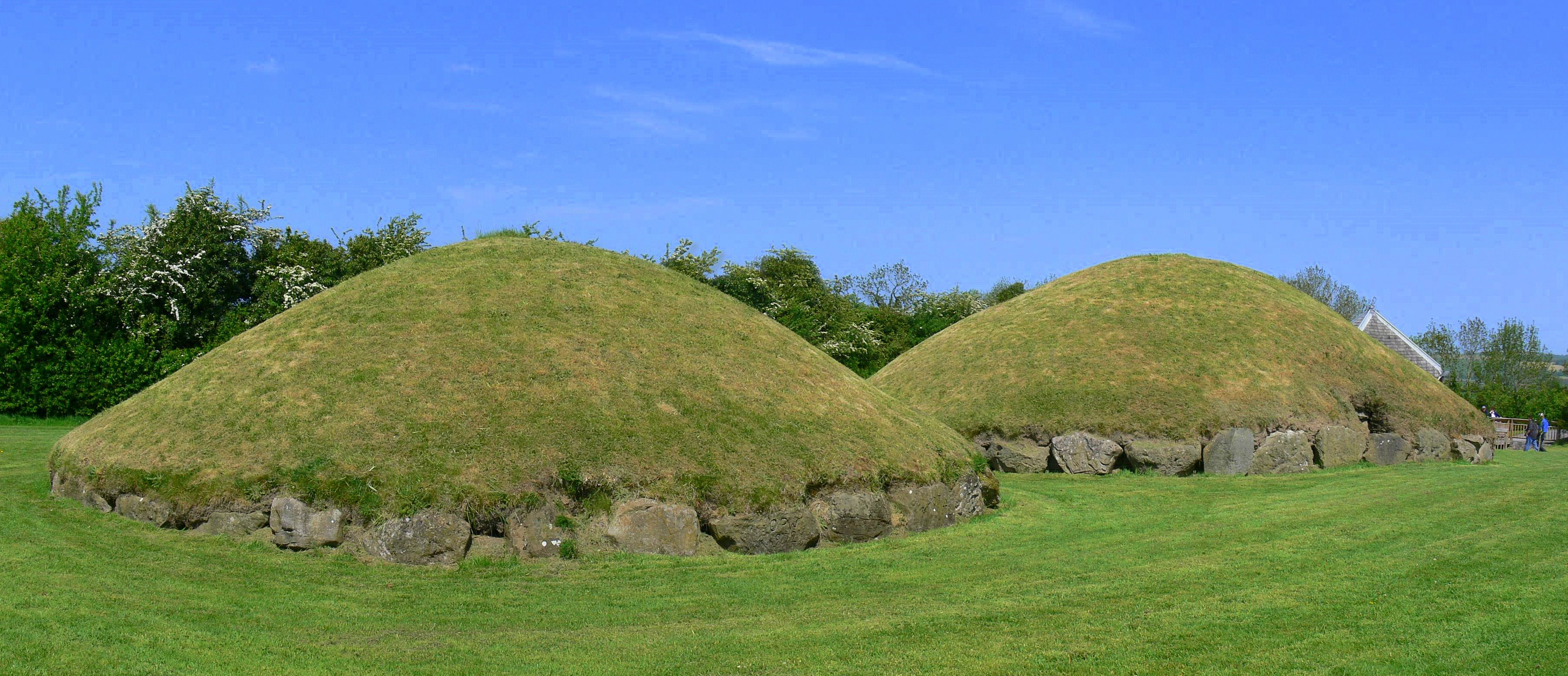
Knowth tombs

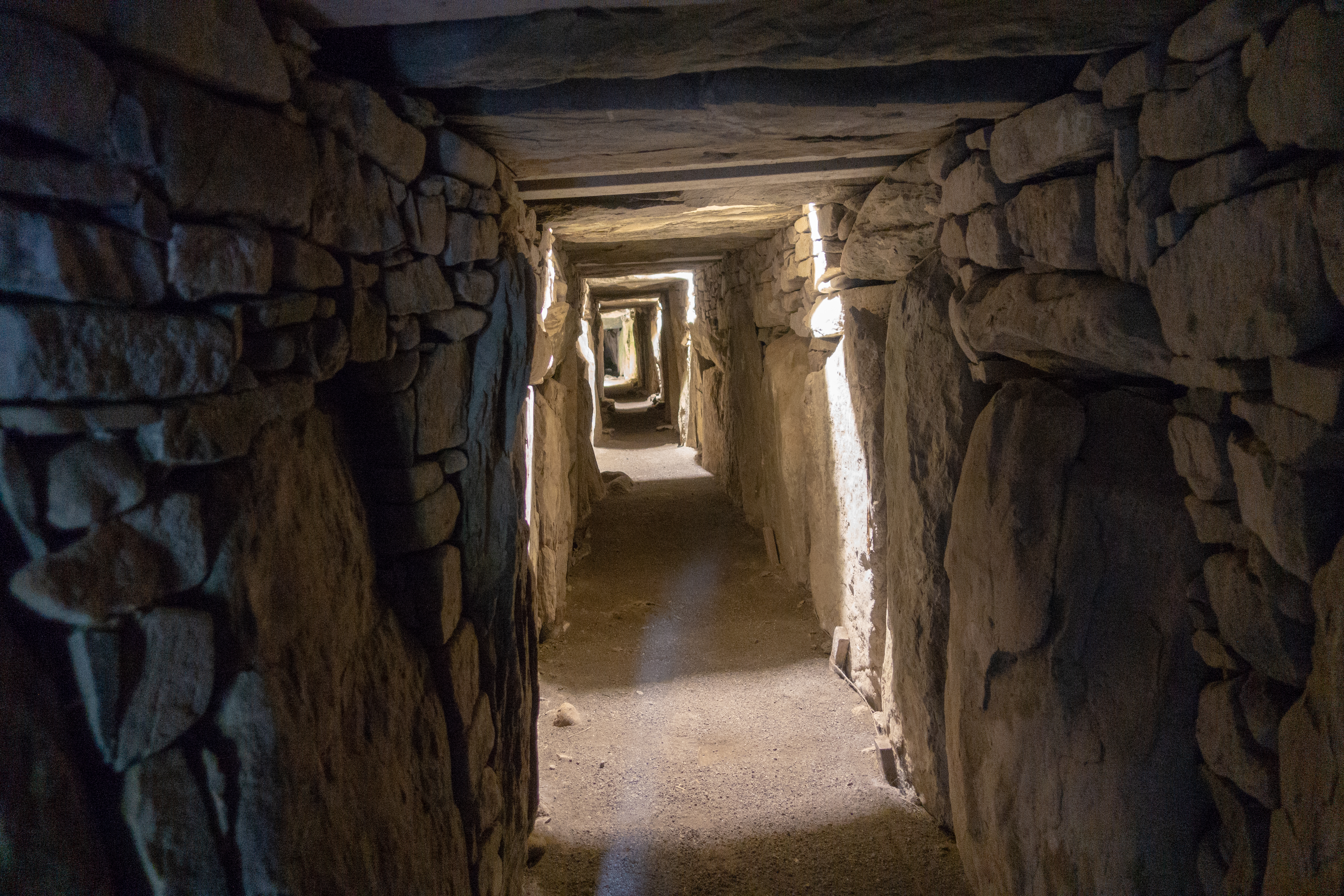
Inside the passageway

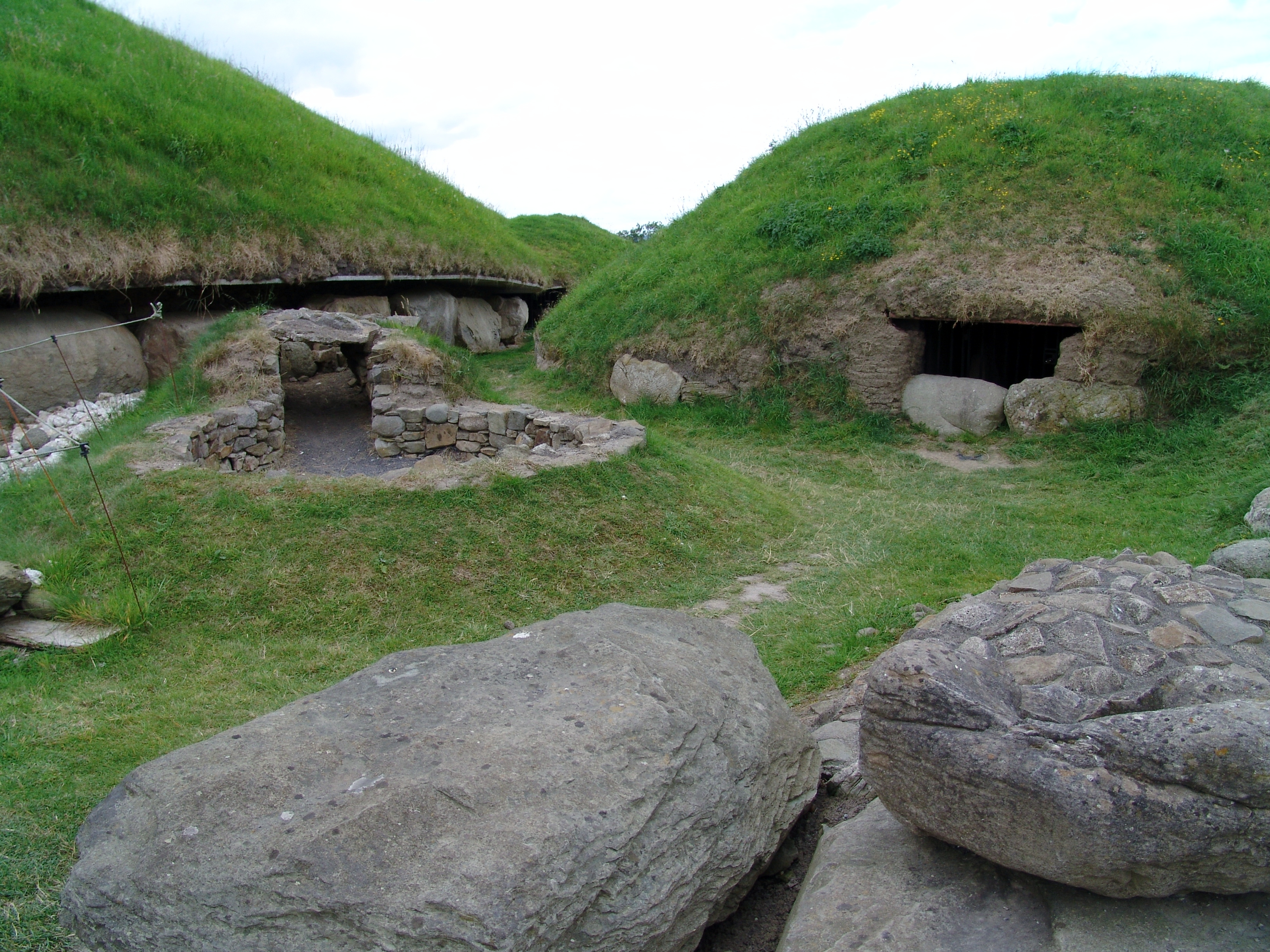
Knowth tombs

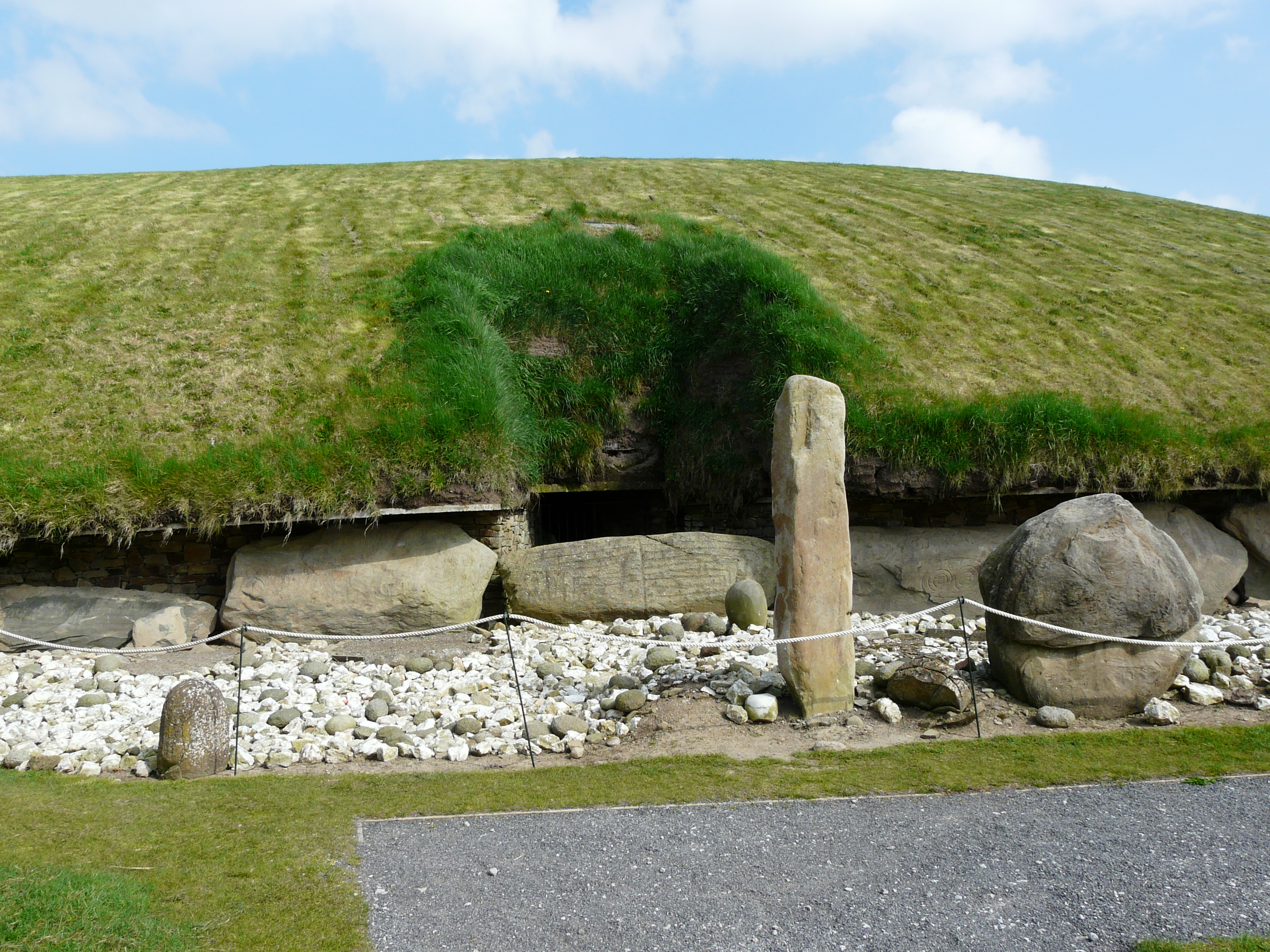
entrance to second passage

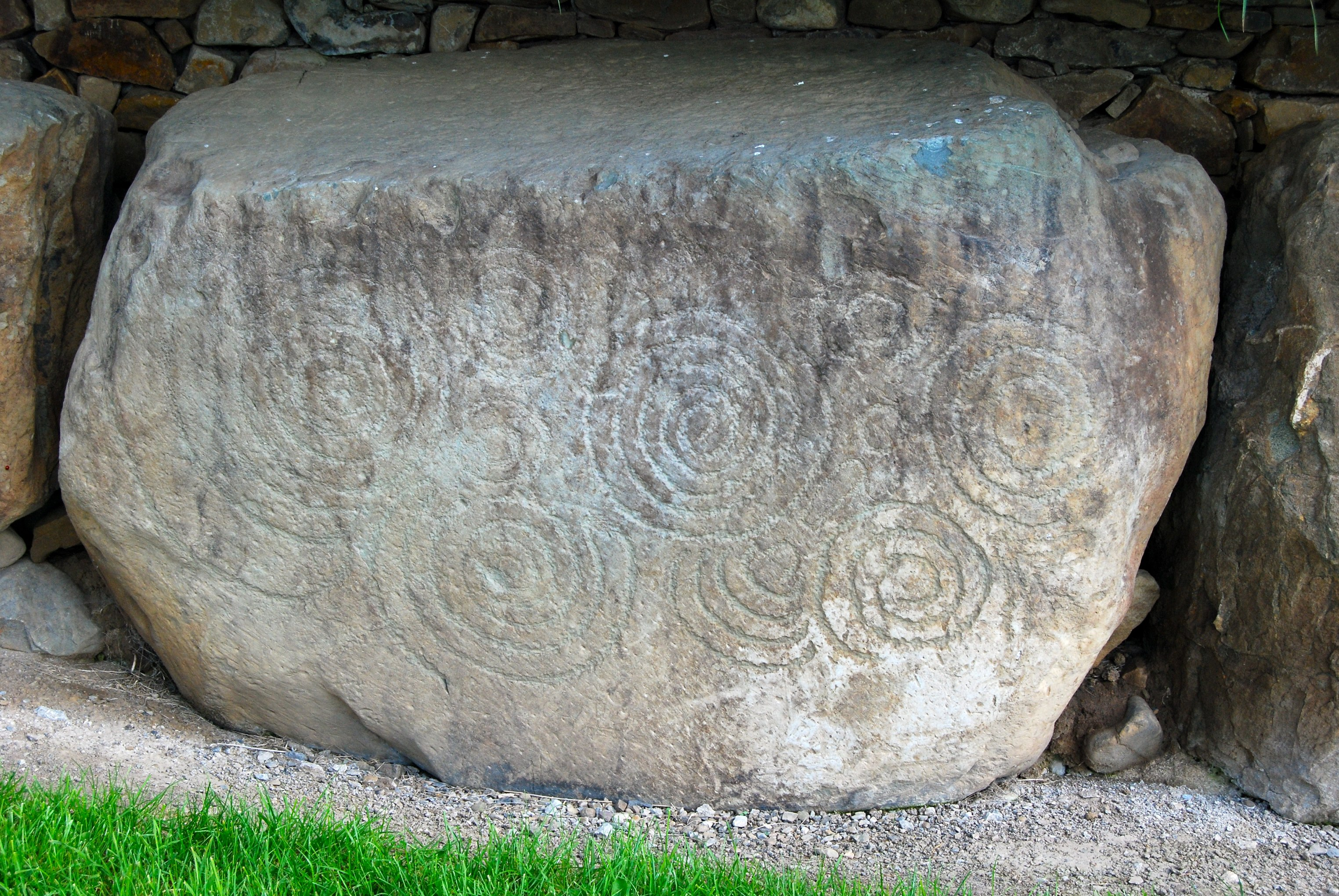
Spiral art on kerbstone

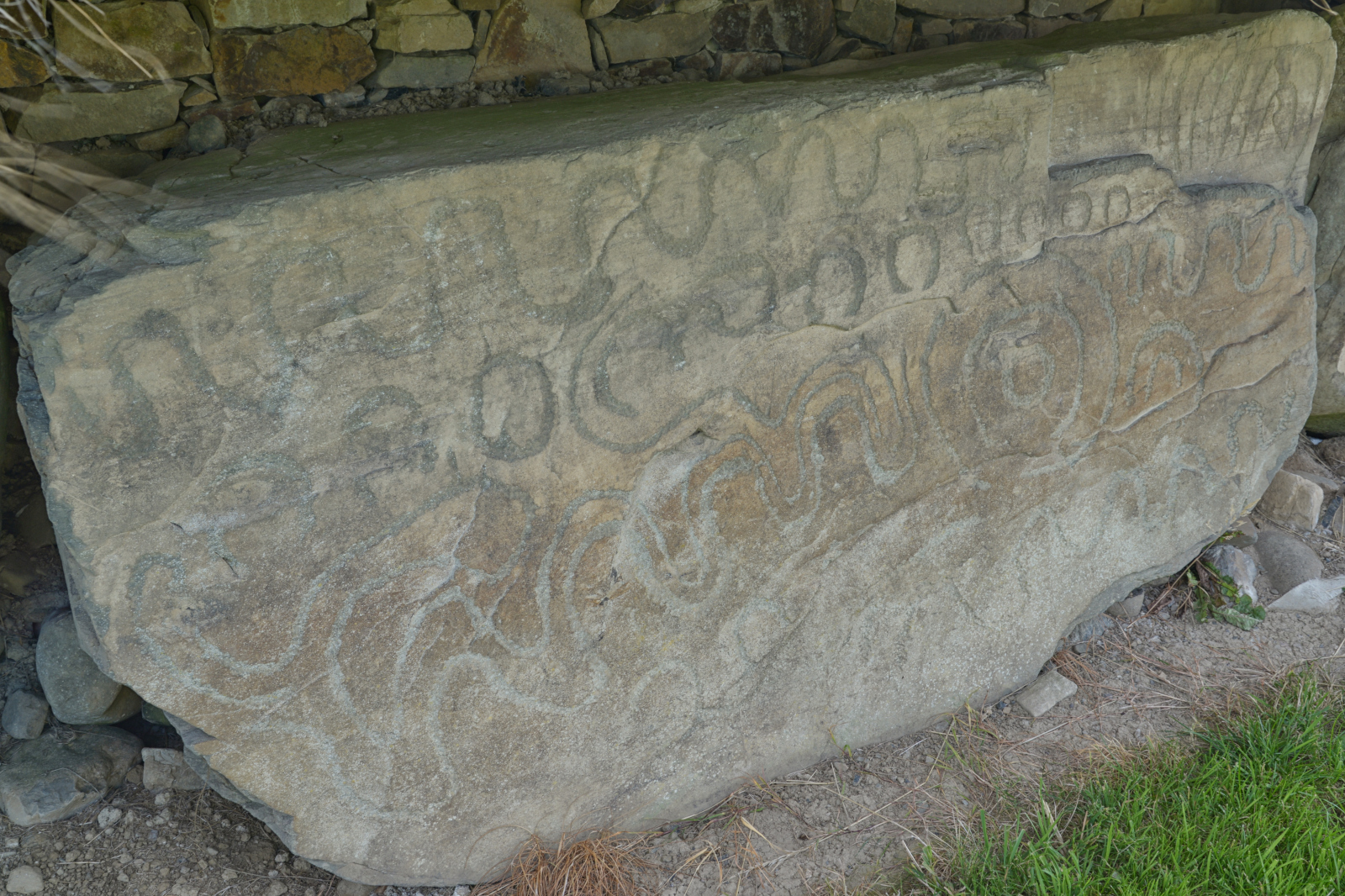
Serpentiform and circular art on kerbstone

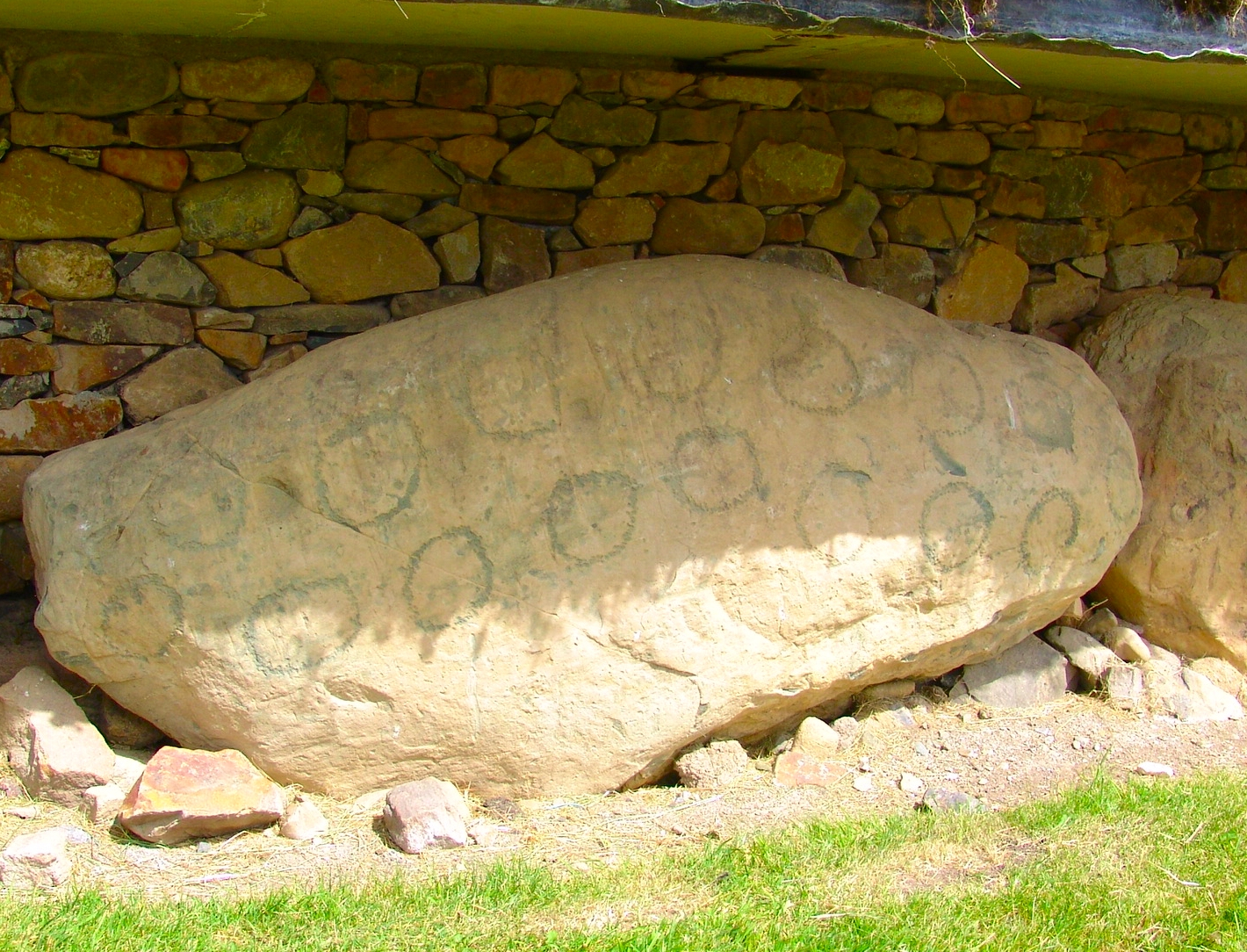
Circular art on kerbstone

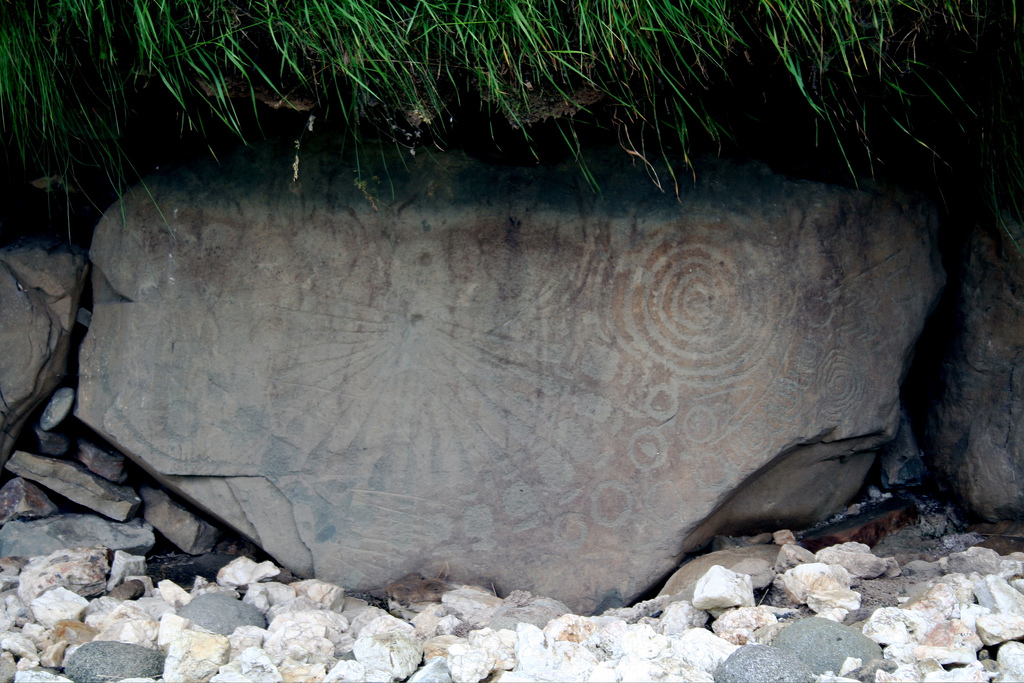
Possible lunar calendar on kerbstone

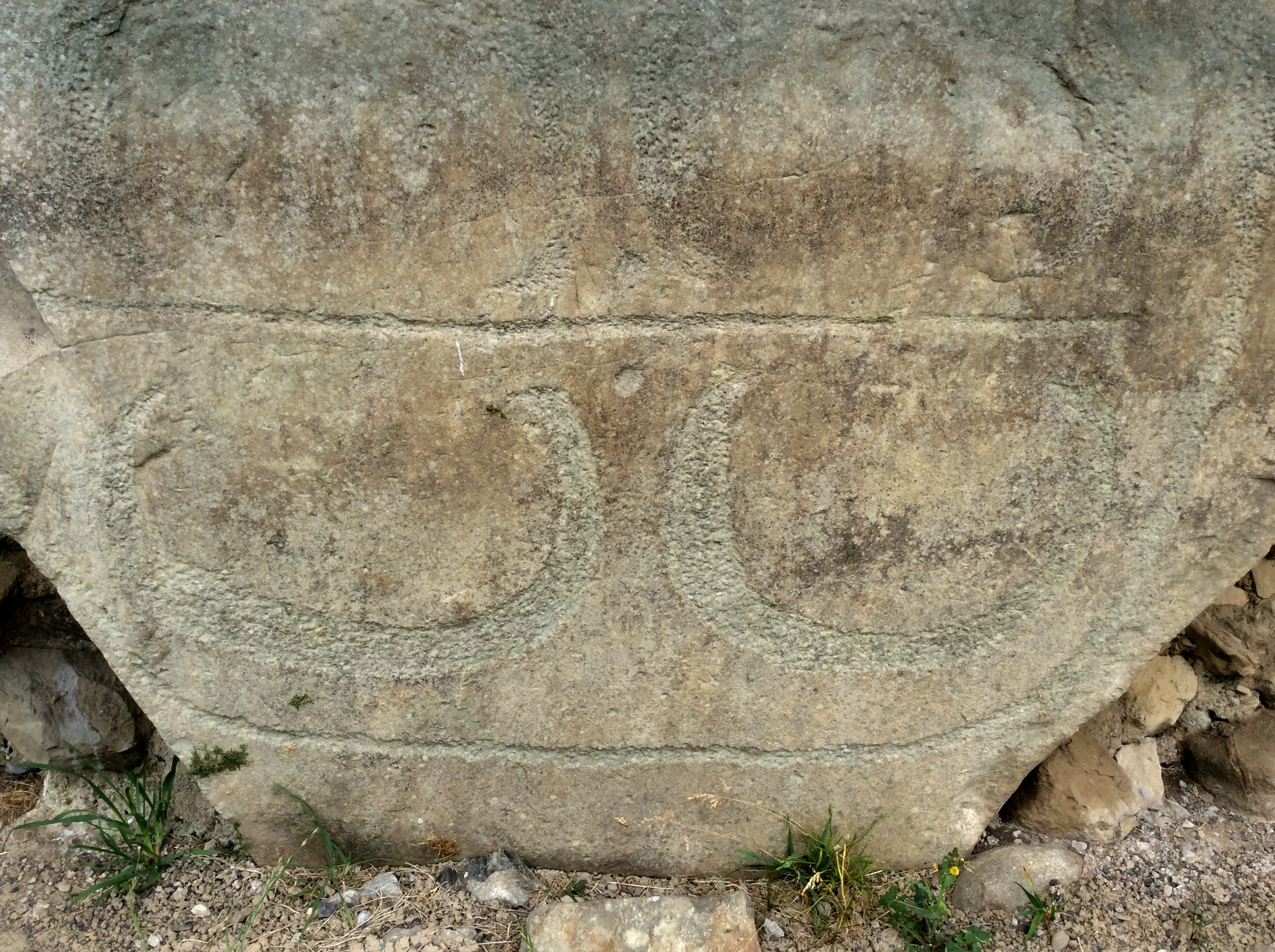
Crescent shaped art on kerbstone

== Sources ==
- Byrne, Francis John, Irish Kings and High-Kings. Batsford, London, 1973. ISBN 0-7134-5882-8.
- Mac Shamhráin, Ailbhe, "Church and dynasty in Early Christian Brega: Lusk, Inis Pátraic and the cast of Máel-Finnia, king and saint", Table 8.1, Lineages of Síl nÁedo Sláine, p. 127; in The Island of St Patrick: Church and ruling dynasties in Fingal and Meath, 400–1148, (ed.) Mac Shamhráin, Four Courts, 2004.
