= George Eogan =

Irish archaeologist (1930–2021)

- Born: 14 September 1930; Nobber, County Meath, Ireland
- Died: 18 November 2021 (aged 91)
- Known for: The archaeology of Neolithic and Bronze Age Ireland
- Spouse: Fiona Stephens
- Children: 4

Academic background
- Education: University College Dublin; Trinity College Dublin
- Thesis: The Bronze Sword in Ireland (1961)
- Doctoral advisor: Frank Mitchell

Academic work
- Discipline: Archaeologist
- Notable works

Senator
- In office 23 April 1987 – 1 November 1989
- Constituency: Nominated by the Taoiseach

Personal details
- Party: Independent

George Eogan, MRIA (14 September 1930 – 18 November 2021) was an Irish archaeologist.

He was born in Nobber, County Meath, and studied at University College Dublin (UCD) and then Trinity College Dublin. In 1965, he was appointed to a lectureship at UCD, becoming a professor in 1979, and also serving as head of department from then until 1995.

Eogan was particularly known for his work over forty years at Knowth, having been director of the Knowth Research Project. In 1968, he became the first person in over a millennium to enter the east-side tomb at the site.

Eogan was also appointed an independent member of Seanad Éireann, serving from 1987 until 1989.
