= David Mullin =

British archaeologist

Academic background
- Education: University of Bristol; University of Reading
- Thesis: A landscape of borders : the prehistory of the Anglo-Welsh borderland (2011)
- Doctoral advisor: Richard Bradley

Academic work
- Discipline: Archaeology
- Sub-discipline: Prehistoric archaeology
- Institutions: Oxford Archaeology; University of Worcester

David Mullin is British archaeologist specialising in the study of prehistory. He has worked at the University of Worcester, Oxford Archaeology, and the University of Oxford.

== Education ==
Mullin studied archaeology at the University of Bristol, where he completed a Bachelor of Arts degree in 2000 and a Master of Philosophy degree in 2001. He went on to conduct research at the University of Reading where he completed a Doctor of Philosophy in 2011.

== Career ==
Mullin worked as a volunteer on excavations at West Heslerton, North Yorkshire in 1987 and subsequently on excavations in Chester and Norton Priory during the late 1980s.

He attended the University of Bristol as a mature student and gained a first class degree there in 2000, going on to complete an MPhil at Bristol in 2001. During this time he worked for Bristol and Region Archaeological Services, excavating sites across the city. Subsequently, whilst working at Gloucestershire County Council, he undertook Phase 1 of the Severn Estuary Rapid Coastal Zone Survey; a study of The Aggregate Landscape of Gloucestershire and an analysis of Richard Atkinson's excavations at Frampton on Severn.

Mullin joined Oxford Archaeology in 2008 and worked in the post-excavation department. Whilst there he was trained by Ann Woodward in the analysis of prehistoric pottery and, as well as writing numerous specialist reports, completed work on the prehistoric material from Cirencester before Corinium and on a Roman settlement site at Hassocks, West Sussex.

After completing a PhD at the University of Reading, supervised by Professor Richard Bradley, Mullin became a lecturer in Heritage and Archaeology at the University of Worcester, working there from 2008 to 2019. During this time, Mullin organised a session at the 2008 Theoretical Archaeology Group conference; he edited a collection of papers on the theme of borders and wrote the introduction (which drew on his doctoral research) and the conclusion.

As part of his role at Worcester, he co-directed a series of excavations in northern Somerset, including at the Stanton Drew stone circles; the Priddy Circles; standing stones at Yarborough and a series of round barrows on the Mendip Hills. He also co-directed excavations at the Late Bronze Age metalwork hoard site at Broadward, Shropshire. He has also contributed to the North West England Archaeological Research Framework and to the South West Archaeological Research Framework. He wrote the chapter on the later Bronze Age for the Avebury part of the Research Framework for the Stonehenge, Avebury and Associated Sites World Heritage Site.

Mullin also worked at the Oxford University Department of Continuing Education, where he taught on the Undergraduate Certificate and Undergraduate Diploma in Archaeology for four years. He also acted as course coordinator for the Early Prehistory module of the Undergraduate Diploma and was Chair of the Exam Board for the Certificate courses.

In 2018 he was invited to give a paper on his research into the archaeology of borders and borderlands to the European Association of Archaeologists Annual Conference in Barcelona, Spain.

In 2012, Mullin published his PhD thesis as A Landscape of Borders: the prehistory of the Anglo-Welsh borderland by Archaeopress. A review by Keith Ray for the Prehistoric Society assessed that the book "makes an important point-in-time contribution to research into, and awareness of, some critical classes (and groups) of prehistoric material. The work on hoards ... and on temper sourcing in particular, will provide a springboard for future important research".

During 2020–21, he was employed as a Research Infrastructure Advisor by Historic England, where he helped to develop the Research Frameworks Network.

He is currently employed as an early prehistoric pottery specialist by Wessex Archaeology.

== Other writing ==
In addition to his archaeological work, Mullin has published creative non-fiction and poetry. He contributed a piece about the significance of the ash tree to the National Museum of Wales magazine Cynfas, had writing included in The Book of Water for Sheffield University's Route 57 Magazine and contributed to two pamphlets published by Nightbird Press. He is researching the life and influence of the painter Samuel Palmer and has had a poem about the artist published in Elsewhere: A Journal of Place. His poetry has also appeared in Apocalyptic Landscape: Poems from the Expressionist Poetry Workshop edited by Steve Ely (Valley Press) and in the journals Where Meadows, Seedlings, Channel Magazine and Black Box Manifold. His first poetry chapbook Unmoored was published by Red Ceilings Press in 2026. He was writer in residence at the Special Collections at the University of Bradford, was co-editor of the Journal of the Ted Hughes Society and organised Ferlinghetti Day UK 2025.

== Selected publications ==
Books

- Mullin, David (2003). The Bronze Age Landscape of the Northern English Midlands. BAR British Series. Vol. 351. Oxford: Archaeopress. doi:10.30861/9781841715117. ISBN 978-1-84171-511-7.
- Mullin, David, ed. (2011). Places in Between: The Archaeology of Social, Cultural and Geographical Borders and Borderlands. Oxford: Oxbow Books. ISBN 9781842179833.
- Mullin, David (2012). A Landscape of Borders: the prehistory of the Anglo-Welsh borderland. British Archaeological Reports British Series. Vol. 572. Oxford: Archaeopress. ISBN 978-1-4073-1057-2.
