= Barclodiad y Gawres =

Neolithic burial chamber in Anglesey, UK

Coordinates: 53.2073°N 4.5036°W

Location of Barclodiad y Gawres, on the headland north of Cable Bay, Anglesey

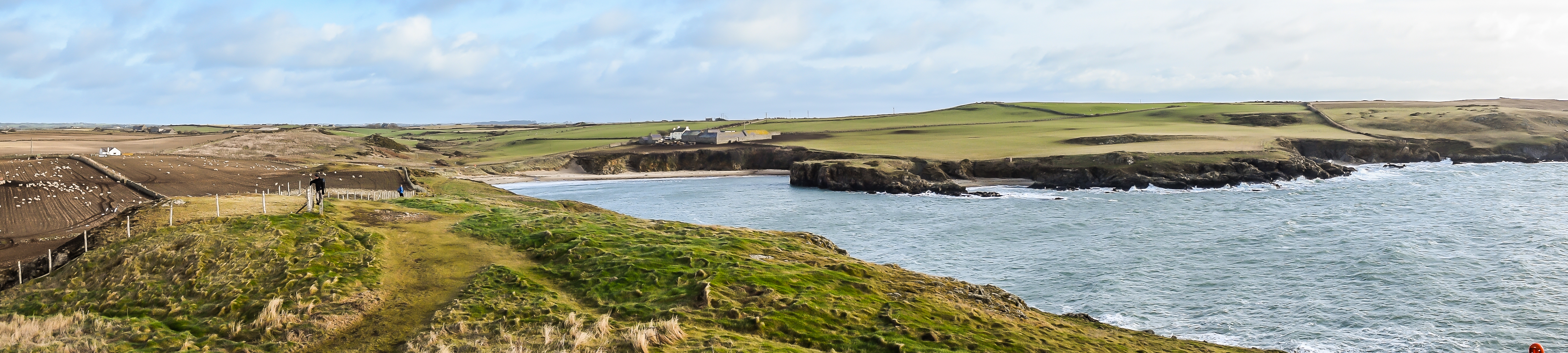
Panorama from above burial chamber in 2014

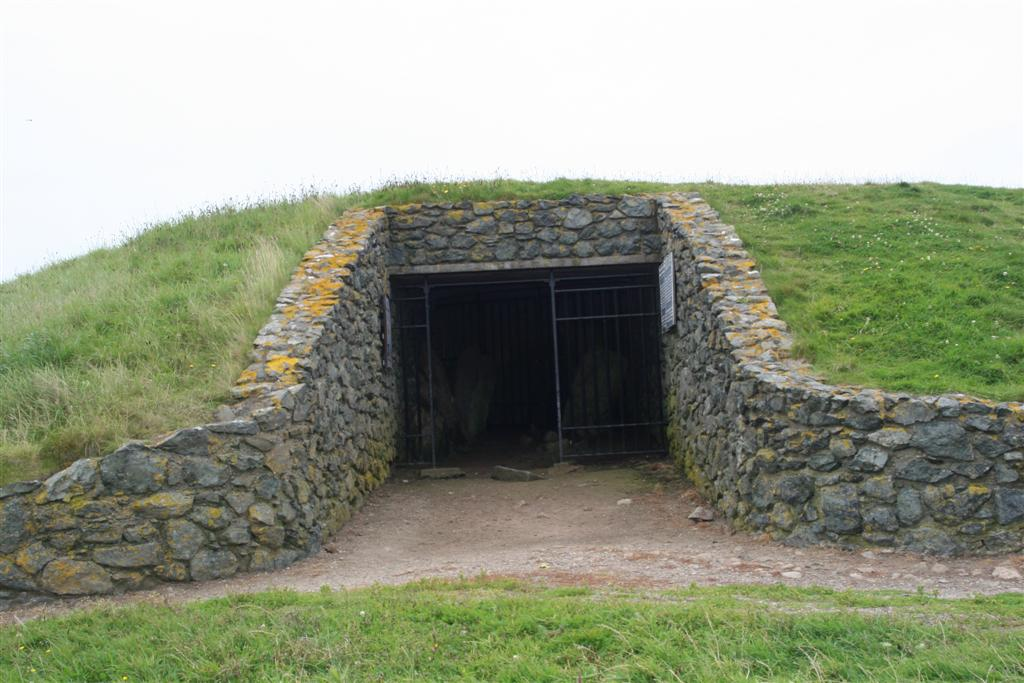
Burial chamber entrance

Barclodiad y Gawres (Welsh for 'The Giantess's Apronful'; Welsh pronunciation: [barkˌlɔdjad ə ˈgau̯rɛs]) is a Neolithic burial chamber between Rhosneigr and Aberffraw on the south-western coast of the island of Anglesey in North Wales. It is an example of a cruciform passage grave, a notable feature being its decorated stones. Similar graves and marks exist across the Irish Sea in the Boyne Valley.

== Excavations ==
Full excavations were performed in 1952–53, after which the chamber was re-roofed with concrete and covered with turf to resemble the original structure. During the excavations two cremated young male burials were found within the south-western side-chamber. The central area of the main chamber contained the remains of a fire on which had been poured a stew which had been made with wrasse, eel, frog, toad, grass snake, mouse, shrew and hare, then covered with limpet shells and pebbles.

During the excavations five stones with carvings—spirals, zig-zags, lozenges and chevrons—were discovered. A sixth stone with carvings was discovered in 2001.

== Location ==
More or less equidistant from Aberffraw and Rhosneigr, it is on the north side of Porth Trecastell, on the Anglesey Coastal Path, and a short walk from the A4080. It is cared for by the Welsh heritage organisation Cadw.

== Gallery ==
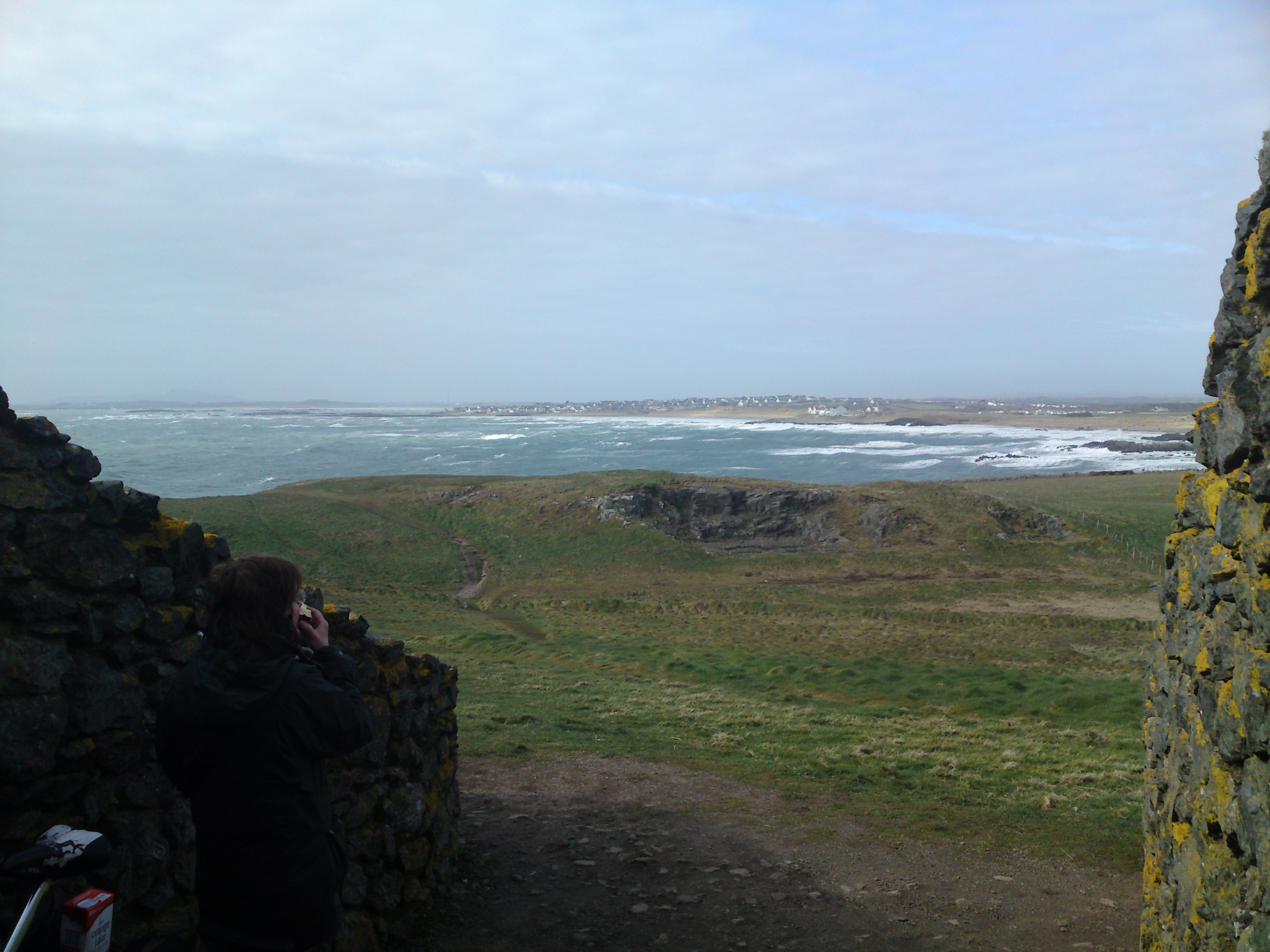
View from the entrance, surf in Cymyran Bay

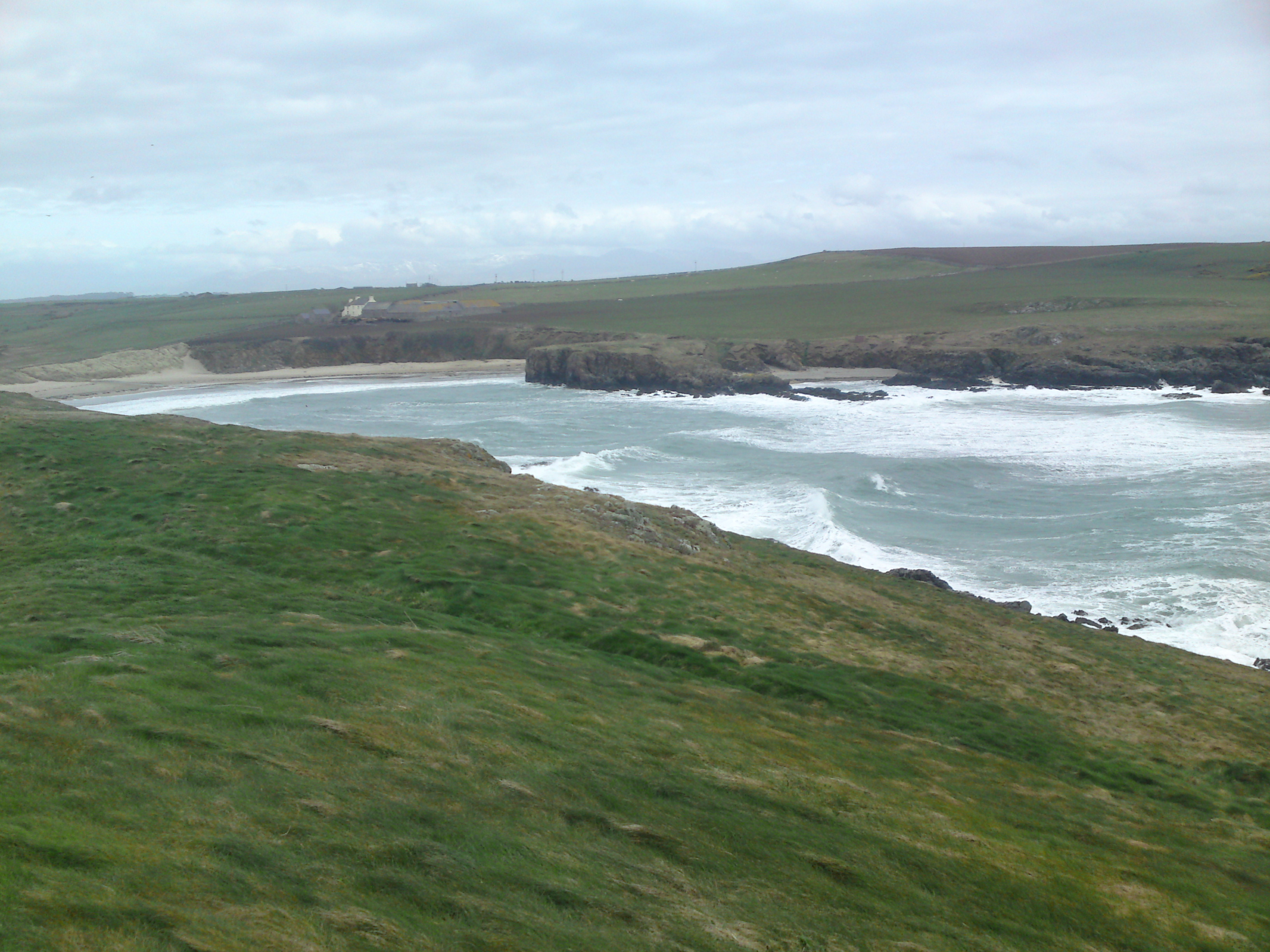
View eastwards over Porth Trecastell cove from the side of Barclodiad y Gawres

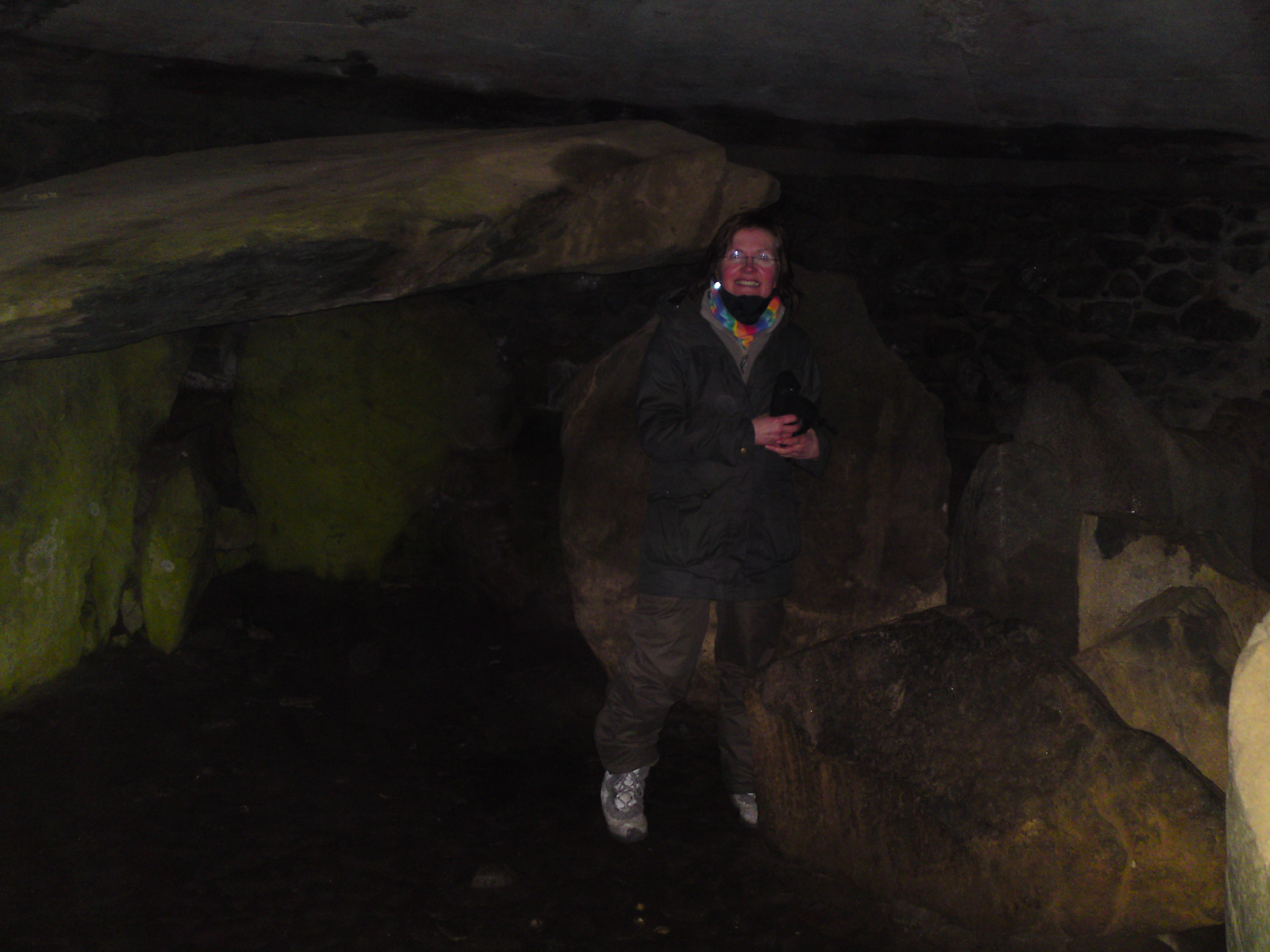
The chamber; small adult for scale

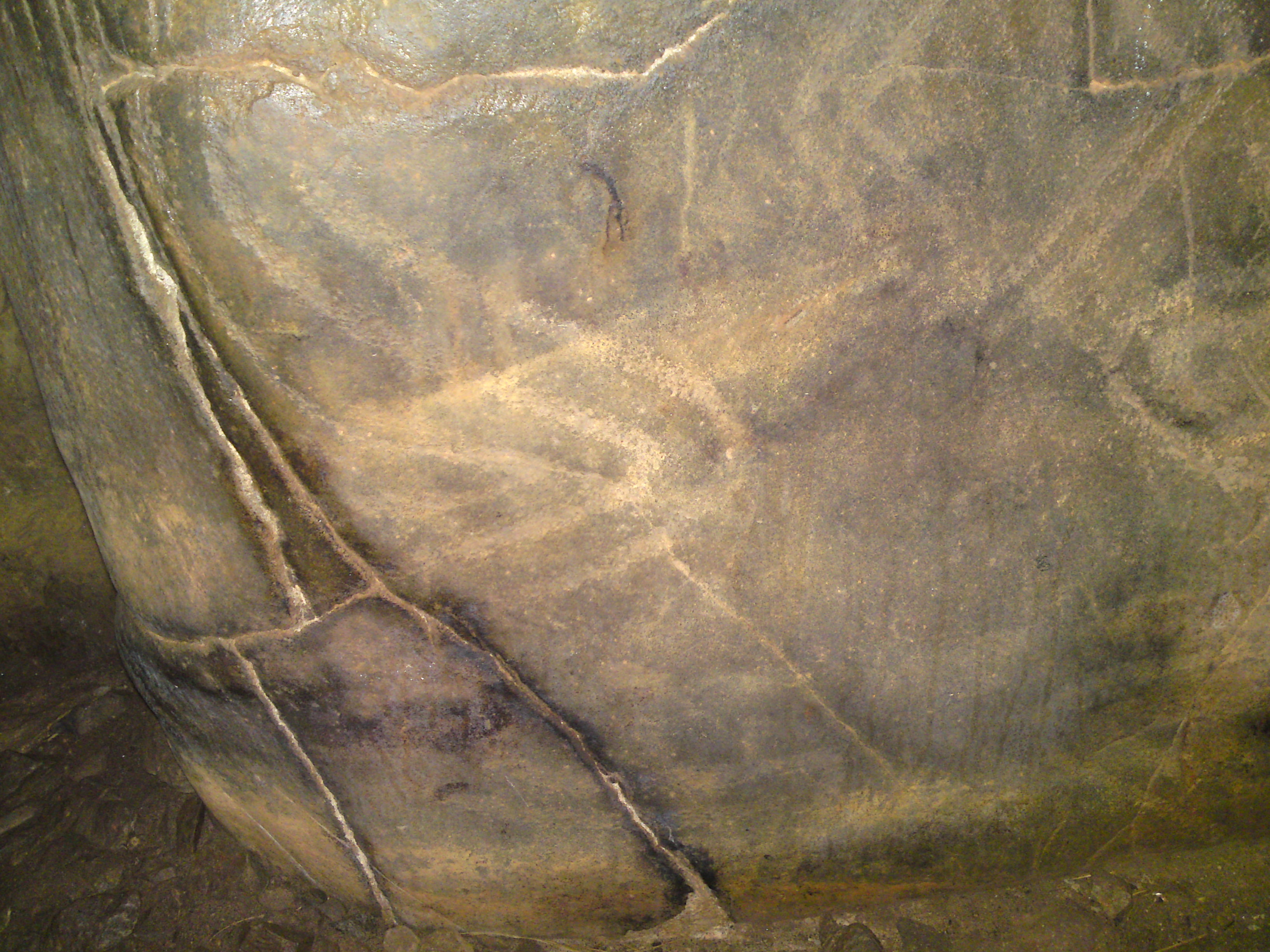
Chevron marks on stone in chamber

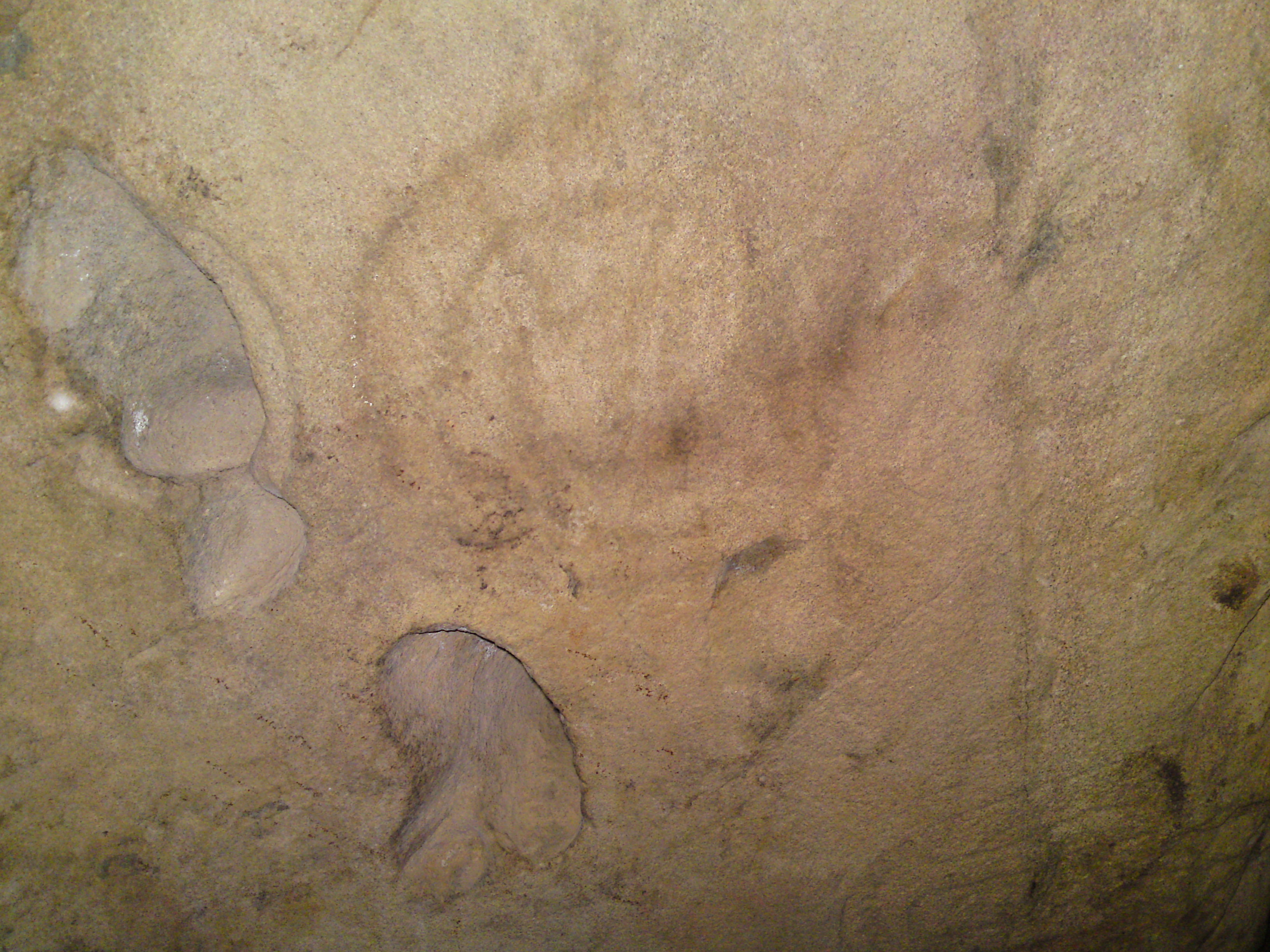
Spiral mark on stone in chamber

== See also ==
- Petrosomatoglyph Wavy lines, spirals, chevrons and lozenge petroglyphs.
- List of Cadw properties
