= Rock Art and the Prehistory of Atlantic Europe =

Book by Richard Bradley

Rock Art and the Prehistory of Atlantic Europe: Signing the Land
- The first English-language edition of the book, featuring a reconstruction of the rock art at Roughting Linn.
- Author: Richard Bradley
- Language: English
- Subject: Archaeology
- Publisher: Routledge
- Publication date: 1997
- Publication place: United Kingdom
- Media type: Print (Hardback and paperback)
- Pages: 238
- ISBN: 978-0415165365

Rock Art and the Prehistory of Atlantic Europe: Signing the Land is an archaeological book authored by the English academic Richard Bradley of the University of Reading. It was first published by Routledge in 1997.

Taking Atlantic Europe as its area of focus, Bradley's book deals with Neolithic and Bronze Age rock art in the British Isles and in Galicia.

== Synopsis ==
Bradley's first chapter provides a brief introduction to the topic. Chapter two introduces the prehistory of Atlantic Europe, exploring ideas regarding societal connections between Galicia and various parts of the British Isles where rock art is found. The third chapter goes into greater depth into Atlantic rock art, discussing various scholars' views on the connection between the petroglyphs of different regions.

== Reviews ==
Caroline Malone of Queen's University, Belfast reviewed Bradley's tome for Antiquity alongside his later publication, The Significance of Monuments.

== See also ==
- List of Stone Age art
