= Cruciform passage grave =

Cruciform passage graves describes a complex example of prehistoric passage grave found in Ireland, west Wales and Orkney and built during the later Neolithic, from around 3500 BC and later.

They are distinguished by a long passage leading to a central chamber with a corbelled roof. From this, burial chambers extend in three directions, giving the overall impression in plan of a cross shape layout. Some examples have further sub-chambers leading off the three original chambers. The network of chambers is covered by a cairn and revetted with a kerb.

A common trait is megalithic art carved into the stones of the chambers' walls and roofs. Abstract designs were favoured, especially spirals and zig-zags.

Examples are Newgrange in Ireland, Maeshowe in Orkney and Barclodiad y Gawres in Anglesey.
