= The Significance of Monuments =

Book by Richard Bradley

The Significance of Monuments: On the Shaping of Human Experience in Neolithic and Bronze Age Europe
- The first English-language edition of the book, featuring a photomontage artwork by Mark Johnston.
- Author: Richard Bradley
- Language: English
- Subject: Archaeology
- Publisher: Routledge
- Publication date: 1998
- Publication place: United Kingdom
- Media type: Print (Hardback and paperback)
- Pages: 179
- ISBN: 0-415-15204-6

The Significance of Monuments: On the Shaping of Human Experience in Neolithic and Bronze Age Europe is an archaeological book authored by the English academic Richard Bradley of the University of Reading. It was first published by Routledge in 1998.

Adopting a chronological approach from the Mesolithic through the Neolithic and into the Early Bronze Age, Bradley discusses the various different types of monuments that were constructed in Europe during this period, from the passage tombs and causewayed enclosures to the later stone circles. Throughout, he offers new interpretations of the evidence, often criticising older viewpoints.

== Synopsis ==
Chapter one, "Structures of Sand", introduces the themes that Bradley explores in the book, and outlines prior archaeological approaches to understanding the Neolithic. In the second chapter, "Thinking the Neolithic", Bradley argues that Mesolithic European worldviews centred on fertility and regeneration, with no distinction made between humans and the natural world. In the third chapter, "The death of the house", Bradley suggests that the Early Neolithic long mounds, which were used as burial monuments, had their symbolic origins in decaying and collapsing longhouses, postulating a relation between the "houses of the living" and the "houses of the dead". Chapter four, "Another Time" argues against prior suggestions that Early Neolithic burial mounds represent a focus on the ancestors. Instead he suggests that it was the passage tombs that held such an ancestor-focus, because they permitted the living to enter into the tomb, where the dead were stored. The fifth chapter, "Small Worlds", examines the causewayed enclosures, arguing that these earthworks established a new sense of place and sacred geography in Neolithic Europe.

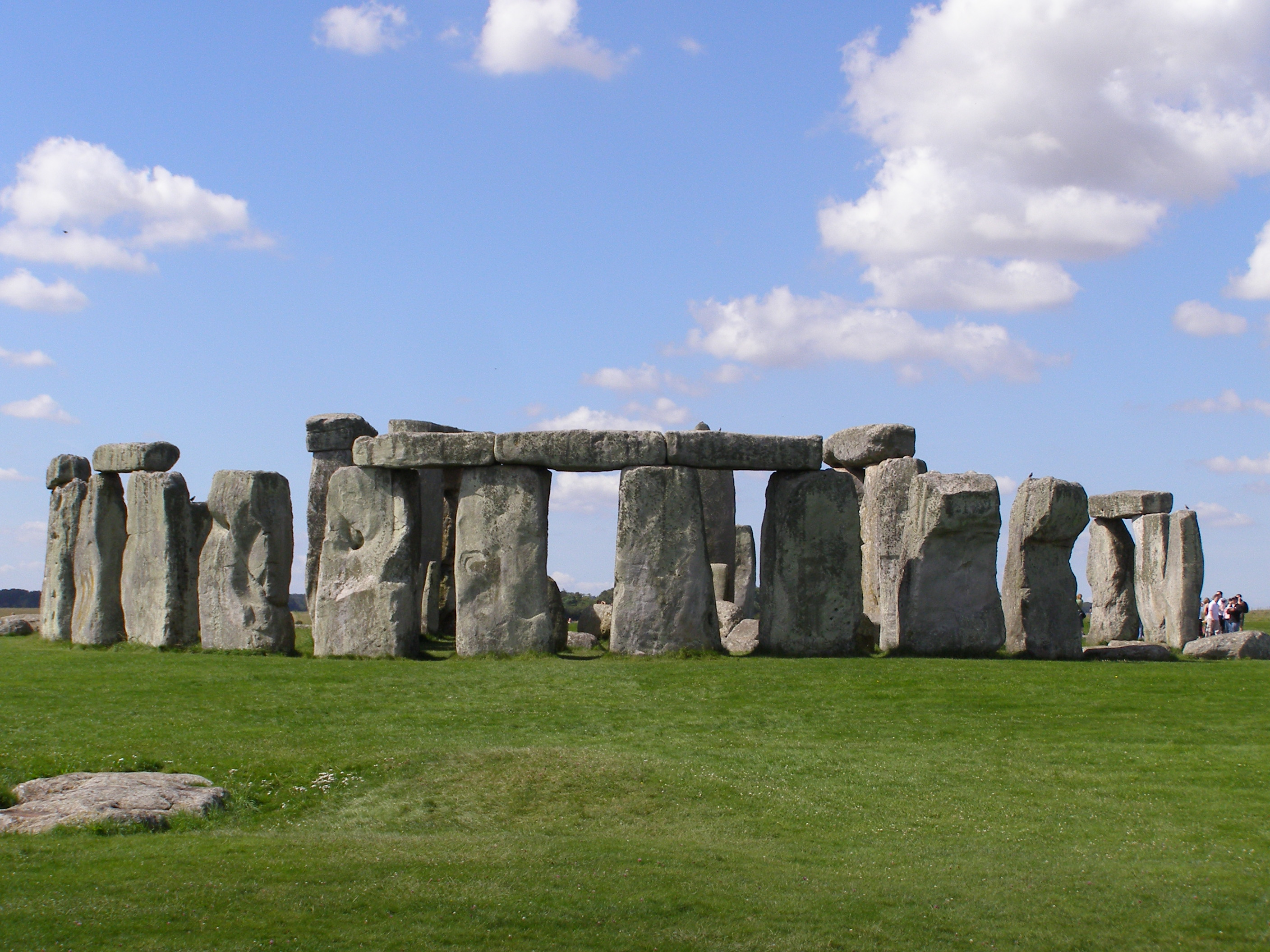
Bradley devotes the sixth chapter to a discussion of Stonehenge in Wiltshire.

Part Two, "Describing a circle", opens with chapter six, "The persistence of memory", in which Bradley argues that ritual employs a distinctive notion of time that differs from everyday time, and he turns to Stonehenge in order to further this point. Chapter seven, "The public interest", debates why the monuments of the Late Neolithic and Early Bronze Age British Isles were based on a circular archetype, suggesting that they reflect a cosmological worldview and create a theatre for public participation in cultic behaviour; throughout, he uses Newgrange in Ireland as an example. In the eighth chapter, "Theatre in the Round," Bradley studies the stone circles in the British Isles and Brittany, arguing that they were constructed with explicit links to the wider landscape, in contrast to the earlier henges, which restricted visibility to the surrounding area. In the penultimate chapter, "Closed Circles", Bradley examines how the stone circles were converted into cemeteries during the Early Bronze Age. Chapter ten, "An agricultural revolution," looks at the transition to agriculture at prehistoric monuments in the mid-second millennium BCE, suggesting that many of the features of the "Neolithic Revolution" only occurred at this time.

== Reviews ==
Caroline Malone of Queen's University, Belfast reviewed Bradley's tome for the Antiquity journal alongside his earlier publication, Rock Art and the Prehistory of Atlantic Europe. Noting that many books on landscape archaeology were far-fetched, she thanked Bradley for producing such "sane" yet "deeply perceptive" volumes on the subject, stating that his use of language was didactic and "beautifully written". Believing it to be a useful source to learn about current debates in the field, she concludes that the book would be indispensable to archaeologists and scholars, if not students looking for a textbook on later prehistory.

In Past, the newsletter of The Prehistoric Society, Rob Young of the University of Leicester praised the book as "another richly flavoured offering". Thinking it represented "Bradley at his best", he encouraged students, professional archaeologists and interested lay people to read it.
