= Ritual and Domestic Life in Prehistoric Europe =

Book by Richard Bradley

- The first English-language edition of the book.
- Author: Richard Bradley
- Language: English
- Subject: Archaeology
- Publisher: Routledge
- Publication date: 2005
- Publication place: United Kingdom
- Media type: Print (Hardback and paperback)
- Pages: 234
- ISBN: 978-0415345514

Ritual and Domestic Life in Prehistoric Europe is a book by the English archaeologist Richard Bradley of the University of Reading. It was first published by Routledge in 2005.

Bradley questions whether a distinction can be drawn between ritual and non-ritual behavior in prehistoric Europe, citing ethnographic comparisons and archaeological examples to suggest that ritualised activities were a part of domestic life and agriculture.

== Synopsis ==
Part One, "The Importance of Ordinary Things", opens with chapter one, "Death and the Harvest", in which Bradley looks at the manner in which archaeologists have differentiated between ritual and domestic life. Discussing the Galician hórreos, or raised storehouses, he uses them as an example to highlight that both ritual and domestic features can be found in the same structure. Moving on to other archaeological examples, he discusses Durrington Walls in Wiltshire, England, and then the viereckschanzen of southern Germany and Bohemia. He then rounds off the chapter with a discussion of what ritual is, citing the work of social anthropologists and ritual studies scholars like Jack Goody, Maurice Bloch and Catherine Bell, emphasising that ritual is a form of action. Chapter two, "The consecration of the house" explores ritual elements in the domestic sphere, beginning with an examination of Gamla Uppsala and moving on to suggest that across Northern Europe, houses were used as Celtic buildings on certain occasions, citing ethnographic examples from the Maori of New Zealand. Bradley proceeds to an examination of instances where graves have been placed over houses in prehistoric Europe.
