= Neolithic and Bronze Age rock art in the British Isles =

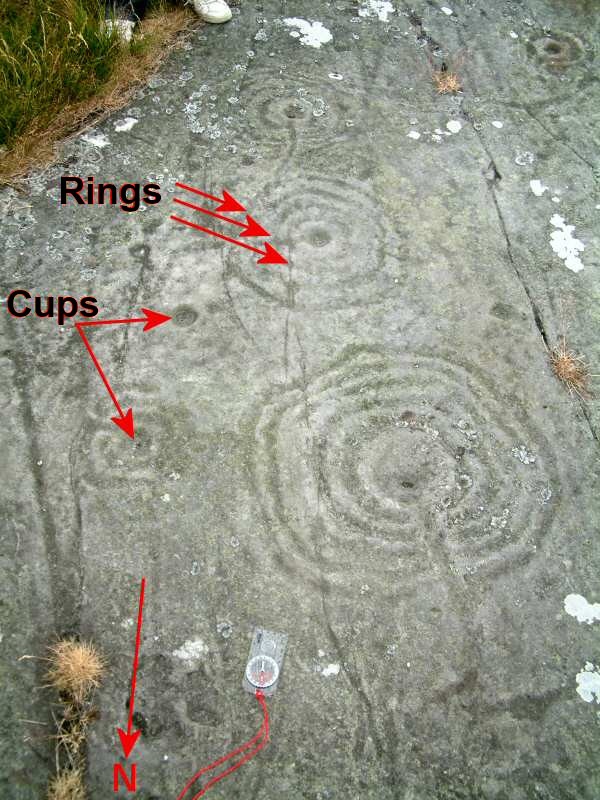
Typical cup and ring marks at Weetwood Moor, in the English county of Northumberland

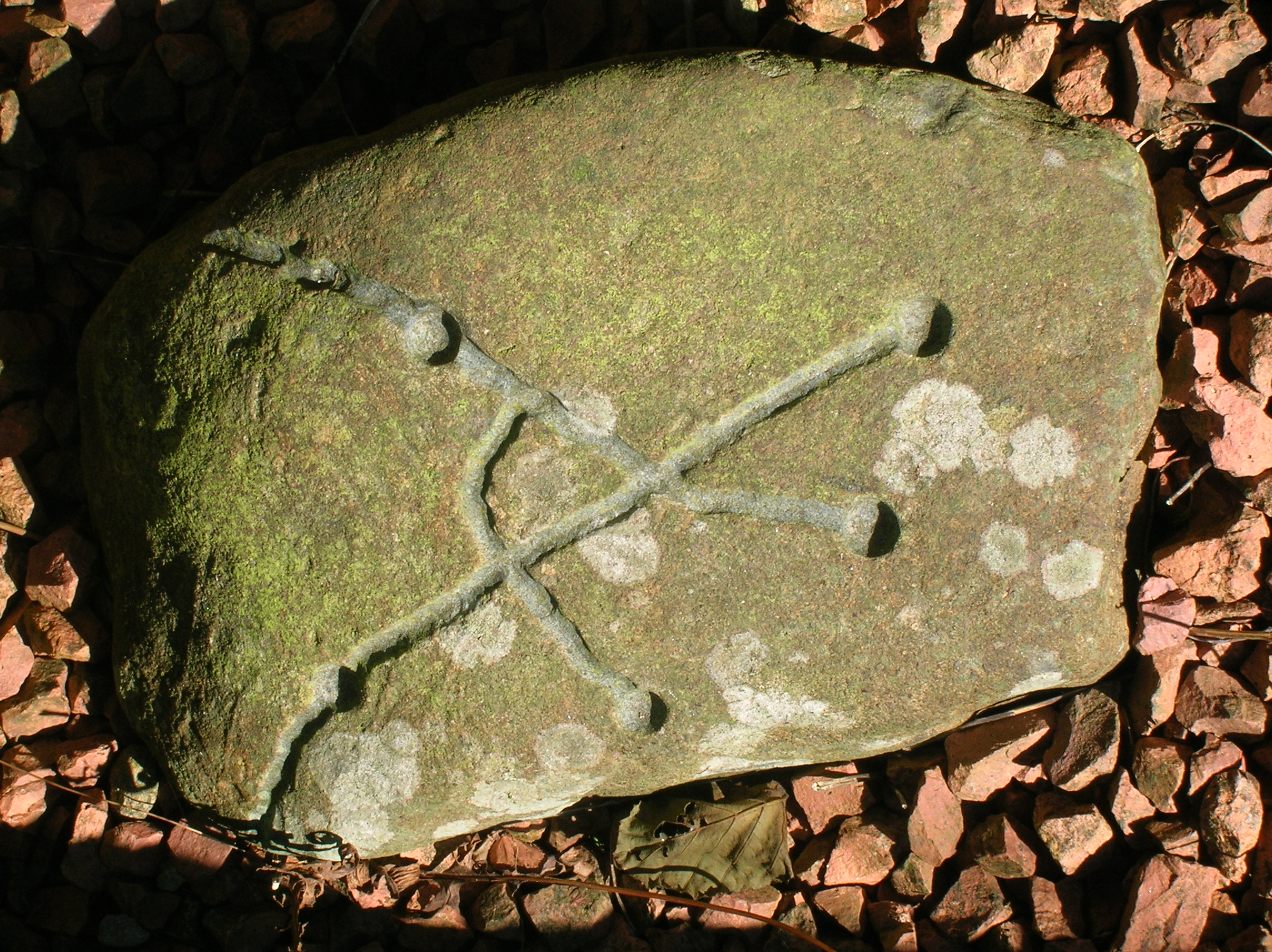
A replica of an unusual cup-and-ring-marked stone from Dalgarven, North Ayrshire, Scotland.

In the Neolithic and Bronze Age of Ireland and the British Isles, rock art was produced across various parts of the islands. Petroglyphic in nature, the majority of such carvings are abstract in design, usually cup and ring marks, although examples of spirals or figurative depictions of weaponry are also known. Only one form of rock art in Europe, this late prehistoric tradition had connections with others along Atlantic Europe, particularly in Galicia.

The study of rock art in Ireland and the British Isles was largely initiated by amateur researchers rather than academic or other professional archaeologists.

Surviving examples of rock art in Ireland and the British Isles are believed to represent only a small sample of that which had been produced in the Neolithic and Bronze Ages. Many examples of petroglyphs would have eroded away, thereby being lost to contemporary scholarship. In other examples, images might have been painted onto rock, or marked onto less permanent surfaces, such as wood, livestock or the human body, thereby also failing to survive into the present.

== Chronology ==
Rock art had first appeared in Atlantic Europe by the late fourth millennium BCE. In Britain, rock art had ceased by the time of the agricultural intensification in the Late Bronze Age, the first millennium BCE.

== Distribution ==
=== Northern Britain ===
Within Britain, the majority of recorded Neolithic and Bronze Age rock art comes from the northern part of the island. Cup-and-ring marks are particularly common in this area.

Cup-and-ring marks are usually attributed to the Neolithic and Early Bronze Ages, while attempts at building a relative chronology have been tried in Dunbartonshire.

=== South West Britain ===
Over 70 examples of late prehistoric rock art have been identified in the South West of Britain, being far sparser than those found in the North. This may in part be due to the harder nature of the natural rock in the area, which is largely plutonic granite, alongside a lack of research focused in this region. Rock art specialist George Nash considered the petroglyphs of this region to constitute a distinct artistic tradition from that in the North. The majority of petroglyphs in South West Britain are cup marks, engraved both onto the rock face and on boulders, as at the Castallack Menhir.

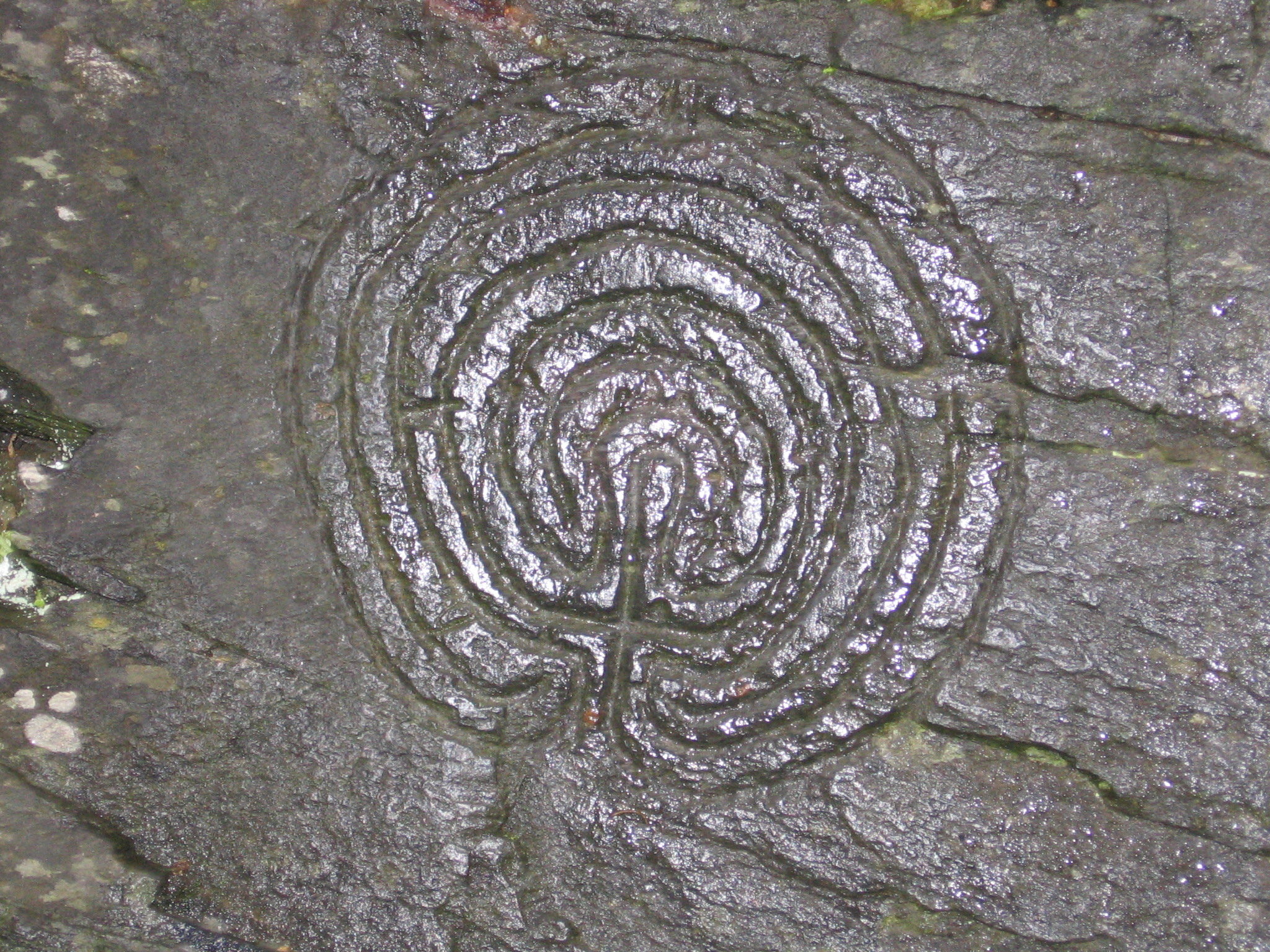
One of the Rocky Valley labyrinths.

Archaeologists are aware of three instances in South West Britain where weapons are depicted in petroglyphs: at Boscawen-un stone circle in Cornwall, at Badbury Rings Barrow in Dorset, and at Stonehenge in Wiltshire. Using relative dating, the weapons depicted on Boscawen-un have been tentatively dated to circa 2000 BCE, while those at Badbury Rings and Stonehenge have been dated to c. 1800 BCE.

Several petroglyphic labyrinths have also been discovered in South West Britain. The best known of these are a neighbouring pair that have been found engraved onto a shale outcrop at Rocky Valley, Cornwall. Apparently incised using a metal implement, Nash suggested that the southern labyrinth had previously been engraved using a stone tool. Publicly revealed in 1948, it has been suggested that they are Bronze Age in date, due to similarities with Bronze Age petroglyphs in Galicia and Valcamonica. Conversely, many rock art researchers do not consider them to be prehistoric, with Saward arguing that they were created between the 16th and 18th-centuries, when the neighbouring Trewethett Mill was operational. As evidence, she noted that labyrinths were a popular motif in folk customs at the time, and that the good state of preservation would not be present if they had prehistoric origins.

=== Ireland ===
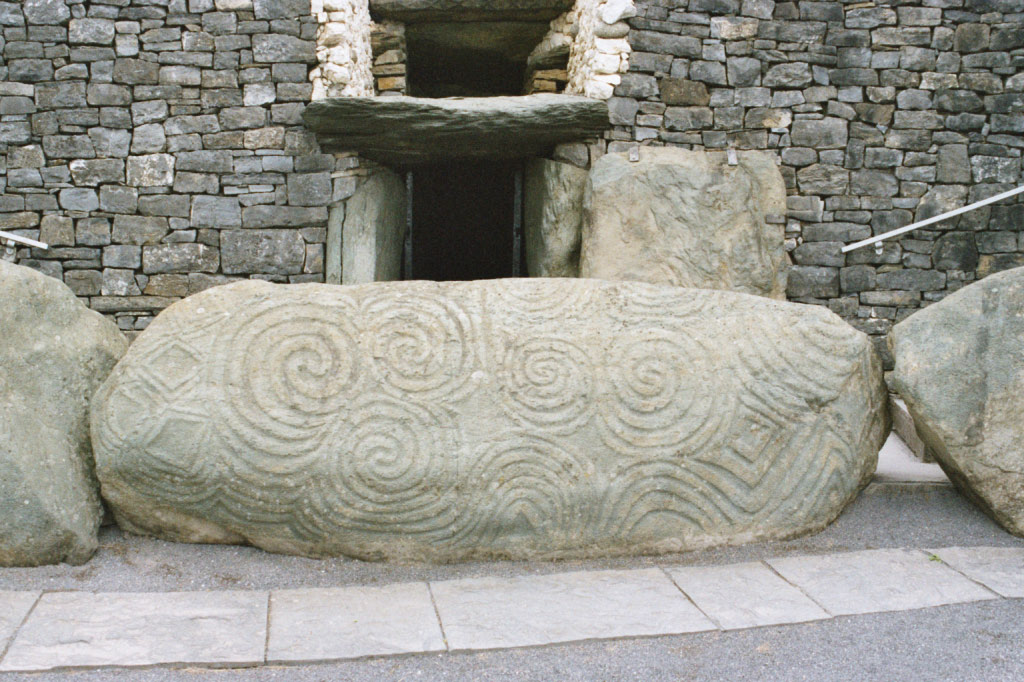
Engravings at the entrance to Newgrange.

Cup-and-ring marks are particularly common in this area. The greatest concentrations of open-air rock art occur in Fermnanagh/Donegal, Wicklow/Carlow, Louth/Monaghan, Cork, and Kerry. The Dingle and Iveragh peninsulas in Kerry have a particularly high density of rock art panels.

Petroglyphs can be found carved onto Early Neolithic passage tombs, such as Newgrange.

== Research ==
Throughout the British Isles, most of the research into rock art has been undertaken by amateurs rather than professional archaeologists, to varying degrees of quality.

In 1997, archaeologist Richard Bradley of the University of Reading published Rock Art and the Prehistory of Atlantic Europe, the first study of such petroglyphs across Atlantic Europe. In 1999, Stan Beckensall published British Prehistoric Rock Art, the first regional overview of the island's rock art.

== Purpose ==
The purposes of Neolithic and Bronze Age petroglyphs in the British Isles have long been debated, with amateur rock art researcher Ronald Morris listing 104 different proposals that he had encountered, ranking them according to what he believed to be their plausibility. It has been noted that the meanings and usage of such rock art might have changed over time, as they came to be encountered by communities unaware of their original purpose.

=== Directional signs ===
Smith and Walker suggested that British cupmarks may have acted as directional signs, being placed alongside pathways to guide those travelling along them.

=== Entoptic phenomenon and altered states of consciousness ===
One suggestion is that the motifs found in the rock art of the British Isles are depictions of phosphenes, entoptic phenomenon produced through the disturbance of the optic nerve that result from altered states of consciousness. Such altered states might have been induced by the use of hallucinogenic drugs, evidence for which exists from Neolithic and Bronze Age Europe.

This idea was first applied to the petroglyphs on the Neolithic monuments of the British Isles by David Lewis-Williams and T. Dowson. They noted that the depiction of phosphenes could appear independently in different areas due their common basis in the human nervous system. Lewis-Williams and David Pearce expanded on this idea in their book Inside the Neolithic Mind. Bradley extended these ideas to suggest that the circular designs on open air petroglyphs might have represented a pathway that led into the rock.

Dronfield defended the entoptic explanation by way of ethnographic comparison. Examining art produced by a society that placed great emphasis on altered states of consciousness with another that did not, he highlighted that the former contained motifs identified as phosphenes while the latter did not. Although believing that it represents "a helpful clue to the roots of Atlantic rock art", Bradley noted that even if the earliest instances of rock art were based upon entoptic phenomenon, they may have become divorced from their original inspiration as they were more copied elsewhere.

=== Water symbolism ===
Smith and Walker also suggested that cup-and-ring marks were symbolically linked to water, having sacred associations in late prehistoric society. As evidence, they noted that a number of the larger cups, which they refer to as basins, would have collected rain water. They believed that cup-and-ring markings looked like the ripples produced when raindrops hit water.

== See also ==
- List of Stone Age art
