= Rock art of Europe =

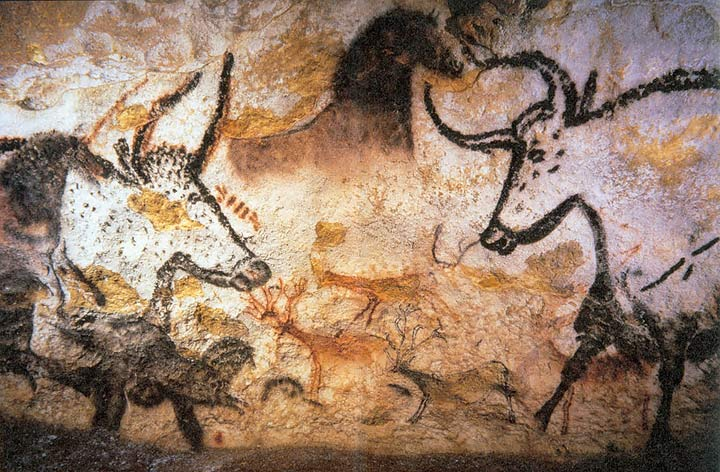
Rock art paintings of aurochs at the Upper Palaeolithic cave site of Lascaux in southwestern France.

Rock art has been produced in Europe since the Upper Palaeolithic period through to recent centuries. It is found in all of the major regions of the continent. One of the most famous examples of parietal art is the Grotte Chauvet in France. The cultural purpose of these remnants of the Paleolithic and other periods of prehistoric art is not known. However, some theories suggest that, because these paintings were created in parts of the caves that were not easily accessed, it is unlikely that they were intended simply as decoration.

In the post-Palaeolithic period, during later prehistory, regional variants grew up across the continent, being produced by settled, agricultural communities.

Scholarly interest in European rock art began in the 17th century.

== Background ==
The defining characteristic of rock art is the fact that it is placed on natural rock surfaces; in this way it is distinct from artworks placed on constructed walls or free-standing sculpture. As such, rock art is a form of landscape art, and includes designs that have been placed on boulder and cliff faces, cave walls and ceilings, and on the ground surface. Rock art is a global phenomenon, being found in many different regions of the world.

There are various different forms of rock art. This includes pictographs, which were painted or drawn onto the panel (rock surface), petroglyphs, which were carved or engraved onto the panel, and earth figures such as earthforms, intaglios and geoglyphs. Some archaeologists also consider pits and grooves in the rock, known as cups, rings or cupules, as a form of rock art.

Although there are some exceptions, the majority of rock art whose creation was ethnographically recorded had been produced during rituals. As such, the study of rock art is a component of the archaeology of religion.

The academic field of rock art studies, a form of archaeology, investigates instances of past rock art to learn about the societies that produced it. Caves with spectacular artwork also have been found in Africa (e.g. Namibia), Argentina, Australia, China, India, and other locations. Published discussions of discoveries of cave art that date to the nineteenth century, long before scientific dating was possible, resulted in frequent debates regarding the antiquity of the art. Some scholars at the time developed a typology that was overthrown when AMS radiocarbon dating became available.

== Interpretations ==
Initial interpretations of the art at Lascaux and in other related grottoes, suggested that the paintings and engravings were decorative, or just art for art's sake. Toward the middle of the twentieth century, new theories suggested that the cave art had deep links to prehistoric rituals promoting fertility and successful hunting. Supporting that later interpretation, recent scientific studies have found a systematic sequencing in the representations of horses, aurochs (an extinct ancestor of domestic cattle), and stags that corresponds to the seasonal characteristics of each species that may be identified as distinctively related to spring, summer, and autumn.

== Major Upper Paleolithic sites with rock art ==
More than 300 caves with parietal art from prehistoric times have been discovered in Spain and France. Entrances to some have been discovered underwater, having been inundated as the seas have risen with time.

- Chauvet Cave, Vallon-Pont-d'Arc, France — Discovered in 1994 and dating from 37,000 B.C., Chauvet cave has two main chambers. In the first, most images are red, while in the second, most of the animals are represented in black. The most spectacular images are the Horse Panel and the Panel of Lions and Rhinoceroses.
- Caves of Arcy-sur-Cure, Arcy-sur-Cure, Burgundy, France — Long known only for the existence of the cave, its parietal art was not discovered until 1990. Dating from 28,000 B.C., it is the second oldest known parietal artwork, after that of the Chauvet cave.
- Cosquer Cave, near Marseille, France — Discovered by the deep-sea diver Henri Cosquer in 1985 and dating from 25,000 B.C., the entrance to Cosquer cave is more than 100 feet below sea level. It contains hand stencils, charcoal drawings, and approximately 100 polychrome paintings of horses and other animals.
- Pech Merle Cave, Cabrerets, Midi-Pyrénées, France — Discovered in 1922 and dating from 25,000 B.C., Pech-Merle is famous for its dappled horses drawn in charcoal and painted with ochre on limestone. For details and photographs, please see Pech-Merle Cave Paintings.
- Lascaux Cave, Montignac, Dordogne, France — Discovered in 1940 and dating from 17,000 B.C., Lascaux contains seven decorated chambers with more than 2000 painted images, including the extraordinary Hall of the Bulls which, despite the name given to it, features mostly pregnant horses as well as the aurochs bulls (wild cattle) from which its name was derived.
- Font de Gaume, in the Dordogne Valley in France — Discovered in 1901 and dating from 17,000 B.C., Font de Gaume cave contains more than 200 polychrome paintings from the Solutrean-Magdalenian culture—second only in France to Lascaux in quality—featuring approximately 80 bison, 40 horses, and 20 mammoths.
- Cave of La Pasiega, Cuevas de El Castillo, Cantabria, Spain — Discovered in 1911 and dating from 16,000 B.C., the cave of La Pasiega consists of one main gallery, approximately 80 yards in length, with openings to several secondary galleries. Its artwork consists of more than 700 painted images (approximately 100 deer, 80 horses, 30 ibex, and 30 cattle, as well as images of birds, fish, mammoths, and reindeer) and includes numerous abstract symbols (ideomorphs) and engravings.
- Cave of Altamira, near Santillana del Mar, Cantabria, Spain — Discovered in 1879 and dating from 15,000 B.C., the parietal art on the Altamira ceiling is regarded as the crowning artistic achievement of the Magdalenian period. The cave, along with that of Chauvet and those of Lascaux, has been regarded by archaeologists and art historians as "the Sistine Chapel of Paleolithic art", due to its high quality and large scale wall paintings. The so-called polychrome chamber houses approximately 30 large animal images, mostly of bison, vividly executed in red and black pigment. For details and photographs, please see: Altamira Cave Paintings.

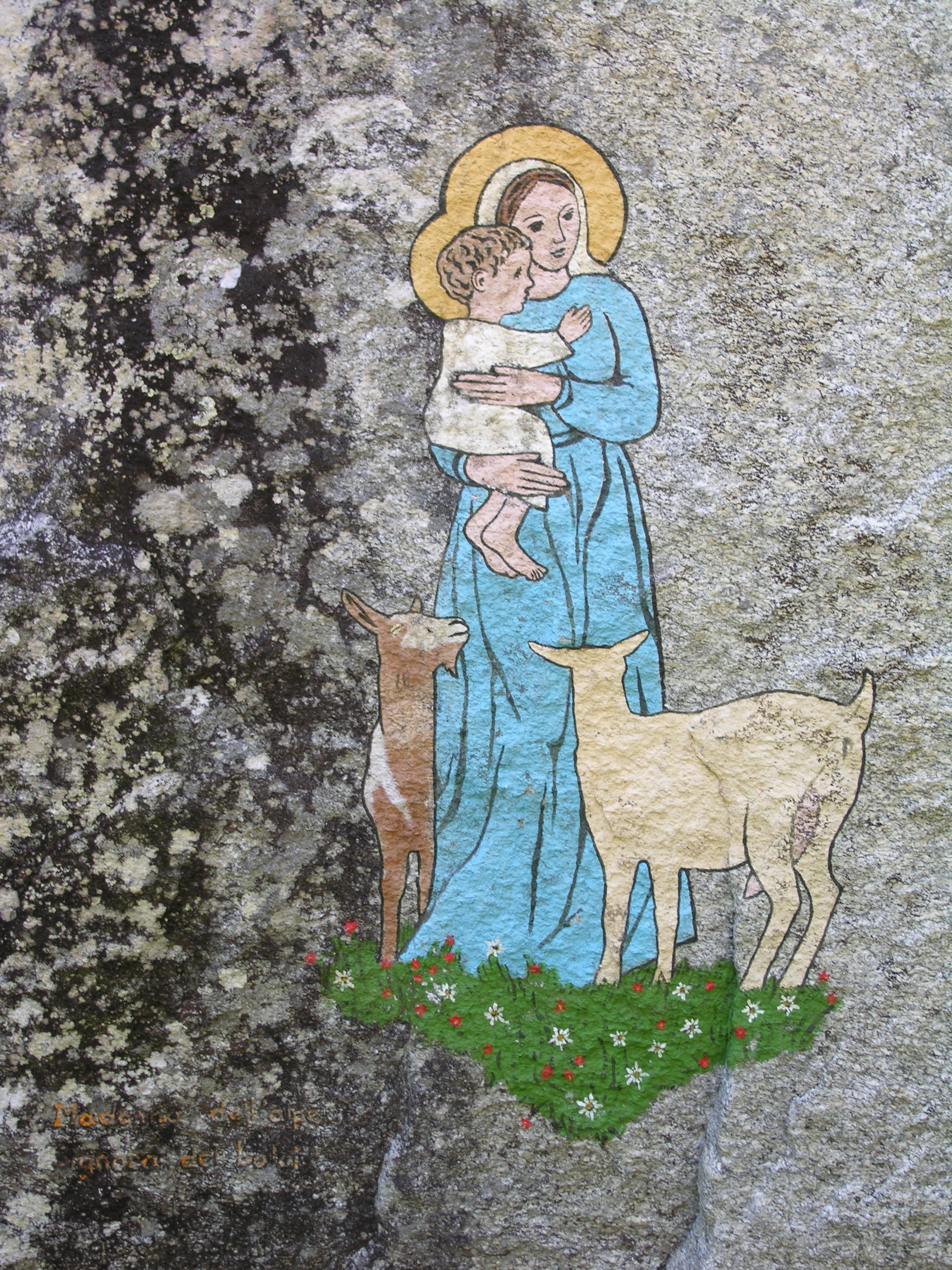
A modern painting of the Virgin Mary in the Calnegia valley in the Swiss Alps

== Mesolithic ==
A later type of parietal art that is categorized as the rock art of the Iberian Mediterranean Basin has been found in more than 700 caves and rock shelters. Generally, that artwork is painted in a distinctively different style from earlier parietal art and contains far more human figures.

== Neolithic, Copper Age and Bronze Age rock art ==
=== Atlantic European rock art ===
Various different forms of late prehistoric rock art have been found in Atlantic Europe, the coastal region that extends from the Strait of Gibraltar up to the British Isles. The term Atlantic rock art was popularised in the 1990s by archaeologist Richard Bradley. The art is characterised by abstract geometric motifs, most notably the cup-and-ring motifs. The art can be found in Portugal, France, Spain, Britain, and Ireland. Although the art is characterised by abstract motifs it is sometimes found alongside figurative carvings, such as those at Galicia in North western Spain. Furthermore, several sites in Northern and Central Portugal, namely at the Côa Valley, Ponte da Góia, Abrigo da Faia rocks, Sever do Vouga, and several locations along the Vouga River, and Minho River bassins, and another discovery made in Argyll in Scotland, in 2020.

The carvings associated with the tradition of Atlantic rock art in Europe are often found in rural settings, in open-air landscapes and occur on boulders and outcrops. Many of these panels remain in situ, however some smaller more portable examples have been moved to museums for safe keeping. The abstract nature of many of these carvings provide us with very little information of their purpose in prehistory. However, this art form has become the topic of several excavations and studies throughout Europe in recent years. Many of these studies consider a landscape approach.

The associated motifs consist of cup-marks (circular man-made depressions) often surrounded by one or more concentric rings that regularly feature an extending radial groove. Another common motif is the rosette motif which consists of a circular pattern of cup-marks. There is evidence for regional variation amongst this tradition. Many archaeologists and scholars have theorised on the purpose of the art but given its mostly abstract nature and little direct context for its presence on rock surfaces, it is difficult to form a conclusive explanation for it. A widely considered theory is that the art marks routeways and boundaries within prehistoric societies.

Perhaps the most well-known landscape of Atlantic rock art in Europe is that of Galicia in north-western Spain at the Campo do Lameiro archaeological park. The majority of the carvings are situated in the Valley of the River Lérez. Over a span of 21.8 hectares hundreds of carvings can be found on the surface of rock panels in various clusters throughout the park. Along with the abstract/ geometric motifs, zoomorphs and anthropomorphs can be seen and many of these combinations form visual representations of hunting scenes.

There are over 6000 examples of Atlantic art in the UK and of these over 2000 can be found in Scotland with the highest concentration found in Kilmartin Glenn, Argyll. Northern England is host to several rock art landscapes most notably in the counties of Northumberland and Durham. In recent years many conservation and recording initiatives have been undertaken in this region by archaeologists at the University of Newcastle.

In Ireland the Atlantic rock art appears in clusters throughout the country, the most significant of those occur in counties Fermanagh/Donegal, Wicklow/Carlow, Louth/Monaghan, and Cork, with the highest concentration occurring in County Kerry on the Dingle and Iveragh Peninsulas.

During the Early Bronze Age, which lasted from circa 2300 through to c.1500 BCE, various depictions of weaponry were engraved onto rock surfaces across Atlantic Europe.

=== Northern European rock art ===
There are hundreds of rock art sites that represent variations of figures, traditions and chronological differences in Northern Europe. Cave paintings, rock paintings and especially open air sites are found on the continent, the British isles and all over the Scandinavian peninsula as well as in Finland and Russia. Perhaps the most famous site is the Rock carvings at Alta in the north of Norway with the largest collection of hunter gatherer rock art in northern Europe.

The Alta rock art collection, discovered in the 1970s, has undergone extensive study and analysis. Researchers have focused on themes like religious practices, Arctic cultural beliefs, geographical contexts, and social communication. While the interpretive framework has expanded over time, there has been little scholarly debate or disagreement. This has resulted in a relatively uniform set of interpretations that determine which explanations are considered valid or acceptable. The paper critiques how researchers use ethnographic evidence and concepts like Arctic cultural connections, religious rituals, and spiritual practices in their interpretations. It also challenges the increasingly complex theories that view rock art as a powerful tool for shaping worldviews and facilitating communication. The paper questions the scholarly drive to uncover "deeper meanings" and proposes different approaches to studying rock art.

The Alta rock art encompasses all prehistoric carved and painted images found in the Alta region of Northern Norway. Created over 5,000 years, this extensive collection contains 5,500-7,000 individual pieces (depending on classification methods) with diverse subjects, artistic styles, and site locations. These works provide rich material for studying chronology, cultural groupings, artistic traditions, and stylistic developments. They also offer insights into ancient environments, available resources, technologies, and the social practices and conditions of their creators. The fundamental question remains: what was their purpose and significance? While researchers don't typically adopt the dramatic perspective of scholar Mircea Eliade (who described "primitive man" as living in constant fear of natural forces failing), modern interpretations consistently emphasize themes of negotiation with spiritual forces, communication with spirits or communities, and efforts to maintain balance, structure, and control in both the natural and social worlds. This approach frames rock art creation as driven by essential needs, making it a matter of critical importance to ancient societies.

=== Alpine rock art ===
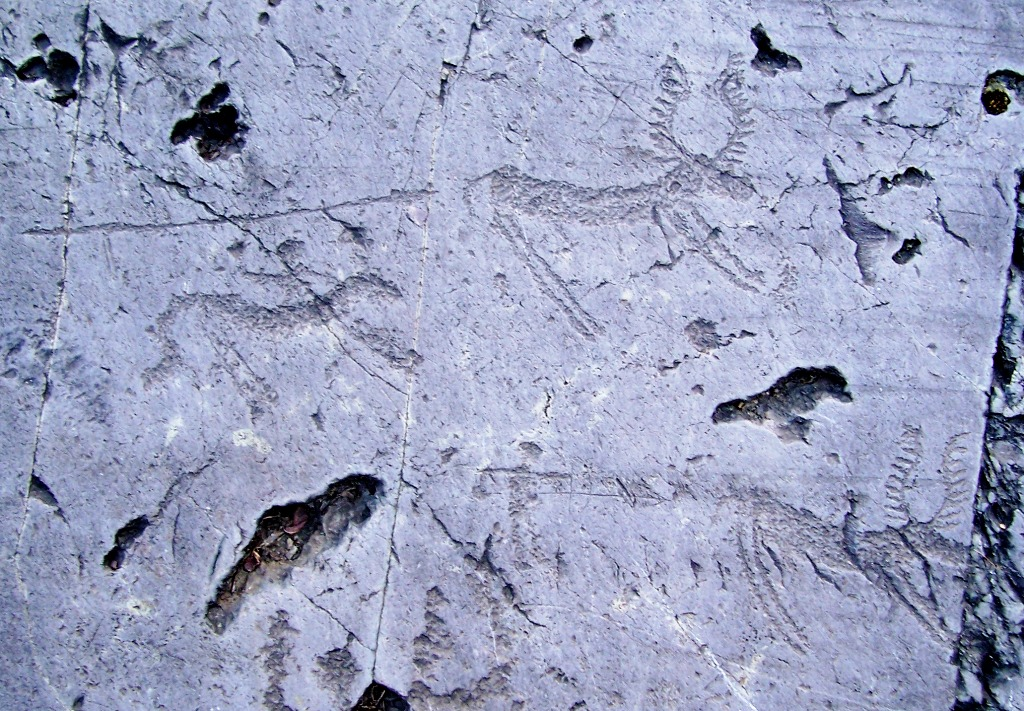
Engraved deer-hunting scene at Valcamonica, Northern Italy

Rock art engraved on open surfaces, rather than inside shelters or caves, was also produced in the mountainous Alpine region during later prehistory. Found predominantly in the southern part of the Alps, in modern-day Italy and France, few examples of rock art have been identified from the northern slopes of the region, in what is now Switzerland and Germany. Many engravings have been found in the region, along with a few rock paintings (as at Abri Faravel), and as such, scholars in rock art studies have divided the known collection into between 20 and 30 "regions" of Alpine rock art, the number depending upon how neighbouring occurrences are grouped. These petroglyphs were usually carved with a fine-line technique which meant that they are only a few millimetres thick, and were typically produced on metamorphic rocks, sandstones and schists which are found sporadically across the Alpine chain, rather than on the more common calcareous rocks from which the mountains are geologically formed.

Like with most rock art across the world, there are no physical-science methods yet available with which to accurately date the Alpine images, and instead archaeologists have relied on a relative chronology by comparing the pictures with artefacts that have been more securely dated.

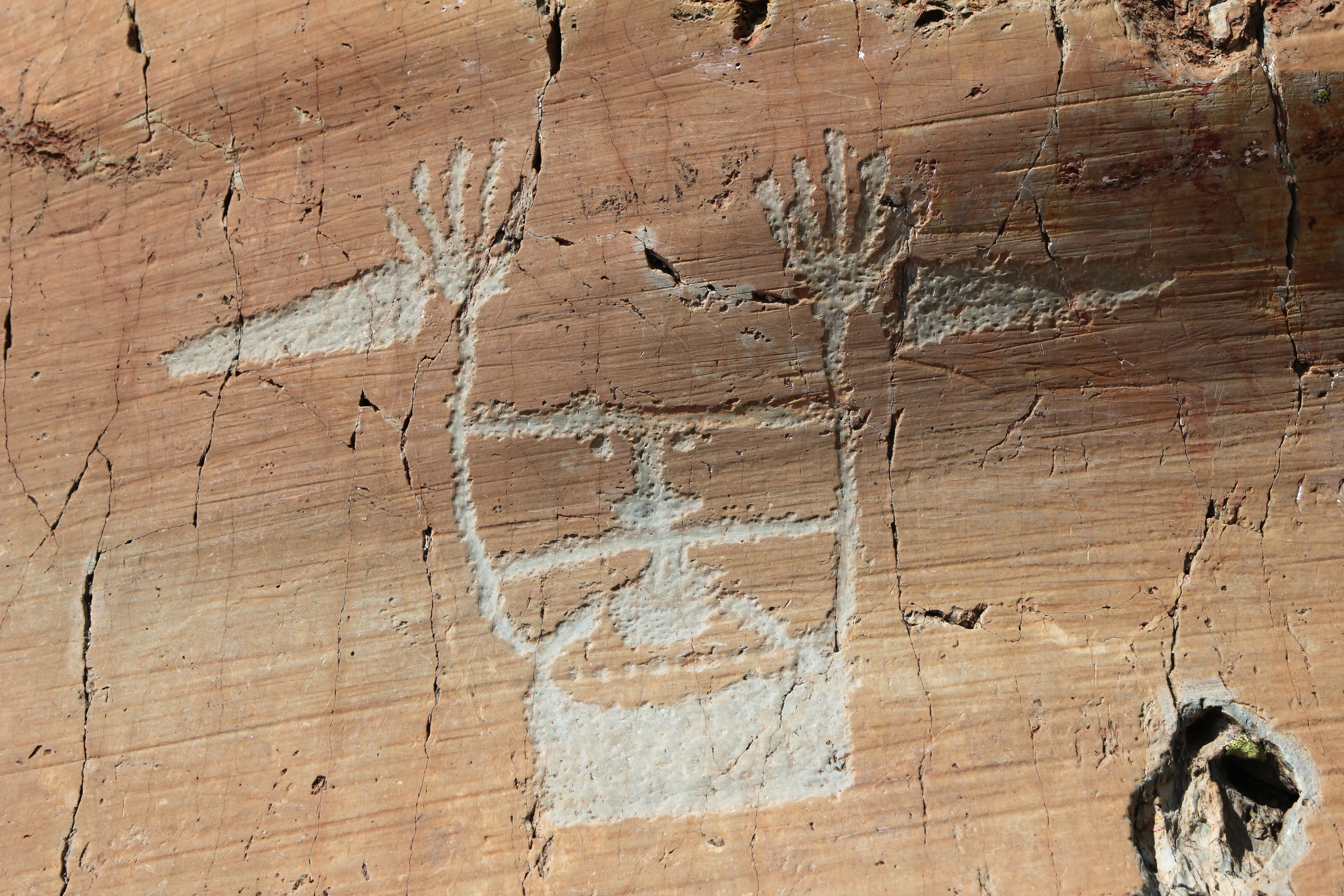
Le sorcier

The two most prominent concentrations of rock art in the Alps are found at Mont Bégo in France and the valleys of Valcamonica and Valtellina in Italy, both of which far outnumber other areas for the amount of art that they contain. At Mount Bego, in southwest France, near the Italian border, over 30,000 illustrated figures have been discovered in the valleys and outliers surrounding the mountain, situated on the high-altitude slopes far above the agricultural land. Archaeologists have dated to the images to the Copper and Bronze Ages, between 2500 and 1700 BCE, because many of the figures are depicted holding daggers and halberds which are stylistically consistent with this period. Similarly, many of the images depict oxen and ploughshares, meaning that they must have been produced following the adoption of agriculture during the Neolithic. It is believed that they all date from the same period, because they are all stylistically consistent and are in a similar state of preservation.

At Valcamonica and Valtellina, two lengthy neighbouring valleys in the south-centre of the Alps, archaeologists have estimated the existence of around 300,000 figures, with depictions or humans and other animals, footprints, steep-roofed buildings, wheeled carts, boats and a large number of geometric shapes, lines, spirals and crosses. Although a few of the images found in Valtellina have been tentatively suggested to be post-glacial in date due to the Palaeolithic animal style they depict, the overwhelming majority of artworks are considered to be late prehistoric. Some of the motifs, such as those of humans in an orant posture with arms upraised in prayer or adoration, have been considered Neolithic, with others being attributed to the Copper, Bronze and Iron Ages, the latter being the most numerous. Some of the illustrations have been dated to the historic period, having been produced by the local Camuni people (believed akin to the Rhaetians) who lived within the Roman Empire, and subsequently also from the Medieval period.

== Preservation ==
After its discovery, Lascaux quickly became a major tourist attraction. Eventually, its caretakers realized that the equilibrium of the climate in the cave that had kept the images intact for tens of thousands of years, was being disrupted by so many people visiting the cave. It was closed in 1963. Around 2000, the cave became filled with a fungus that many blamed on air conditioning, the use of high-powered lights, and the high number of visitors, all associated with the public access. The fungus had to be removed painstakingly by hand. Currently, in order to protect the artwork, only a few scientific experts are allowed to work inside the cave and just for a few days a month. The most representative bacterium (Pseudonocardia sp.) and fungus (Fusarium sp.) from the microbial communities of a cave containing the paleolithic paintings were isolated and their growth on natural substrates assessed. Development was analyzed with and without supplemented nutrients (glucose, ammonium, phosphate, peptone). Results showed that the assayed bacterium on natural substrate was able to develop best at in situ temperature and that the addition of organic nutrients and perhaps phosphate enhanced its growth. The growth of the assayed fungus, however, was limited by low temperature and the availability of ammonium. These results confirm a differential behavior of microorganisms between the laboratory and the natural environments and could explain previous invasion of fungi reported for some caves with prehistoric paintings.

== See also ==
- 2015 rock art find at Tømmerneset, Finnmark, Norway
