= Richard Bradley (archaeologist) =

British archaeologist and academic (born 1946)

Professor Richard Bradley FSA FSA Scot FBA
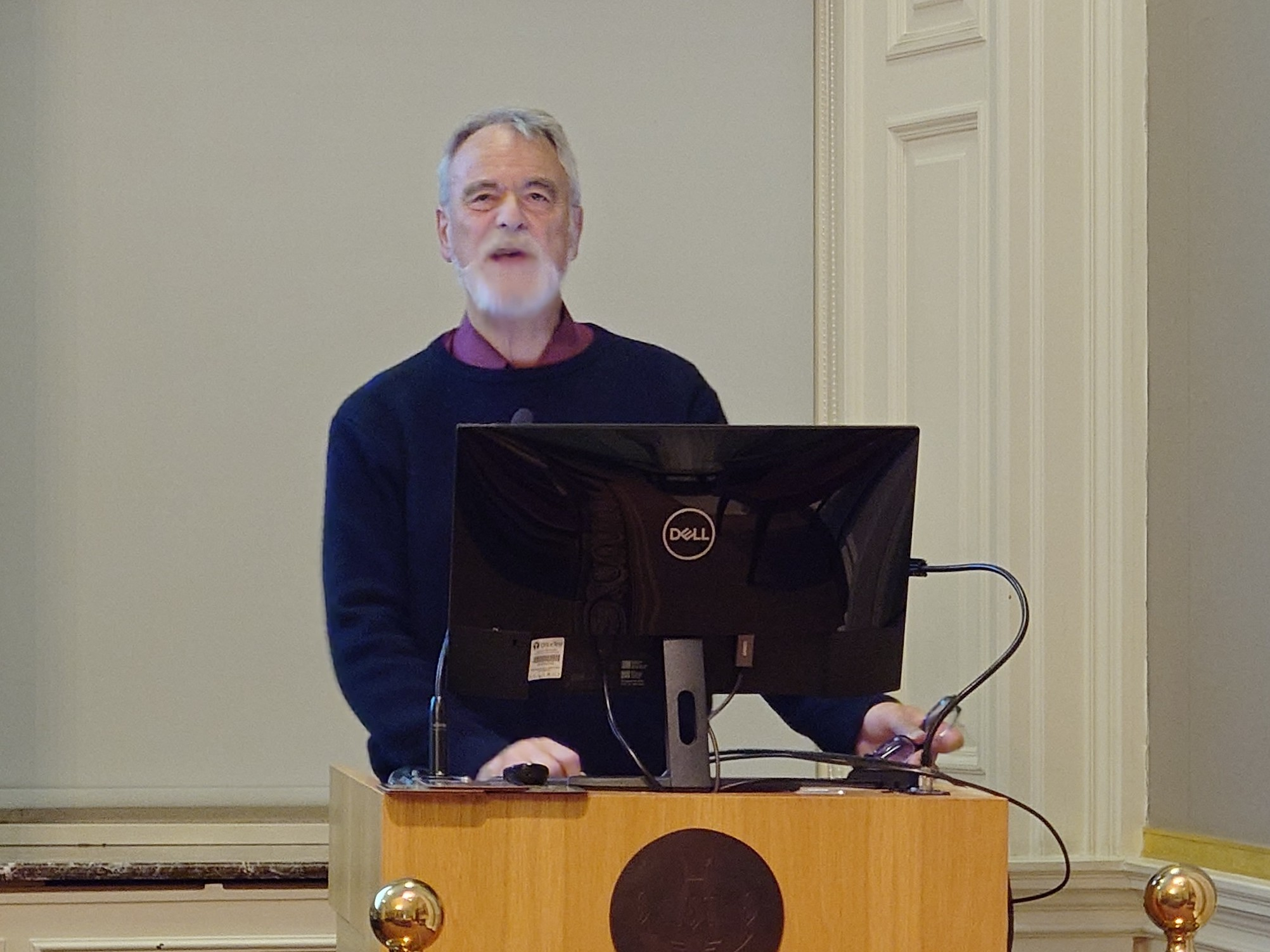
- Born: 18 November 1946 (age 79); Hampshire, England
- Title: Professor of Archaeology
- Spouse: Katherine Bowden (m. 1976)

Academic background
- Education: Portsmouth Grammar School; University of Oxford

Academic work
- Discipline: Archaeology
- Sub-discipline: Prehistoric Europe; Prehistoric art; Landscape archaeology
- Institutions: University of Reading
- Doctoral students: David Mullin

Richard John Bradley, FSA, FSA Scot, FBA (born 18 November 1946) is a British archaeologist and academic specialising in European prehistory, particularly Prehistoric Britain. From 1987 to 2013, he was Professor of Archaeology at the University of Reading, where he is now emeritus professor. Bradley has published extensively on European prehistory and prehistoric Britain.

== Early life and education ==
Bradley was born on November 18, 1946 in Hampshire, England. His father was a metallurgist in the British Navy.

He was educated at Portsmouth Grammar School, then an all-boys direct grant grammar school in Portsmouth. It was at school where he first became interested in archaeology. He later went on to study law at Magdalen College, Oxford, and graduated from the University of Oxford with a Bachelor of Arts (BA) degree; and as per tradition, his BA was later promoted to a Master of Arts (MA Oxon) degree.

== Archaeological career ==
He chose to pursue archaeology rather than law, beginning as an amateur fieldworker and publishing papers in national journals despite having no formal qualifications in the discipline. At 25, he was appointed assistant lecturer at Reading University. Later, he was promoted to Lecturer (1971–1984), Reader (1984–1987), and Professor of Archaeology (1987–2013).

By 1996, British Archaeology magazine described Bradley as one of the most respected archaeologists in his field. He retired from full-time academia in 2013 and was appointed emeritus professor.

== Personal life ==
In 1976, Bradley married Katherine Bowden, a history teacher by profession. They do not have any children.

== Honours ==
Bradley was elected a Fellow of the Society of Antiquaries of London (FSA) on January 13, 1977. He became a Fellow of the British Academy (FBA), the United Kingdom's national academy for the humanities and social sciences, in 1995. The British Academy awarded him the Grahame Clark Medal in 2006, and the following year he was elected an honorary Fellow of the Society of Antiquaries of Scotland (Hon. FSAScot).

== Selected works ==
=== Monographs ===
Title	Co-author(s)	Year	Publisher	ISBN
Mesolithic Assemblage from East Sussex		1972	Phillimore & Co Ltd.	ISBN 978-0850330755
The Prehistoric Settlement of Britain		1978	Routledge (London)	ISBN 978-0710089939
The Social Foundations of Prehistoric Britain		1984	Longman (Harlow)	ISBN 978-0582491649
Passage of Arms: An Archaeological Analysis of Prehistoric Hoards and Votive Deposits		1990	Cambridge University Press (Cambridge)	ISBN 978-1900188586
Interpreting the Axe Trade: Production and Exchange in Neolithic Britain	Mark Edmonds	1993	Cambridge University Press	ISBN 978-0521434461
Altering the Earth: Origins of Monuments in Britain and Continental Europe		1993	Society of Antiquaries of Scotland	ISBN 978-0903903080
Rock Art and the Prehistory of Atlantic Europe: Signing the Land		1997	Routledge (London)	ISBN 978-0415165365
The Significance of Monuments: On the Shaping of Human Experience in Neolithic and Bronze Age Europe		1998	Routledge (London)	ISBN 978-0415152044
Passage of Arms: An Archaeological Analysis of Prehistoric Hoards and Votive Deposits		1998	Oxbow Books	ISBN 978-1900188586
An Archaeology of Natural Places		2000	Routledge (London)	ISBN 978-0415221504
The Good Stones: A New Investigation of the Clava Cairns	Colleen Batey	2000	Society of Antiquaries of Scotland	ISBN 978-0903903172
The Past in Prehistoric Societies		2002	Routledge (London)	ISBN 978-0415276283
Ritual and Domestic Life in Prehistoric Europe		2005	Routledge (Abingdon)	ISBN 978-0415345507
The Moon and the Bonfire: An Investigation of Three Stone Circles in NE Scotland	Sharon Arrowsmith	2005	Society of Antiquaries of Scotland	ISBN 978-0903903332
The Prehistory of Britain and Ireland (Cambridge World Archaeology)		2007	Cambridge University Press (New York)	ISBN 978-0521612708
Image and Audience: Rethinking Prehistoric Art		2009	Oxford University Press (New York)	ISBN 978-0199533855
The Idea of Order: The Circular Archetype in Prehistoric Europe		2012	Oxford University Press (New York)	ISBN 978-0199608096
A Geography of Offerings: Deposits of Valuables in the Landscapes of Ancient Europe: 3 (Oxbow Insights in Archaeology)		2016	Oxbow Books	ISBN 978-1785704796
A Comparative Study of Rock Art in Later Prehistoric Europe (Elements in the Archaeology of Europe)		2020	Cambridge University Press	ISBN 978-1108885638
Temporary Palaces: The Great House in European Prehistory (Oxbow Insights in Archaeology Book 7)		2021	Oxbow Books	ISBN 978-1789256611
Maritime Archaeology on Dry Land: Special Sites along the Coasts of Britain and Ireland from the First Farmers to the Atlantic Bronze Age		2022	Oxbow Books	ISBN 978-1789258196
Monumental Times: Pasts, Presents, and Futures in the Prehistoric Construction Projects of Northern and Western Europe		2024	Oxbow Books	ISBN 979-8888570395
Insularity and Identity: Prehistoric Britain and the Archaeology of Europe (Elements in the Archaeology of Europe)		2025	Cambridge University Press	ISBN 978-1009557818

=== Edited Volumes ===
Title	Co-editor(s)	Year	Publisher	ISBN
Sentient Archaeologies: Global Perspectives on Places, Objects and Practice	Courtney Nimura, Rebecca O'Sullivan	2023	Oxbow Books	ISBN 978-1789259322

== See also ==
- Tomnaverie Stone Circle
