= Priddy Circles =

Archaeological site in Priddy, Somerset, England

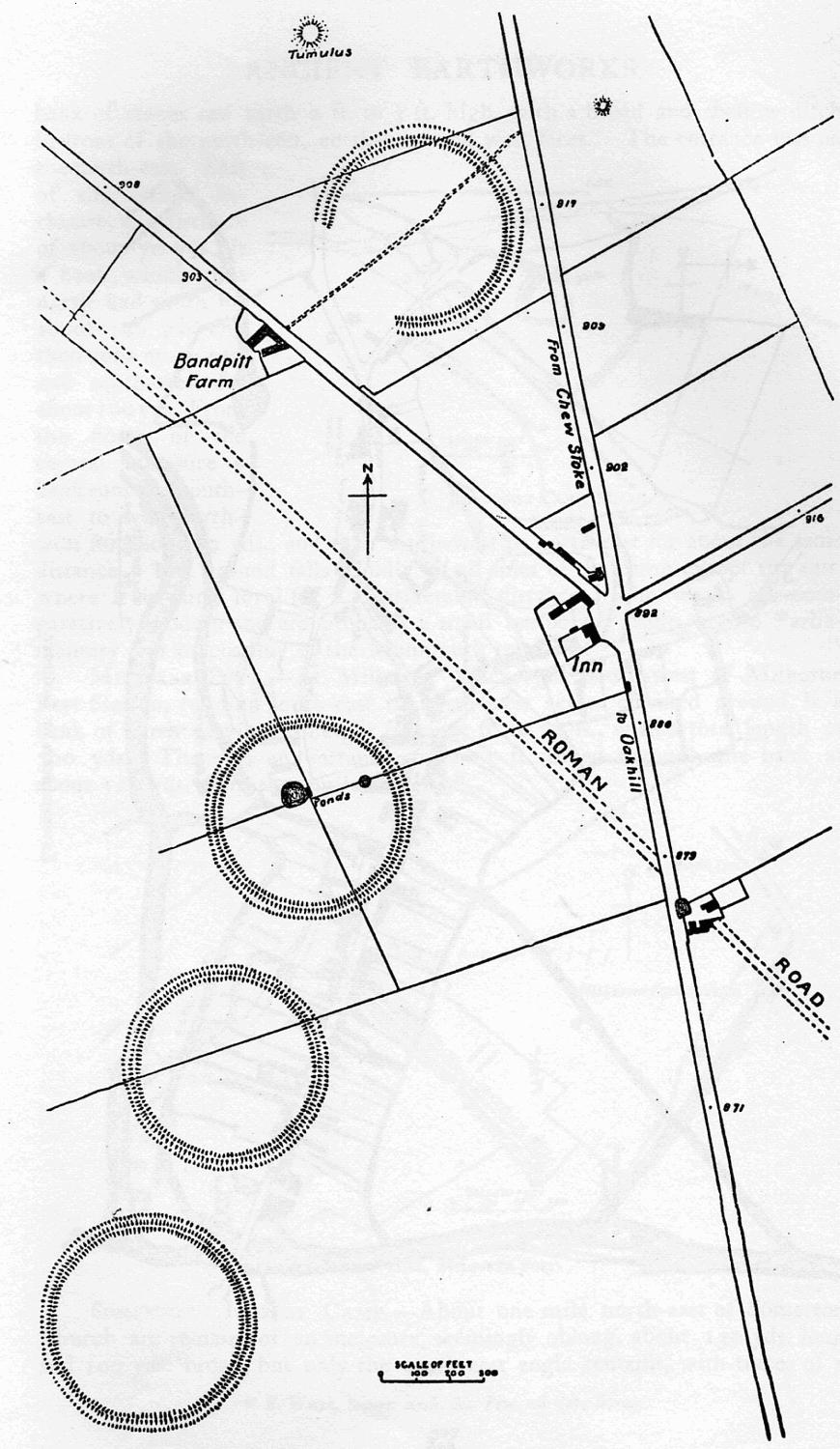
- Interactive map of Priddy Circles
- 51°16′20.93″N 2°39′38.85″W
- Type: Earthwork enclosures
- Periods: Neolithic
- Location: near Priddy and Wells
- Region: Somerset, England

Site notes
- Condition: ruined

Priddy Circles are a linear arrangement of four circular earthwork enclosures near the village of Priddy on the Mendip Hills in Somerset, England. The circles have been listed as Scheduled Ancient Monuments, and described as 'probable Neolithic ritual or ceremonial monuments similar to a henge'.

The southernmost Priddy Circle falls on adjoining land to a house and stables that are owned by retired businessman Roger Penny. In 2012 Penny was fined £10,000 after the earthwork was damaged by work he had permitted.

== Description ==
The enclosures range in diameter from 185 to 194 m (607 to 636 ft). Three of the circles are closely spaced in a nearly straight line, while the fourth is 350 m (1,150 ft) to the north and somewhat out of line with the other three. The total arrangement is spread over roughly 1.2 km (0.75 miles). There is no missing enclosure in the gap between the northernmost enclosure and the others. This gap is bisected by the B3135 road and the course of the Roman road which runs between Charterhouse and Old Sarum.

The four circles each consist of a flat circular area surrounded by a bank and external ditch enclosure with more than one entrance. Excavations carried out between 1956 and 1959 by members of the University of Bristol Spelæological Society showed that the banks had stone cores with post and stake holes on either side. Geophysical surveys in 1995 and a magnetometer survey in 2006 are exploring further the make up of the circles.

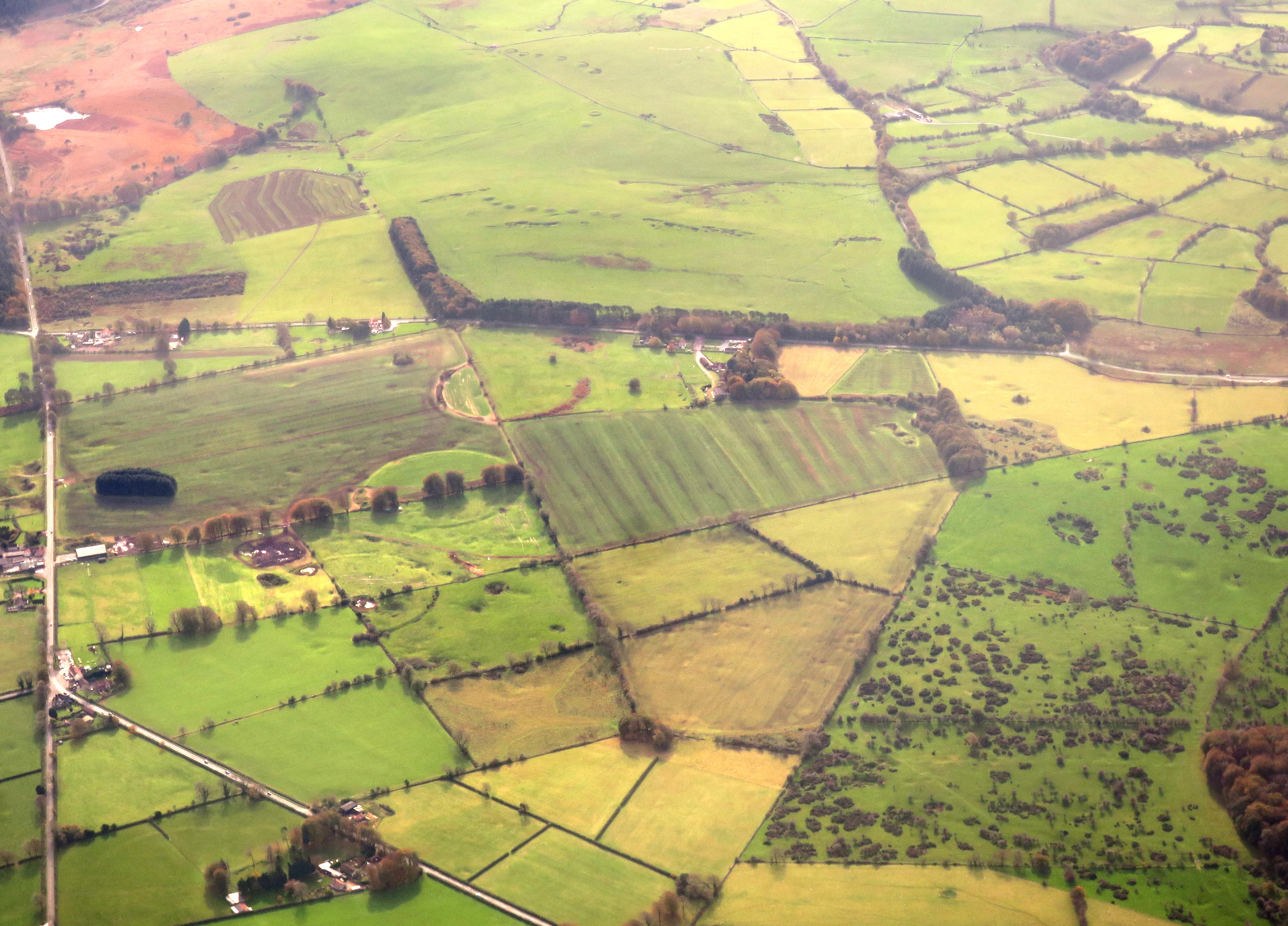
Aerial view of Priddy Circles, with the Priddy Nine Barrows and Ashen Hill Barrow Cemeteries in the distance.

The circles are numbered in sequence 1 to 4, with number 1 being the most southerly of the group. Circle 1 is 194 m (636 ft) in diameter, with a surviving ditch up to 6 m (20 ft) wide and 1.2 m (3 ft 11 in) deep. It has several gaps, but the one to the north-north-east was a causewayed entrance feature. Circle 2 is 185 m (607 ft) in diameter, with a bank up to 6 m wide and 1 m (3 ft 3 in) high, and the ditch is up to 0.5 m (1 ft 8 in) deep. There are three gaps present in this earthwork, and the one to the north-north-east is possibly an original feature. Within circle 2 is a possible ovoid barrow mound measuring 14 by 9 m (46 by 30 ft), and 0.4 m (1 ft 4 in) high. Circle 3 is up to 190 m (620 ft) across, with a bank up to 1 m high and 7 m (23 ft) wide, and ditch up to 1 m deep and 5 m (16 ft) wide. There are four gaps in this circle, the one to the south-south-west is considered an original entrance feature because it directly faces the north-north-west entrance of circle 2. Circle 4 has a diameter of up to 190 m but only two-thirds of the earthwork is present. Boreholes made in the 1950s suggested that the missing western section was never finished, possibly due to subsidence in the area. Associated with circle 4 is a group of mounds interpreted as barrows, one outside the circle to the west, and possibly four inside.

== 2011 damage ==
In June 2011, it was reported that English Heritage was investigating damage to the site, and during July 2011 photographs were published that appear to show significant damage to a section of the southernmost circle.

The owner of the southernmost ring, Roger Penny, was fined £10,000 and ordered to restore the earthwork at a cost of £38,000 following the damage caused by contractors he had hired.

Rubble had been used to fill important “swallet” holes in the ring, these have been described as natural cavities which may have been key to the monument’s creation. The workers also cleared gorse and bracken between April and October 2011, bringing rubble into the field to help rebuild a wall and moving a gate. In bringing in the rubble, ruts were made in the ground inside the circle by agricultural machinery. The damage included the destruction of a circular ditch said to be completely bulldozed. Penny was aware the ring was a scheduled monument and told the contractors not to touch it, but because part of the site is not visible to the naked eye "serious damage" was caused. English Heritage had not been consulted about the works. A spokeswoman for English Heritage described the damage as a "major incident", adding the structure was one of only about 80 henges in England. She said the loss of the fabric to the henge meant a "really, really rare piece of Neolithic engineering had been lost forever".

== Interpretation ==
They are probably Neolithic ritual or ceremonial monuments similar to a henge but this interpretation is somewhat speculative due to the presence of external rather than internal ditches, a feature which makes them unique in Britain.

Although no dating evidence has been found, they appear to be contemporary with Stonehenge, i.e. Neolithic circa 2500 BC - 2180 BC. Two round barrow cemeteries, Ashen Hill and Priddy Nine-Barrows, located less than 1 km (0.62 miles) south of the Circles, would seem to imply that the area to the northeast of Priddy held ritual significance into the Bronze Age.
