= Bres (disambiguation) =

Bres was a mythic Irish king of the Tuatha Dé Danann. Bres may also refer to:

- Bres Rí, legendary Irish High King
- Guido de Bres (1522–1567), Walloon pastor, Protestant reformer and theologian
- Klaudia Breś (born 1994), Polish sport shooter
- Madeleine Brès (1842–1921), first French woman to obtain a medical degree
- Małgorzata Breś (born 1959), Polish fencer
- Bres., taxonomic author abbreviation of Giacomo Bresadola (1847–1929), Italian mycologist

== See also ==
- Saint-Brès (disambiguation), name or part of the name of several communes in France
- Brees (surname)
- Bress, a surname
