= Callanish (Europa) =

Multi-ring crater on Europa

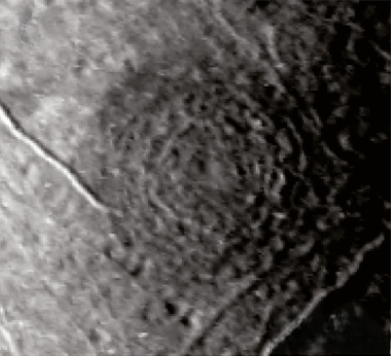
- A mosaic image of Callanish, taken by the Galileo space probe on 25 November 1999.
- Feature type: Multiring Crater
- Coordinates: 16.70°S 334.50°W
- Diameter: 107 km (66 mi)
- Eponym: Callanish Stones

Callanish is a large, multi-ring impact crater structure on Europa, the smallest of Jupiter's four Galilean moons.

== Naming ==
Callanish is named after a circle of megalithic standing stones on the Island of Lewis in the western islands of Scotland. The Callanish Stones are associated with traditional Celtic mythology and beliefs, although their exact purpose remains a mystery.

The International Astronomical Union (IAU) stipulated that all surface features and craters on Europa should be named after figures and places that are either related to the mythological princess Europa or from Celtic mythology. Callanish belongs to the latter category.

The name was approved by the IAU in 1997.

== Location ==
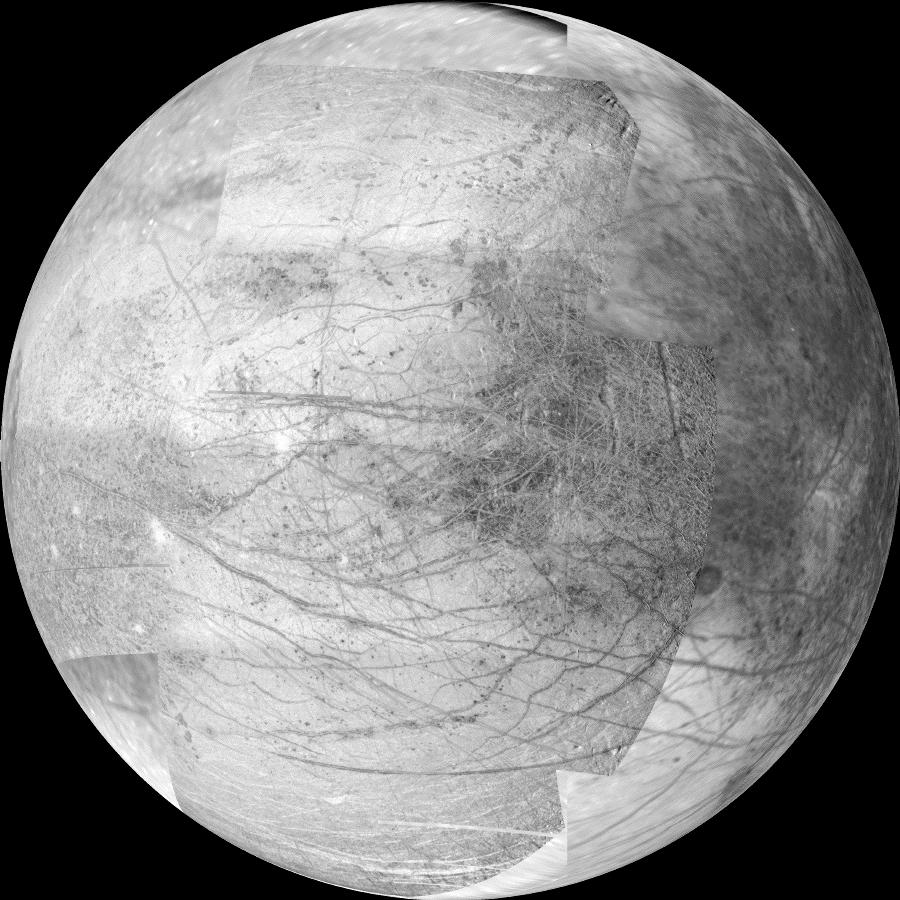
A global image of Europa's Jupiter-facing side, showing Callanish, the circular, dark spot at the bottom-right, taken by Galileo in November 1999.

Callanish is located a few hundred kilometers south of the equator of Europa. Like many of Europa's other features, Callanish is surrounded on all sides by several crisscrossing linea terrains such as Hyperenor Linea and Phineus Linea. To the north of Callanish is the extensive Annwn Regio and the crater Midir, while to the south is Govannan.

Callanish is located within the Callanish quadrangle (or section) of Europa's surface. (designated Je10). The quadrangle is named after its most prominent feature, Callanish.

Like all major moons in the Solar System, Europa orbits Jupiter in synchronous rotation, in which one hemisphere of Europa always faces Jupiter, while the other side never does. Callanish is located on the hemisphere of Europa that always faces Jupiter. Therefore, an observer standing on Callanish would always see Jupiter in the same place in the sky at all times. (Note: For moons in synchronous rotation, such as Europa, 0° longitude corresponds to the part of the surface that always faces Jupiter. Regions between 90° W to 180° W to 270° W longitude never face the moon's parent planet.)

== Morphology ==
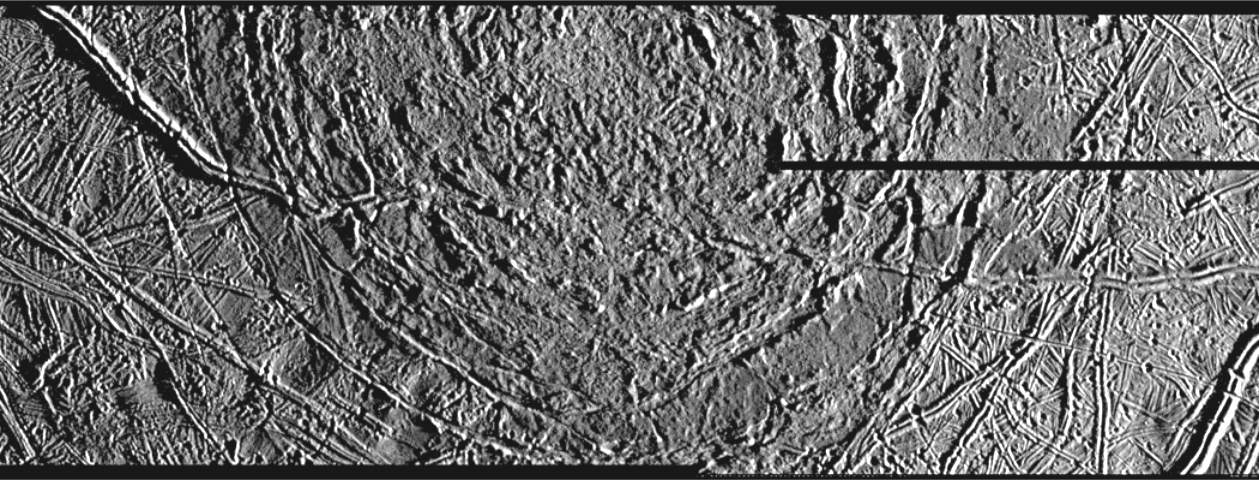
A very high resolution image of the southern part of Callanish crater, taken by Galileo in December 1996.

Callanish is described as an impact crater structure with a multi-ring morphology. However, it differs from “classical” craters in that it possesses disrupted terrain in annular zones and a flat interior, rather than a sharp crater bowl. The structure of Callanish's morphology is anomalous compared to typical solid-water ice craters like Pwyll, implying the presence of weak or mobile material beneath the crater floor of Callanish. For a time, scientists debated whether or not Callanish was an impact crater.

Morphologically, Callanish can be divided into two primary zones along with several associated features. The inner zone, approximately 50 km (31 mi) in diameter, has a rugged-textured surface (the rough inner unit on maps). Near the center lies a 10–15 km feature of slightly higher albedo, composed of radially arranged lobes surrounding a central depressed annulus (the bright central lobate unit on maps). Across the boundary between the two zones are elongate, concentric massifs.

The zone surrounding the central rough area (the smoother outer flow unit on maps) consists of small, finely textured, equidimensional hills, except where disrupted by subsequent tectonic activity. The outer zone is distinctly darker and redder than the inner zone. Its material appears to pond in low areas and was likely emplaced in a fluidized state, possibly as a slurry. This zone is intersected by several large, concentric troughs (800 m (2,600 ft) wide), smaller troughs, and numerous fractures. Simple troughs merge into a complex, multiple-terrace trough up to ~4 km (2.5 mi) km wide along the southeast periphery of Callanish. The troughs are interpreted as tectonic features, possibly graben. Crosscutting relationships indicate that most deposits predate the formation of these tectonic structures, although some of the outer zone material may have remained mobile after trough formation, suggesting the troughs formed shortly after the impact rather than during it.

Just outside Callanish to the southwest lie two undulating depressions approximately 10 km (6.2 mi) across. Two prominent ridges intersect the structure, one from the west-northwest and the other from the east-southeast. Both are modified in the outer zone and terminate at the inner boundary, indicating they either predate Callanish or were influenced by its formation. Numerous small pits, often with raised rims, surround Callanish; some form radially oriented chains, interpreted as secondary impact craters. The presence of these secondary craters confirms Callanish as an impact feature.

Photoclinometric topography, verified with shadow measurements, shows Callanish to be regionally flat. Low-sun imaging minimized photometric effects, allowing surface shape to strongly control shading. The photoclinometric method of Kirk (1987) was used, iterating between a shaded model and the actual scene until convergence. No present-day depression is associated with the feature. Maximum relief across high-spatial-frequency components is ~100 m (330 ft), except for large concentric massifs, which reach ~200 m (660 ft). Concentric troughs are ~100 m (330 ft) m deep, with surfaces ramping gradually several kilometers outside the troughs to reliefs exceeding 50 m (160 ft) m at the rims. These raised rims may complement the downwarping observed along the flanks of steep-sided ridges near Callanish and elsewhere on Europa.

== Formation ==
As mentioned, Callanish's unusual structure implies it formed over mechanically weak material. The weak substrate is interpreted as a fluid layer of warm water ice, ice slurries or possibly even liquid water. This suggests Europa's brittle ice shell was thin at the time, around 10 km (6.2 mi) to 15 km (9.3 mi), allowing deformation during impact.

Instead, Callanish more closely resembles a similar structure called Tyre, located on the opposite side of Europa. Both Tyre and Callanish exhibit flat topography, concentric rings, and annular massifs. These traits are inconsistent with an impact into a purely solid, brittle ice shell like those seen on the few other craters elsewhere on Europa and other icy moons.

The existence of Callanish strongly suggests that Europa's crust is multi-layered and continuously evolving, meaning near the surface of Europa, its crust can behave like solid ice which is solid but brittle, but at depths of several kilometers below the ice shell, the crust can behave plastically or fluidly.

== Implications for Europa's Ice Shell ==
Using the largest possible diameter estimate for Callanish, the maximum depth from which ejecta can originate is only 3.6 km. This strongly implies that the dark, red material observed around some Europan craters originates from only a few kilometers below the moon's surface.

Callanish serves as a key comparative analog for other large Europan impact structures, particularly Tyre. Similarities in size, internal structure, and surface morphology between Callanish and Tyre have been used to argue that both features formed through the same general process involving interaction between a brittle surface ice layer and a weak or fluid substrate beneath. As such, Callanish provides important evidence for vertical mechanical stratification within Europa's ice shell and for the presence of warm or partially molten material at depth during the moon's recent geological past.

== Exploration ==
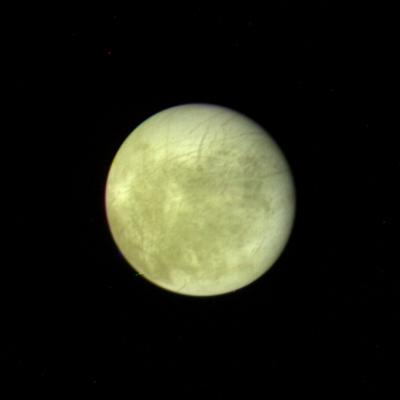
A distance image of Europa, taken by Voyager 1 during its closest approach in March 1979. Callanish is the dark spot slightly above the center of the image. North is down in this image.

Voyager 1 and Voyager 2 both explored Europa during their flybys of Jupiter in March 1979 and July 1979, respectively. However, only Voyager 1 imaged the hemisphere of Europa that always faces Jupiter, while Voyager 2 photographed only the opposite hemisphere. Voyager 1 became the first probe to observe Callanish, but its images were of low resolution because the spacecraft was more than 730,000 km (450,000 mi) away from Europa during its closest approach.

Galileo was the first probe to capture high-resolution images of Callanish as it orbited Jupiter between December 1995 and September 2003. A close flyby of Europa (E4 flyby) in December 1996 allowed Galileo to image Callanish at a very high resolution of 120 m (390 ft) per pixel. In November 1999, Galileo imaged Callanish again along much of Europa's Jupiter-facing hemisphere at a resolution of 955 m (3,133 ft) per pixel. As of 2026, Galileo's imagery remains the clearest available of Callanish, with an average resolution of 955 m (3,133 ft) per pixel and a maximum resolution of 120 m (390 ft) per pixel.

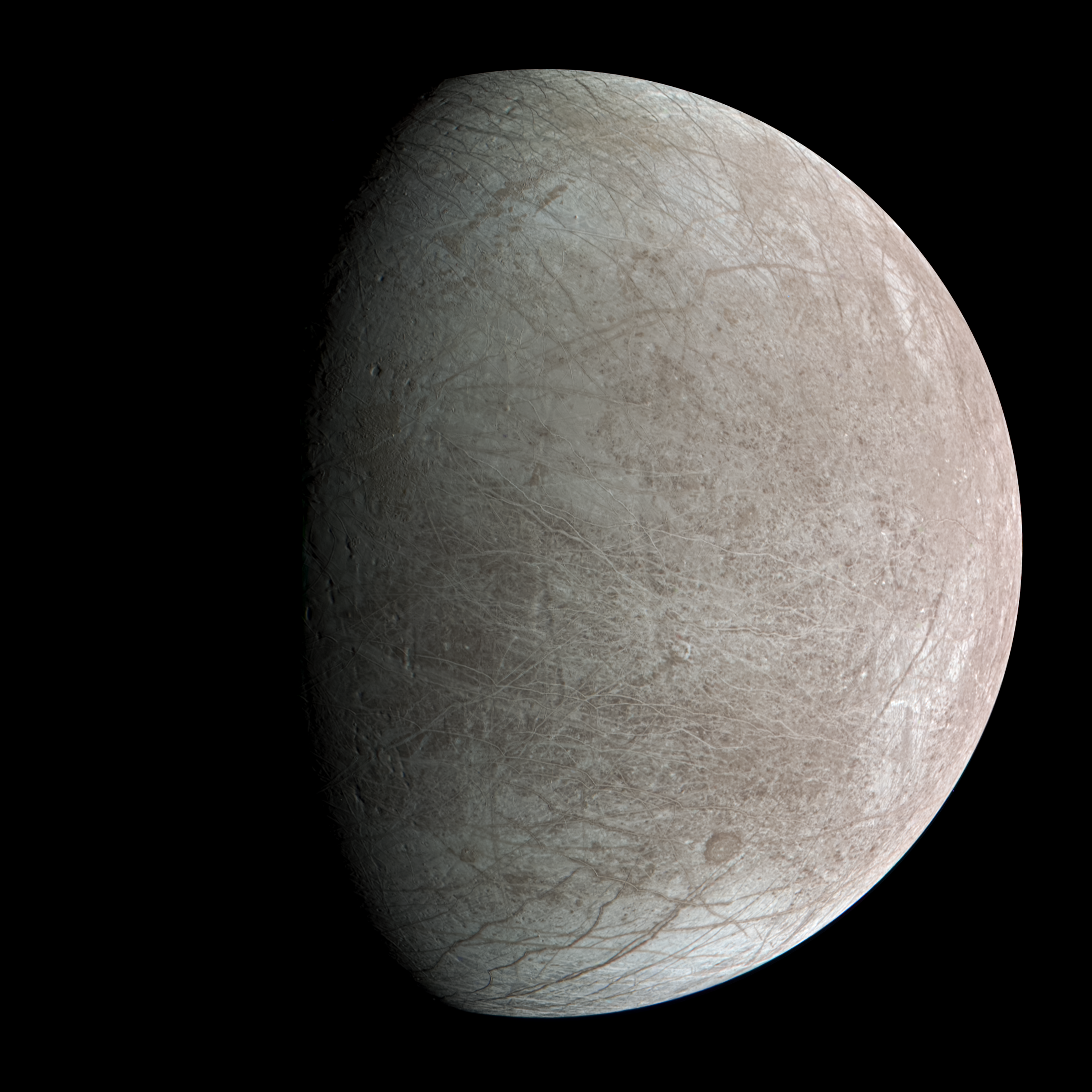
An image of Europa in true color, taken by Juno in September 2022. Callanish is the colored spot on the bottom part of the moon.

In September 2022, the Juno space probe visited Europa during its 45th perijove (i.e. closest approach to Jupiter). During this flyby, Juno imaged the Jupiter-facing side of Europa in true color and at high resolution. Callanish appeared as a distinctive oval spot in Juno's imagery.

=== Future Missions ===
Two space probes are currently en route to Europa. The first is NASA's Europa Clipper mission, which is scheduled to arrive at Jupiter in April 2030. The spacecraft will orbit Jupiter on a trajectory that allows it to conduct at least 49 close flybys of Europa, approaching to within 25 km (16 mi) of the moon's surface. Europa Clipper carries an ice-penetrating radar capable of probing Europa's ice shell, enabling investigations of both the surface features of Callanish and the subsurface structure beneath the crater. This information will provide planetary scientists with insights into the composition of Europa's subsurface and the response of its ice shell to meteoroid impacts.

The second probe is European Space Agency's (ESA) Jupiter Icy Moons Explorer (Juice), which will arrive at Jupiter in July 2031. Juice will fly by Europa only twice, but it will help supplement the data collected by Europa Clipper.

== See also ==
- List of geological features on Europa
- List of quadrangles on Europa
- List of craters on Europa
- List of lineae on Europa
