= Annwn Regio =

Region on Europa

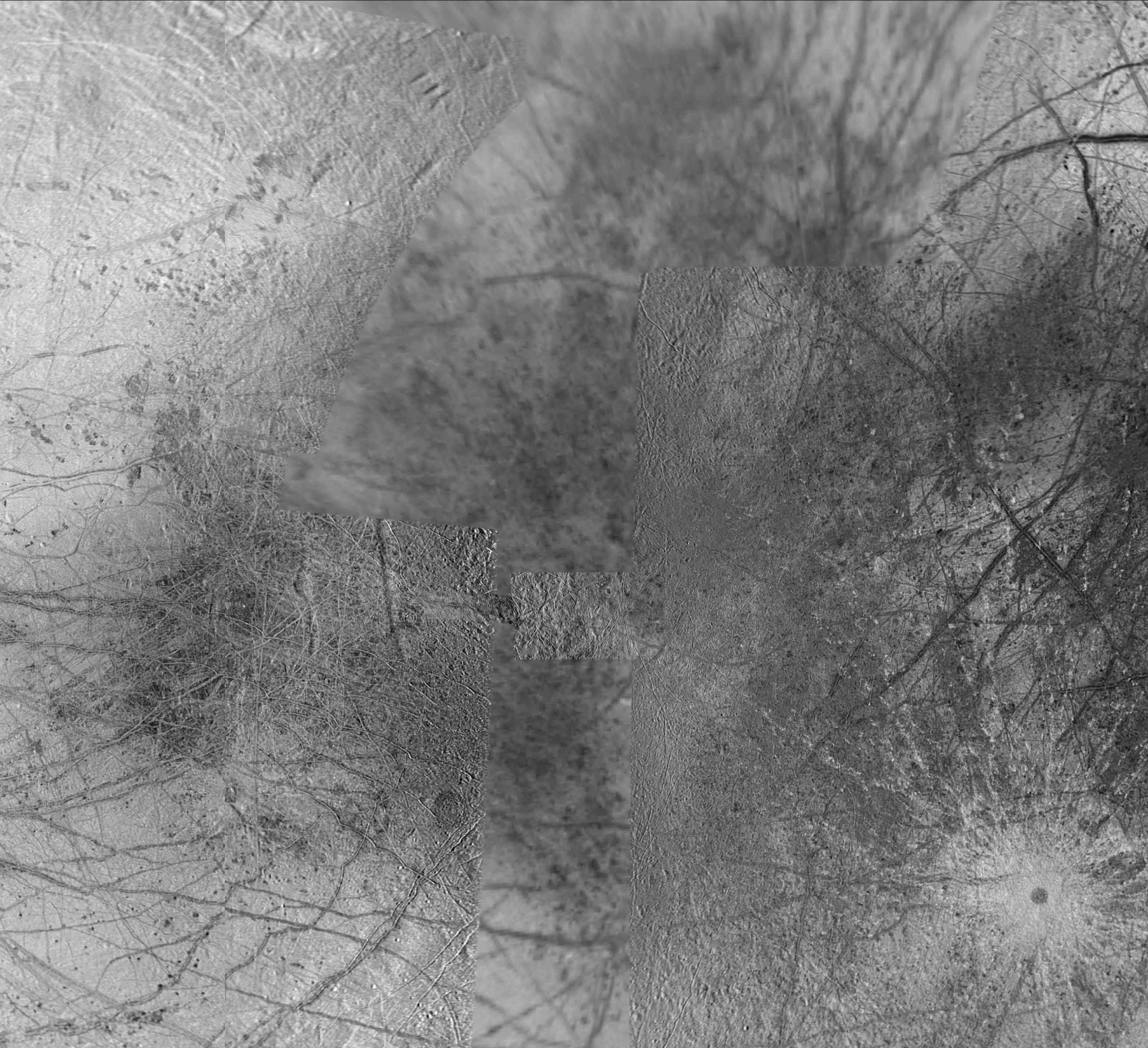
- A Mercator projection map of Annwn Regio. The dark area to the right is Dyfed Regio, while the ray crater to the lower right is Pwyll.
- Feature type: Regio
- Coordinates: 20°N 320°W
- Length: 2,300 kilometres (1,400 mi) (irregularly shaped)
- Eponym: Annwn

Annwn Regio is an extensive, relatively dark surface feature on Jupiter's fourth largest moon Europa. It is an irregular feature dominated by several crisscrossing lineae (or line terrain).

== Naming ==
Annwn Regio is named after the Otherworld in Welsh mythology. According to the most widely accepted version of Welsh mythology, Annwn is the land of the gods and souls of the blessed dead, a place where there are no suffering or diseases, and where food and alcohol are always abundant.

The International Astronomical Union (IAU) chose this name following the rule that surface features on Europa should be named after figures and places associated with either Celtic mythology or the Phoenician princess Europa from whom the moon was named after. Annwn is a spiritual place derived from Welsh mythology, and Welsh mythology is part of the broader Celtic mythology. The name for Annwn Regio was approved by the IAU in May 2007.

== Location ==
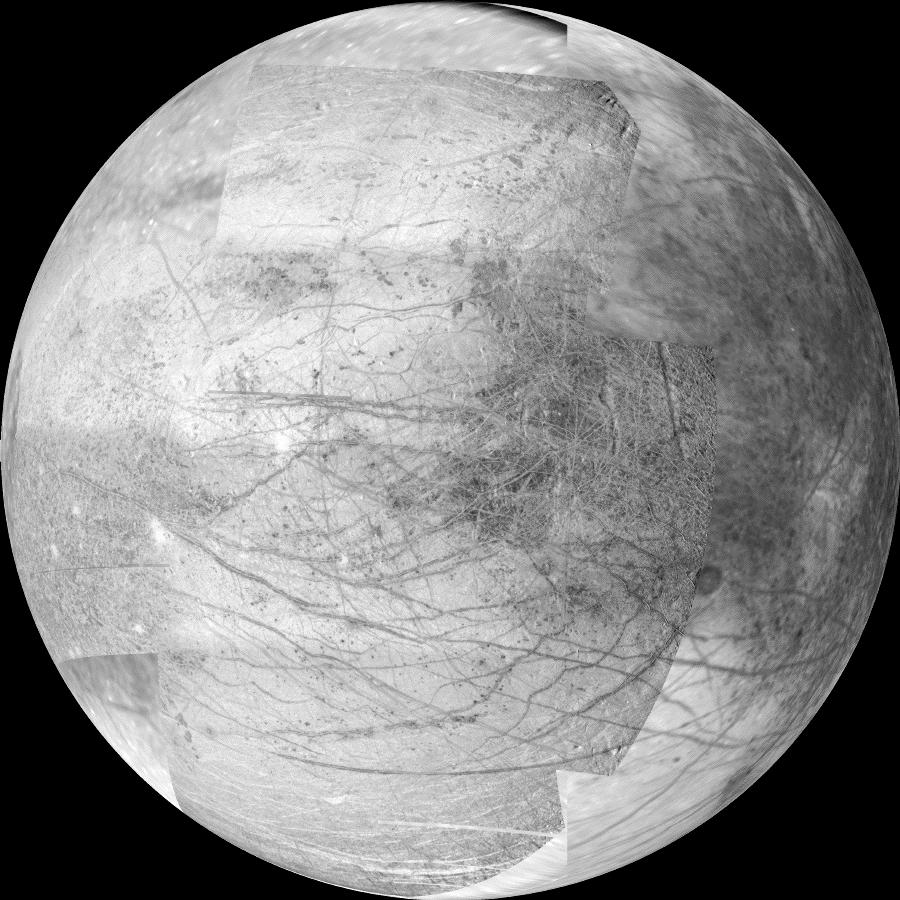
A global image of Europa's Jupiter-facing side, taken by Galileo in November 1999. Annwn Regio is the dark areas on the right side of Europa in this image.

Annwn Regio is a massive, relatively dark region occupying much of the trailing hemisphere of Europa.

To the northeast of Annwn Regio is the extensive bright region called Falga Regio, while to the east is another dark region crater called Dryfed Regio. To the southeast the prominent ray crater Pwyll is situated, while to the south is the multi-ring structure Callanish. To the west of Annwn Regio is another regio called Tara Regio.

Annwn Regio occupies much of the Annwn Regio quadrangle (designated Je5) and the Callanish quadrangle (designated Je10) of Europa. However, due to the regio's extensive surface area, Annwn also intrudes into adjacent quadrangles, including the Murias Chaos, Rhadamanthys Linea, Euphemius Linea, Castalia Macula and Pwyll quadrangles (Je2, Je4, Je6, Je9 and Je14 respectively).

Annwn Regio is situated on the side of Europa that permanently faces Jupiter, as Europa rotates synchronously while it orbits its parent planet. Consequentially, an observer standing on Annwn Regio would always see Jupiter in the sky in the same place at all times. Only at the easternmost section of Annwn Regio will an observer see Jupiter sink below the horizon. (Note: For moons in synchronous rotation, such as Europa, 0° longitude corresponds to the part of the surface that always faces Jupiter. Regions between 90° W, 0° and 270° W longitude perpetually face the moon's parent planet.)

== Geology ==
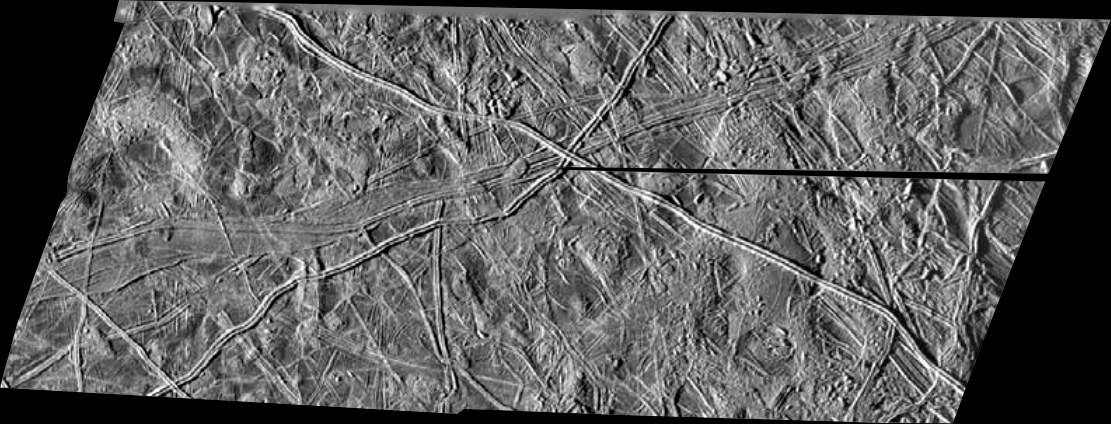
A close up image of the central part of Annwn Regio, showing its chaotic terrain, taken by Galileo in December 1996.

Annwn Regio is a rugged plain that is largely stained by several dark chaos terrains and dark bands (formally called lineae). Much of its surface is disrupted by irregular units of chaos terrains produced by tectonic activity. It is generally believed that the driving force behind Europa's tectonic activity is the immense pull of Jupiter's powerful gravitational field. In addition, Europa's nearby sibling moons, Io and Ganymede, also exert their own gravitational influences on Europa, increasing the internal energy that drives the moon's tectonic processes.

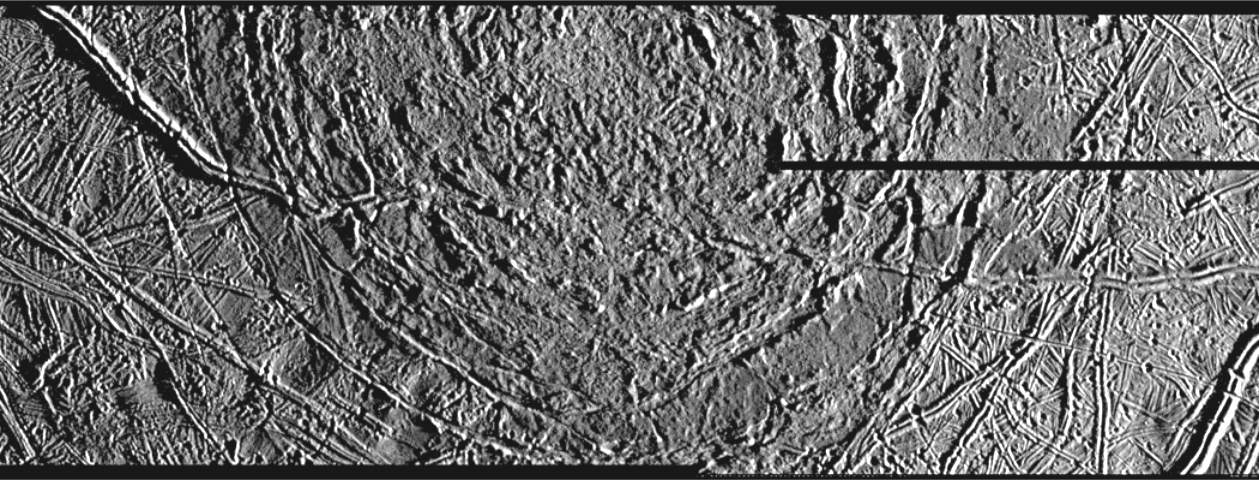
An image of Callanish crater within the southern boundary of Annwn Regio.

Annwn Regio is populated by a handful of unusual craters. The most notable is Callanish, a multi-ring crater that is believed to have formed in a different way from most other craters on Europa and other icy moons in the Solar System. Callanish is thought to have formed when an asteroid or comet struck a thin, mechanically weak section of the moon's icy crust underlain by a viscous fluid layer, causing the crater's interior floor to be flat rather than bowl-shaped as is typical of most impact craters.

Another feature is the surface depression Midir, which has an unusual shape, and it may or may not be an impact crater. Two prominent lineae called Hyperenor Linea and Chthonius Linea cut across the southern section of Annwn Regio. The bright rays of the crater Pwyll from the southeast are spilling over into Annwn Regio. forming a distinctive contrast between the darker region and the bright, fresh ice excavated by Pwyll.

As of 2026, the northern part of Annwn Regio is still poorly mapped.

== Exploration ==
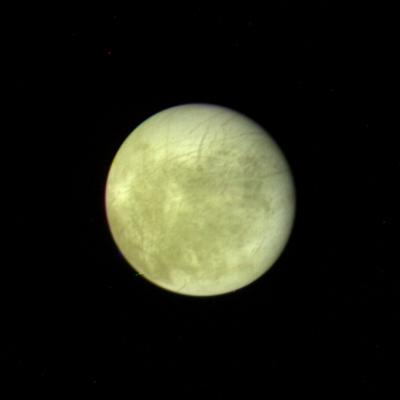
A distance image of Europa as a full disk, taken by Voyager 1 in March 1979. The image is centered at Annwn Regio. North is down in this image.

Voyager 1 was the first probe to image the Jupiter-facing side of Europa during its flybys in March and July 1979. However, Voyager 1 was 1,840,000 km (1,140,000 mi) from Europa when viewing conditions for Annwn Regio were most favorable; and during its closest approach to Europa, at 730,000 km (450,000 mi), most of Annwn Regio was on the dark side of the moon.

Voyager 2 imaged the opposite side of Europa during its closest approach to the moon in July 1979. Consequentially, it was not able to image Annwn Regio and Europa's trailing hemisphere.

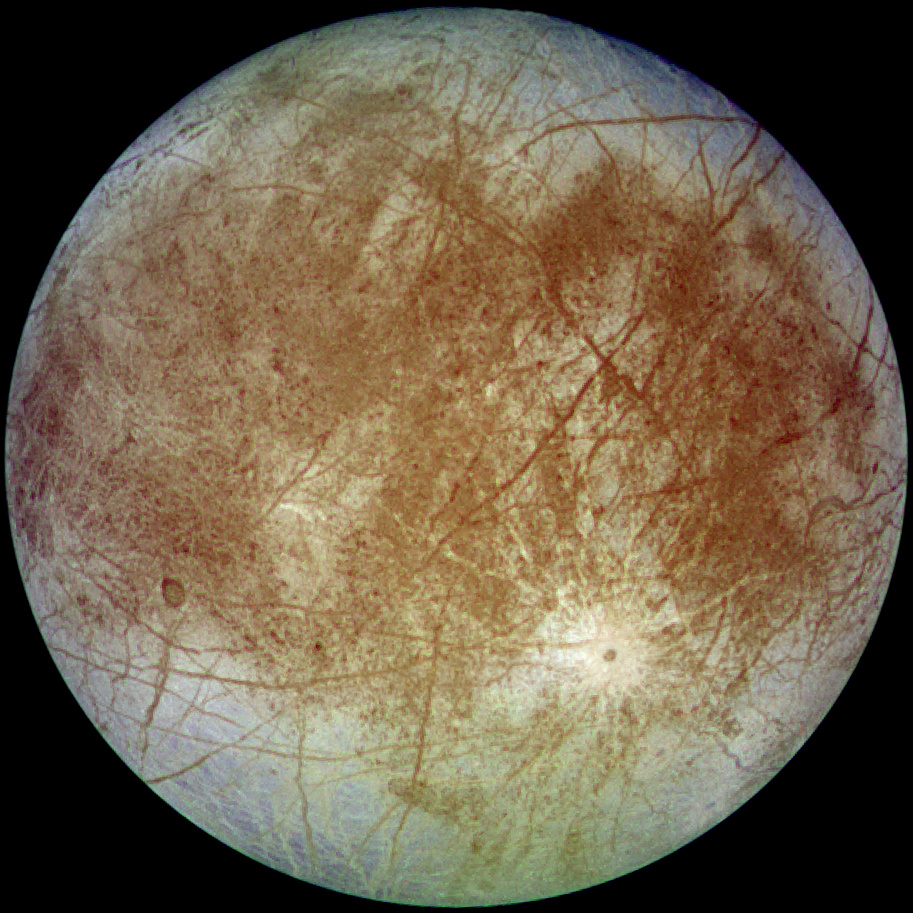
An orthographic, enhanced-color image of Europa, showing Annwn Regio, the dark region occupying most of the left side of the moon. This image was taken by Galileo in September 1996. The dark oval on the bottom left of the moon is the multi-ring structure called Callanish, while the bright crater to the lower right is Pwyll

Galileo was the first spacecraft to obtain high-resolution images of Falga Regio while orbiting Jupiter from December 1995 to September 2003, providing the highest-resolution images of the regio available to date. It achieved resolutions as fine as 25 metres (82 ft) per pixel, clearly revealing details of the regio's chaotic terrain. It also obtained more detailed global images of Europa, with much higher resolution than those captured by Voyager 1.

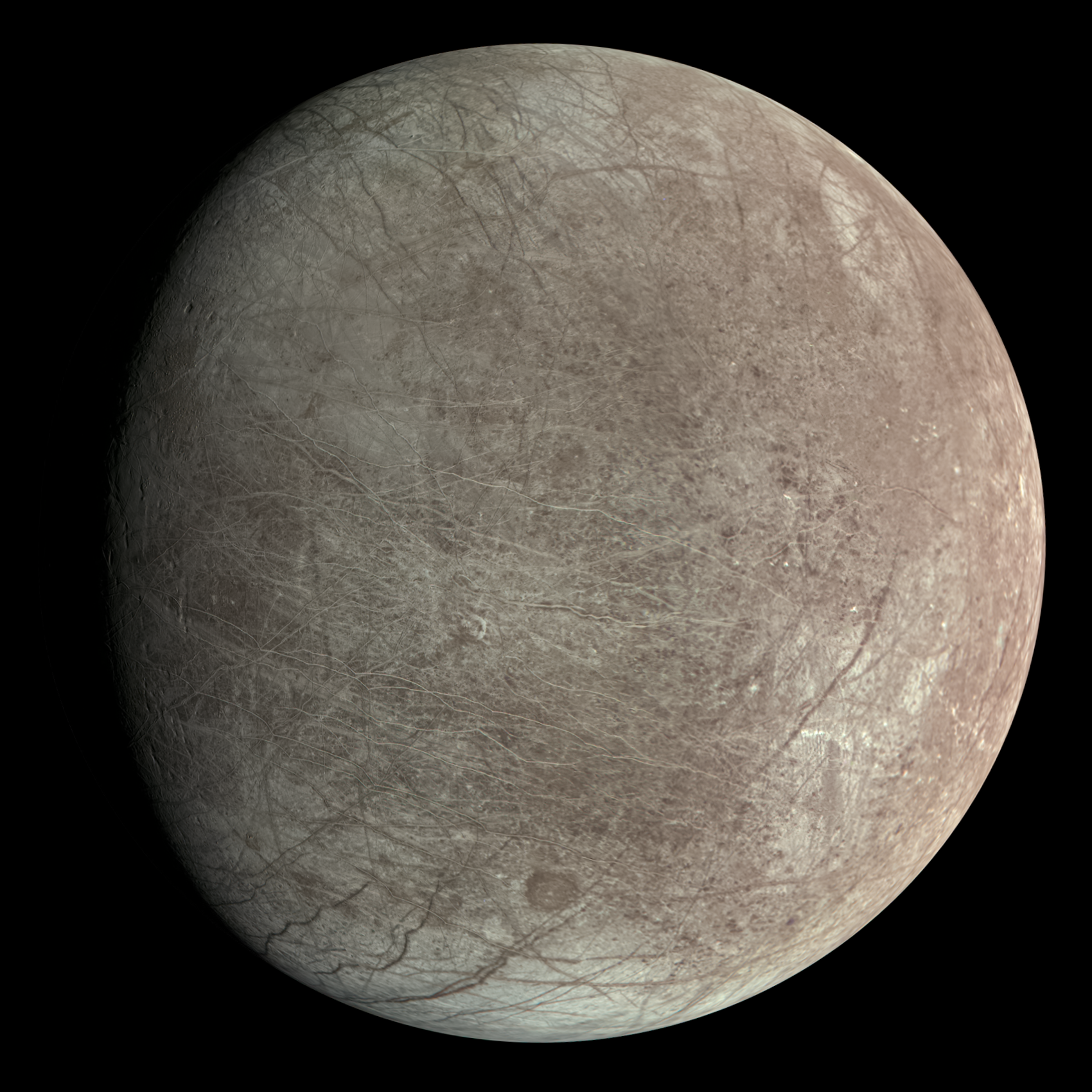
A true color image of Europa, centered on Annwn Regio, taken in September 2022 by the Juno space probe. The oval spot at the bottom is Callanish.

The most recent mission to visit Europa was Juno, which flew by the moon during its 54th perijove (closest approach to Jupiter) while orbiting Jupiter. The spacecraft produced some of the best images of Europa and Annwn Regio to date, as Juno's closest approach to Europa occurred over Annwn Regio.

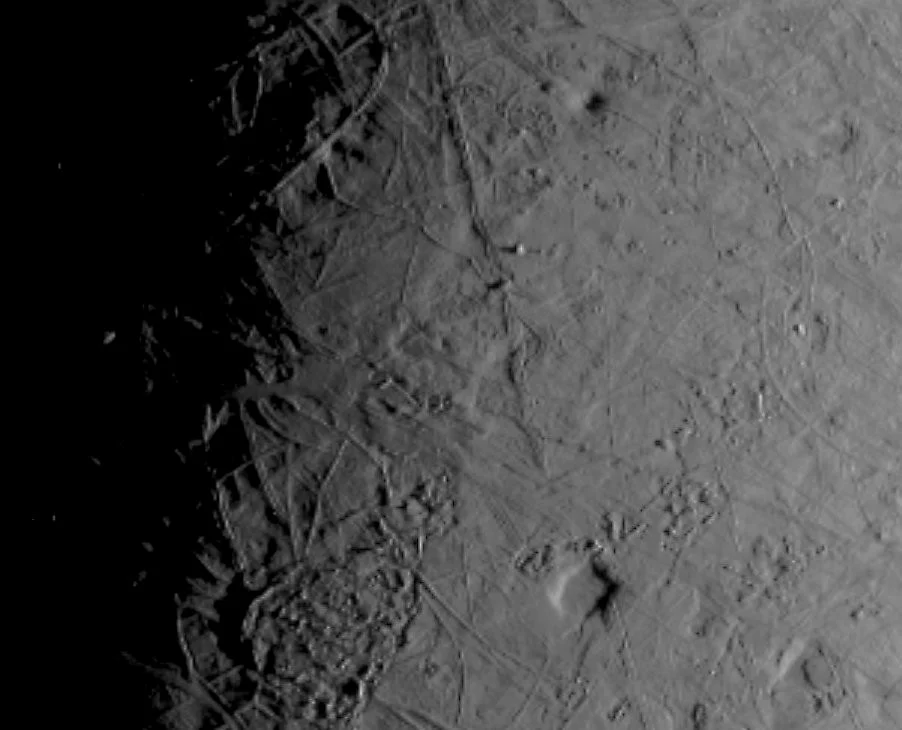
A very close-up image of Europa, taken by Juno, revealing the ruggedness of the western side of Annwn Regio.

In addition, although Europa appears as a smooth, solid-ice sphere from a distance, Juno's high-resolution images, combined with processing by citizen scientists, have revealed the bumps and textures on the moon's surface.

=== Future Missions ===
Two space probes are currently en route to Europa. The first is NASA's Europa Clipper mission, launched in October 2024 and expected to reach Jupiter in April 2030. It will orbit Jupiter along a trajectory that enables at least 49 flybys of Europa, with the closest approaches coming within 25 km (16 mi) of the moon's surface. The spacecraft is equipped with an ice-penetrating radar capable of probing Europa’s ice shell, allowing Europa Clipper to study the subsurface structure beneath the cracks of Annwn Regio.

The second probe is the European Space Agency's Jupiter Icy Moons Explorer (Juice), launched in April 2023 and expected to reach Jupiter in July 2031. Juice will fly by Europa only twice, as its primary focus is on Ganymede and Callisto. Nevertheless, the data gathered by Juice will complement the observations made by Europa Clipper.

== See also ==
- List of geological features on Europa
