= List of craters on Europa =

Impact craters discernible on Jupiter's moon Europa.

The surface of Jupiter's moon Europa is very young geologically speaking, and as a result there are few evidences of impact crater at its surface. Moreover, as the surface of Europa is theorised as being composed of a weak water ice shell extending over an underlying liquid ocean, most surviving craters are considered likely to have slumped, such that their structure will be very low in relief and hard to detect. Most of the craters on Europa large enough to have been discerned are named after prominent figures in Celtic myths and folklore.

== List ==
| Crater | Coordinates | Diameter (km) | Approval Year | Eponym | Ref |
|---|---|---|---|---|---|
| Áine | 43°S 177.5°W | 5 | 2000 | Áine, Celtic goddess of love and beauty | WGPSN |
| Amaethon | 13.82°N 177.47°W | 1.7 | 2006 | Amaethon, Celtic god of agriculture | WGPSN |
| Amergin | 14.7°S 129.4°E | 17 | 2000 | Amergin, legendary Irish druid and poet | WGPSN |
| Angus | 12.6°S 75.1°W | 4.5 | 2000 | Angus, beautiful Celtic god of love | WGPSN |
| Avagddu | 1.4°N 169.5°W | 10 | 2000 | Avagddu, Celtic storm deity | WGPSN |
| Balor | 52.8°S 97.8°W | 4.8 | 2000 | Balor, Celtic god of the night | WGPSN |
| Bress | 37.64°N 98.66°W | 10 | 2006 | Bress, beautiful son of Elatha in Celtic mythology | WGPSN |
| Brigid | 10.8°N 81.3°W | 9.5 | 2000 | Brigid, Celtic goddess of healing, smiths, fertility, and poetry | WGPSN |
| Camulus | 26.5°S 81.1°W | 4.5 | 2000 | Camulus, Gaelic war god | WGPSN |
| Cilix | 2.6°N 178.1°E | 15 | 1985 | Cilix, brother of Europa | WGPSN |
| Cliodhna | 2.5°S 76.4°W | 3 | 2000 | Cliodhna, Celtic goddess of beauty | WGPSN |
| Cormac | 36.9°S 88.1°W | 4 | 2000 | Cormac mac Airt, High King of Ulster in Irish myths | WGPSN |
| Dagda | 37.35°N 168.74°W | 9.8 | 2006 | Dagda, one of the chief deities of the Tuatha de Danann in Irish mythology | WGPSN |
| Deirdre | 65.4°S 152.7°E | 4.5 | 2000 | Deirdre, the most beautiful woman in Irish myths | WGPSN |
| Diarmuid | 61.3°S 102°W | 8.2 | 2000 | Diarmuid Ua Duibhne, handsome Irish mythological warrior, and husband of Gráinne | WGPSN |
| Dylan | 55.3°S 84.4°W | 5.3 | 2000 | Dylan Eil Ton, Celtic sea god | WGPSN |
| Elathan | 31.9°S 79.8°W | 2.5 | 2000 | Elathan, handsome Celtic king, and father of sun god Bres | WGPSN |
| Eochaid | 50.48°S 233.33°W | 10.6 | 2006 | Eochaid, King of the Fir Bolgs in Celtic mythology | WGPSN |
| Govannan | 37.3°S 57.2°E | 11.5 | 1997 | Govannan, one of the children of Don, a smith and a brewer | WGPSN |
| Gráinne | 59.7°S 99.4°W | 13.5 | 2000 | Gráinne, daughter of Cormac Mac Art, and wife of Diarmuid | WGPSN |
| Gwern | 9.14°N 344.54°W | 22.2 | 2006 | Gwern, son of Branwen in Celtic mythology | WGPSN |
| Gwydion | 60.5°S 81.6°W | 5 | 2000 | Gwydion, Celtic poet and one of the children of Don | WGPSN |
| Llyr | 1.8°S 138.2°E | 1.1 | 2000 | Llyr, Celtic sea god | WGPSN |
| Luchtar | 40.2°S 257.57°W | 19.9 | 2006 | Luchtar, Celtic god of carpentry | WGPSN |
| Lug | 27.99°N 44.31°W | 11 | 2006 | Lug, Irish omnicompetent god | WGPSN |
| Mael Dúin | 16.8°S 162.1°E | 2 | 2000 | Máel Dúin, Celtic hero | WGPSN |
| Maeve | 58.8°N 78.9°W | 21.3 | 2000 | Maeve, mythological Irish queen of Connacht province | WGPSN |
| Manannán | 3.1°N 120.3°E | 30 | 1997 | Manannán mac Lir, Irish sea and fertility god | WGPSN |
| Math | 25.6°S 176.3°E | 10.8 | 2000 | Math ap Mathonwy, Celtic god of wealth and treasure | WGPSN |
| Midir | 3.65°N 338.75°W | 37.4 | 2006 | Midir, Celtic fate and underworld deity | WGPSN |
| Morvran | 4.9°S 152.6°W | 15 | 1985 | Morvran, Celtic ugly son of Tegid | WGPSN |
| Niamh | 21.1°N 143.1°E | 5 | 2000 | Niamh, golden-haired daughter of Mannanán | WGPSN |
| Ogma | 87.45°N 287.86°W | 5 | 2006 | Ogma, Celtic god of eloquence and literature, son of Dagda | WGPSN |
| Oisín | 52.3°S 146.6°E | 6.2 | 2000 | Oísin, mythical Irish warrior, son of Fionn Mac Cumhail and Sadb | WGPSN |
| Pryderi | 66.1°S 159.1°W | 1.7 | 2000 | Pryderi, son of Pwyll | WGPSN |
| Pwyll | 25.2°S 88.6°E | 45 | 1997 | Pwyll, Celtic god of the underworld | WGPSN |
| Rhiannon | 80.9°S 165.1°E | 15.9 | 1985 | Rhiannon, Celtic heroine | WGPSN |
| Taliesin | 22.8°S 138°W | 50 | 1985 | Taliesin Celtic magician, son of Bran | WGPSN |
| Tegid | 0.8°N 164.4°W | 29.7 | 1985 | Tegid Veol, Celtic hero who lived in Bula Lake | WGPSN |
| Tuag | 59.92°N 172.36°W | 15.2 | 2006 | Tuag, Irish dawn goddess | WGPSN |
| Uaithne | 48.5°S 90.7°W | 6.5 | 2000 | Uaithne, the harpist for Dagda | WGPSN |

back to top
