= Europa (moon) =

Smallest Galilean moon of Jupiter

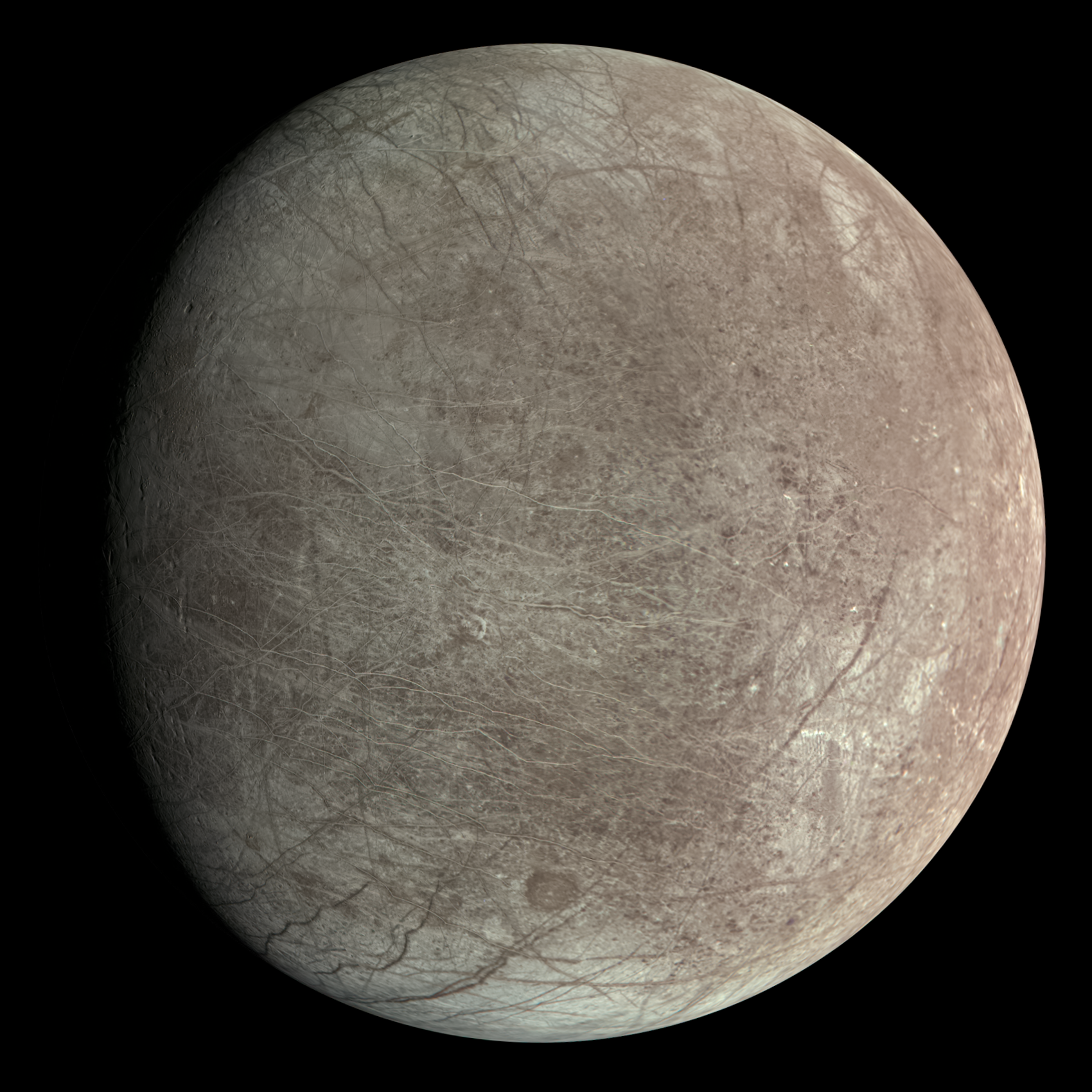
- Europa, as imaged by the Juno spacecraft, September 2022. Numerous dark lineae criss-cross its geologically young surface. (Note: The dark-colored oval spot at the lower portion of the image is Callanish.)

Discovery
- Discovered by: Galileo Galilei; Simon Marius
- Discovery date: 8 January 1610

Designations
- Pronunciation: /jʊˈroʊpə/
- Named after: Ευρώπη Eurōpē
- Alternative names: Jupiter II
- Adjectives: Europan /jʊˈroʊpən/

Orbital characteristics
- Epoch 8 January 2004
- Periapsis: 664862 km (Note: Periapsis is derived from the semimajor axis (a) and eccentricity (e): a(1 − e).)
- Apoapsis: 676938 km (Note: Apoapsis is derived from the semimajor axis (a) and eccentricity (e): a(1 + e).)
- Mean orbit radius: 670900 km
- Eccentricity: 0.009
- Orbital period (sidereal): 3.551181 d
- Average orbital speed: 13743.36 m/s
- Inclination: 0.470° (to Jupiter's equator); 1.791° (to the ecliptic)
- Satellite of: Jupiter

Physical characteristics
- Dimensions: 3125.2 × 3120.6 × 3119.0 km
- Mean radius: 1560.8±0.3 km (0.245 Earths)
- Surface area: 3.061×10^{7} km^{2} (0.061 Earths) (Note: Surface area derived from the radius (r): 4πr^{2}.)
- Volume: 1.593×10^{10} km^{3} (0.015 Earths) (Note: Volume derived from the radius (r): ^{4}/_{3}πr^{3}.)
- Mass: 4.79984×10^{22} kg (0.008 Earths)
- Mean density: 3.013±0.005 g/cm^{3} (0.546 Earths)
- Surface gravity: 1.314 m/s^{2} (0.134 g) (Note: Surface gravity derived from the mass (m), the gravitational constant (G) and the radius (r): Gm/r^{2}.)
- Moment of inertia factor: 0.3547±0.0024
- Escape velocity: 2.025 km/s (Note: Escape velocity derived from the mass (m), the gravitational constant (G) and the radius (r): $\textstyle\sqrt{2Gm/r}$.)
- Synodic rotation period: Synchronous
- Axial tilt: 0.1° (to Jupiter)
- North pole right ascension: 268.08°
- North pole declination: 64.51°
- Albedo: 0.72–0.62 (geometric) (Note: For the leading and trailing hemispheres respectively.); 0.67–0.59 (Bond)
| Surface temp. | min | mean | max |
|---|---|---|---|
| Surface | ≈ 50 K | 102 K (−171 °C) | 125 K |
- Apparent magnitude: 5.29 (opposition)

Atmosphere
- Surface pressure: 0.1 μPa (10^{−12} bar)

Europa (/jʊˈroʊpə/), or Jupiter II, is the smallest and least massive of Jupiter's four Galilean moons. It is observable from Earth with common binoculars and is a planetary-mass moon, slightly smaller and less massive than Earth's Moon. Europa is an icy moon, and, of the three icy Galilean moons, the closest orbiting Jupiter. As a result, it exhibits a relatively young surface shaped by tidal heating.

Europa consists mainly of silicate rock, and potentially has an iron-nickel core. It has a very thin atmosphere composed primarily of oxygen. Europa has a pale, geologically young surface striated by light tan cracks and streaks; the surface lacks large-scale features such as mountains or craters, making the moon the smoothest known solid object in the Solar System. The apparent youth and smoothness of the surface is due to a water ocean beneath the surface, which could conceivably harbor extraterrestrial life. The predominant model suggests that heat from tidal flexing causes the ocean to remain liquid and drives ice movement similar to plate tectonics, absorbing chemicals from the surface into the ocean below.

Sea salt from a subsurface ocean may be coating some geological features on Europa, suggesting that the ocean is interacting with the sea floor. This may be important in determining whether Europa could be habitable. In addition, the Hubble Space Telescope detected water vapor plumes similar to those observed on Saturn's moon Enceladus, which are thought to be caused by erupting cryogeysers. In May 2018, astronomers provided supporting evidence of water plume activity on Europa, based on an updated analysis of data obtained from the Galileo space probe, which orbited Jupiter from 1995 to 2003. Such plume activity could help researchers in a search for life from the subsurface Europan ocean without having to land on the moon. In March 2024, astronomers reported that the surface of Europa may have much less oxygen than previously inferred.

Europa was discovered independently by Simon Marius and Galileo Galilei. Marius later named it after Europa, the Phoenician mother of King Minos of Crete and lover of Zeus (the Greek equivalent of the Roman Jupiter). In addition to Earth-bound telescope observations, Europa has been examined by a succession of space-probe flybys, the first occurring in the early 1970s. The Galileo mission, launched in 1989, provides the bulk of current data on Europa. No spacecraft has yet landed on Europa, although there have been several proposed exploration missions. In September 2022, the Juno spacecraft flew within around 320km (200 miles) of Europa for a more recent close-up view. The European Space Agency's Jupiter Icy Moons Explorer (Juice) is a mission to Ganymede launched on 14 April 2023, that will include two flybys of Europa. NASA's Europa Clipper was launched on 14 October 2024.

== Discovery and naming ==
Europa, along with Jupiter's three other large moons, Io, Ganymede, and Callisto, was discovered by Galileo Galilei on 8 January 1610, and possibly independently by Simon Marius. On 7 January, Galileo had observed Io and Europa together using a 20×-magnification refracting telescope at the University of Padua, but the low resolution could not separate the two objects. The following night, he saw Io and Europa for the first time as separate bodies.

The moon is the namesake of Europa, in Greek mythology the daughter of the Phoenician king of Tyre. Like all the Galilean satellites, Europa is named after a lover of Zeus, the Greek counterpart of Jupiter. Europa was courted by Zeus and became the queen of Crete. The naming scheme was suggested by Simon Marius, who attributed the proposal to Johannes Kepler:

Jupiter is much blamed by the poets on account of his irregular loves. Three maidens are especially mentioned as having been clandestinely courted by Jupiter with success. Io, daughter of the River Inachus, Callisto of Lycaon, Europa of Agenor. Then there was Ganymede, the handsome son of King Tros, whom Jupiter, having taken the form of an eagle, transported to heaven on his back, as poets fabulously tell... I think, therefore, that I shall not have done amiss if the First is called by me Io, the Second Europa, the Third, on account of its majesty of light, Ganymede, the Fourth Callisto...

The names fell out of favor for a considerable time and were not revived in general use until the mid-20th century. In much of the earlier astronomical literature, Europa is simply referred to by its Roman numeral designation as Jupiter II (a system also introduced by Galileo) or as the "second satellite of Jupiter". In 1892, the discovery of Amalthea, whose orbit lay closer to Jupiter than those of the Galilean moons, pushed Europa to the third position. The Voyager probes discovered three more inner satellites in 1979, so Europa is now counted as Jupiter's sixth satellite, though it is still referred to as Jupiter II. The adjectival form has stabilized as Europan.

Planetary moons other than Earth's were never given symbols in the astronomical literature. Denis Moskowitz, a software engineer who designed most of the dwarf planet symbols, proposed a Greek epsilon (the initial of Europa) combined with the cross-bar of the Jupiter symbol as the symbol of Europa. This symbol is not widely used.

== Orbit and rotation ==
Animation of the Laplace resonance of Io, Europa and Ganymede (conjunctions are highlighted by color changes)

Plot of vertical position y vs time t of the animation above

Europa orbits Jupiter in roughly 3.55 days, with an orbital radius of about 670,900 km. With an orbital eccentricity of only 0.009, the orbit itself is nearly circular, and the orbital inclination relative to Jupiter's equatorial plane is small, at 0.470°. Like its fellow Galilean satellites, Europa is tidally locked to Jupiter, with one hemisphere of Europa constantly facing Jupiter. Because of this, there is a sub-Jovian point on Europa's surface, from which Jupiter would appear to hang directly overhead. Europa's prime meridian is a line passing through this point. Research suggests that tidal locking may not be full, as a non-synchronous rotation has been proposed: Europa spins faster than it orbits, or at least did so in the past. This suggests an asymmetry in internal mass distribution and that a layer of subsurface liquid separates the icy crust from the rocky interior.

The slight eccentricity of Europa's orbit, maintained by gravitational disturbances from the other Galileans, causes Europa's sub-Jovian point to oscillate around a mean position. As Europa comes slightly nearer to Jupiter, Jupiter's gravitational attraction increases, causing Europa to elongate towards and away from it. As Europa moves slightly away from Jupiter, Jupiter's gravitational force decreases, causing Europa to relax back into a more spherical shape, and creating tides in its ocean. The orbital eccentricity of Europa is continuously pumped by its mean-motion resonance with Io. Thus, the tidal flexing kneads Europa's interior and gives it a source of heat, possibly allowing its ocean to stay liquid while driving subsurface geological processes. The ultimate source of this energy is Jupiter's rotation, which is tapped by Io through the tides it raises on Jupiter and is transferred to Europa and Ganymede by the orbital resonance.

Analysis of the unique cracks lining Europa yielded evidence that it likely spun around a tilted axis at some point in time. If correct, this would explain many of Europa's features. Europa's immense network of crisscrossing cracks serves as a record of the stresses caused by massive tides in its global ocean. Europa's tilt could influence calculations of how much of its history is recorded in its frozen shell, how much heat is generated by tides in its ocean, and even how long the ocean has been liquid. Its ice layer must stretch to accommodate these changes. When there is too much stress, it cracks. A tilt in Europa's axis could suggest that its cracks may be much more recent than previously thought. The reason for this is that the direction of the spin pole may change by as much as a few degrees per day, completing one precession period over several months. A tilt could also affect estimates of the age of Europa's ocean. Tidal forces are thought to generate the heat that keeps Europa's ocean liquid, and a tilt in the spin axis would cause more heat to be generated by tidal forces. Such additional heat would have allowed the ocean to remain liquid for a longer time. However, it has not yet been determined when this hypothesized shift in the spin axis might have occurred.

== Bulk properties ==
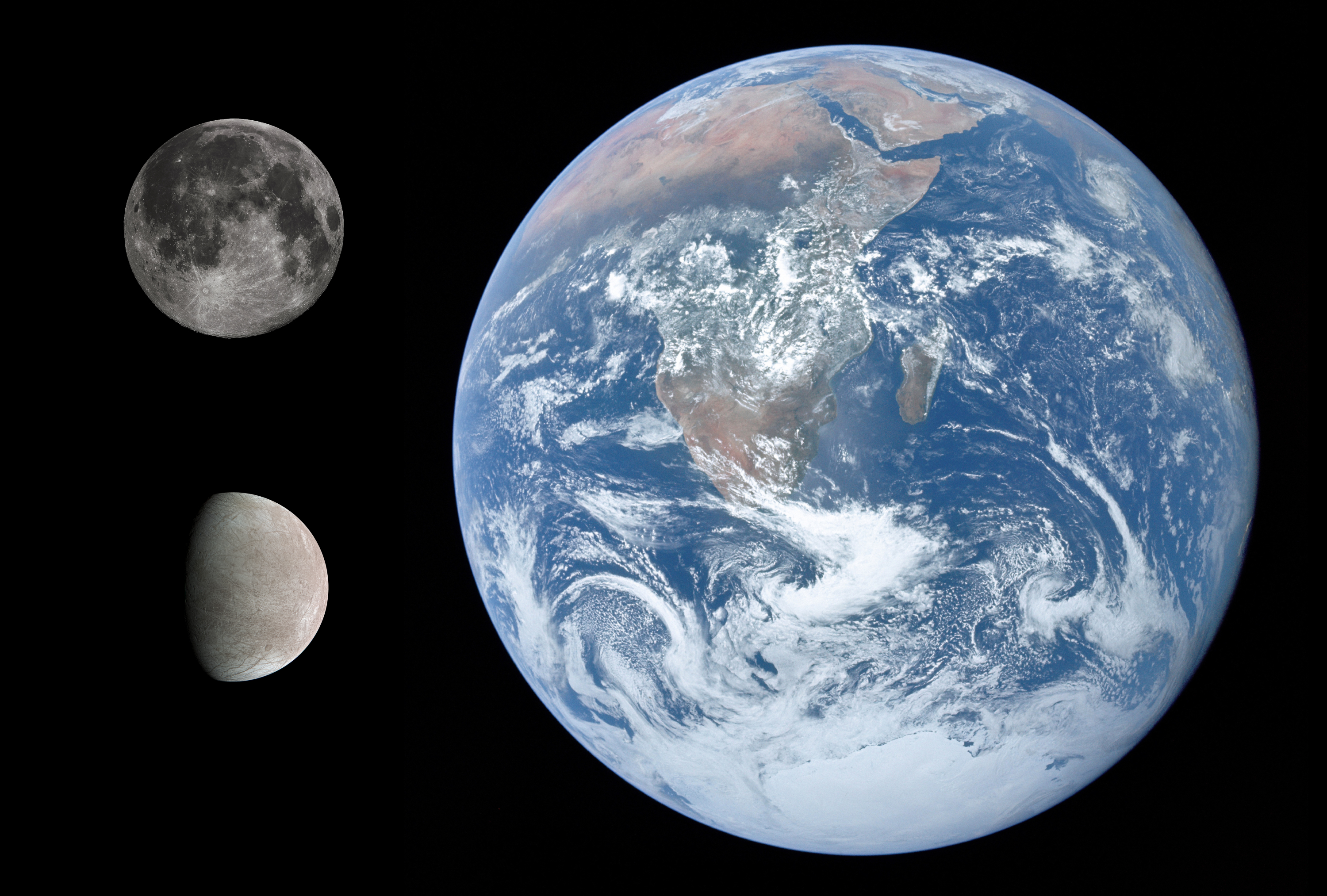
Size comparison of Europa (lower left) with the Moon (top left) and Earth (right)

Europa is slightly smaller than the Earth's moon. At just over 3,100 kilometres (1,900 mi) in diameter, it is the sixth-largest moon and fifteenth-largest object in the Solar System. It is the least massive of the Galilean satellites. Its bulk density suggests that it is similar in composition to terrestrial planets, being primarily composed of silicate rock.

=== Internal structure ===
Model of Europa's possible interior structure, with a thin ice crust and a subsurface ocean atop a rocky mantle and metallic core

It is estimated that Europa has an outer layer of water around 100 km (62 mi) thick – a part frozen as its crust and a part as a liquid ocean underneath the ice. Recent magnetic-field data from the Galileo orbiter showed that Europa has an induced magnetic field through interaction with Jupiter's, which suggests the presence of a subsurface conductive layer. This layer is likely to be a salty liquid-water ocean. Portions of the crust are estimated to have undergone a rotation of nearly 80°, nearly flipping over (see true polar wander), which would be unlikely if the ice were solidly attached to the mantle. Europa probably contains a metallic iron core.

=== Subsurface ocean ===
The scientific consensus is that a layer of liquid water exists beneath Europa's surface, and that heat from tidal flexing allows the subsurface ocean to remain liquid. Europa's surface temperature averages about 110 K (−160 °C; −260 °F) at the equator and only 50 K (−220 °C; −370 °F) at the poles, keeping Europa's icy crust as hard as granite. The first hints of a subsurface ocean came from theoretical considerations of tidal heating (a consequence of Europa's slightly eccentric orbit and orbital resonance with the other Galilean moons). Galileo imaging team members argue for the existence of a subsurface ocean from analysis of Voyager and Galileo images. The most dramatic example is "chaos terrain", a common feature on Europa's surface that some interpret as a region where the subsurface ocean has melted through the icy crust. This interpretation is controversial. Most geologists who have studied Europa favor what is commonly called the "thick ice" model, in which the ocean has rarely, if ever, directly interacted with the present surface. The best evidence for the thick-ice model is a study of Europa's large craters. The largest impact structures are surrounded by concentric rings and appear to be filled with relatively flat, fresh ice; based on this and on the calculated amount of heat generated by Europan tides, it is estimated that the outer crust of solid ice is approximately 10 to 30 km (6 to 20 mi) thick, including a ductile "warm ice" layer, which could mean that the liquid ocean underneath may be about 100 km (60 mi) deep. This leads to a volume of Europa's oceans of 3×10^{18}m^{3}, between two or three times the volume of Earth's oceans.

The thin-ice model suggests that Europa's ice shell may be only a few kilometers thick. However, most planetary scientists conclude that this model considers only those topmost layers of Europa's crust that behave elastically when affected by Jupiter's tides. One example is flexure analysis, in which Europa's crust is modeled as a plane or sphere weighted and flexed by a heavy load. Models such as this suggest the outer elastic portion of the ice crust could be as thin as 200 metres (660 ft). If the ice shell of Europa is really only a few kilometers thick, this "thin ice" model would mean that regular contact of the liquid interior with the surface could occur through open ridges, causing the formation of areas of chaotic terrain. Large impacts going fully through the ice crust would also be a way that the subsurface ocean could be exposed. However, research published in 2026 indicates that Europa's seafloor may be geologically "quiet" today. Modeling of the moon's silicate interior suggests that the rocky crust is too strong to be fractured by current tidal forces, potentially limiting the chemical energy available for life at the seafloor. According to this model any processes able to sustain habitable conditions at the Europan seafloor today must therefore be independent of ongoing tectonic activity.

==== Composition ====
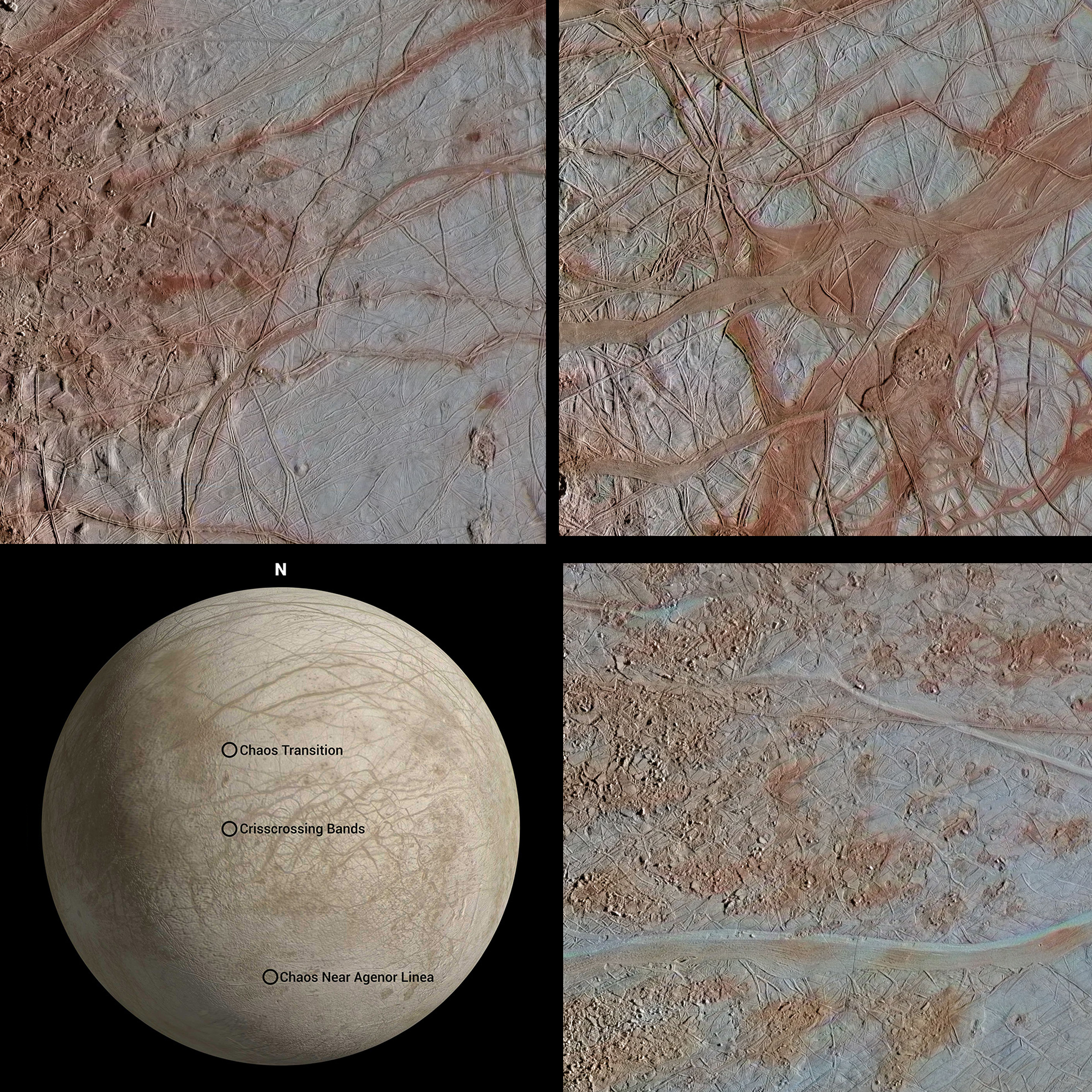
Closeup views of Europa obtained on 26 September 1998; images clockwise from upper left show locations from north to south as indicated at lower left.

The Galileo orbiter found that Europa has a weak magnetic moment, which is induced by the varying part of the Jovian magnetic field. The field strength at the magnetic equator (about 120 nT) created by this magnetic moment is about one-sixth the strength of Ganymede's field and six times the value of Callisto's. The existence of the induced moment requires a layer of a highly electrically conductive material in Europa's interior. The most plausible candidate for this role is a large subsurface ocean of liquid saltwater.

Since the Voyager spacecraft flew past Europa in 1979, scientists have worked to understand the composition of the reddish-brown material that coats fractures and other features on Europa's surface. Spectrographic evidence suggests that the darker, reddish streaks and features on Europa's surface may be rich in salts such as magnesium sulfate, deposited by evaporating water that emerged from within. Sulfuric acid hydrate is another possible explanation for the contaminant observed spectroscopically. In either case, because these materials are colorless or white when pure, some other material must also be present to account for the reddish color, and sulfur compounds are suspected.

Another hypothesis for the colored regions is that they are composed of abiotic organic compounds collectively called tholins. The morphology of Europa's impact craters and ridges is suggestive of fluidized material welling up from the fractures where pyrolysis and radiolysis take place. In order to generate colored tholins on Europa, there must be a source of materials (carbon, nitrogen, and water) and a source of energy to make the reactions occur. Impurities in the water ice crust of Europa are presumed both to emerge from the interior as cryovolcanic events that resurface the body, and to accumulate from space as interplanetary dust. Tholins bring important astrobiological implications, as they may play a role in prebiotic chemistry and abiogenesis.

The presence of sodium chloride in the internal ocean has been suggested by a 450nm absorption feature, characteristic of irradiated NaCl crystals. It has been spotted in HST observations of the chaos regions and is presumed to be areas of recent subsurface upwelling. The subterranean ocean of Europa contains carbon and was observed on the surface ice as a concentration of carbon dioxide within Tara Regio, a geologically recently resurfaced terrain. JWST NIRSpec observations show that the northern hemisphere show crystalline water ice beneath the surface and amorphous ice dominating the surface. In the southern hemisphere regiones Tara and Powys, crystalline water ice dominates both the surface and the deeper layers. These two regiones likely experience ongoing thermal (re)crystallization, as the radiation near Jupiter causes particle amorphization at the top 10 microns over a period of less than 15 days.

Reprocessing of the old Galileo infrared spectra of Europa revealed a weak absorption band at wavelength 2.2 μm, which is identified with ammonia. The position of the band indicates that ammonia is present either as ammonia hydrate or ammonium chloride. The strength of the band correlates with linear or banded surface feature suggesting that ammonia was recently upwelled from below via effusive cryovolcanism or similar mechanisms. The presence of ammonia in the oceanic water can significantly lower the ice melting temperature leading to a thicker and chemically reduced ocean.

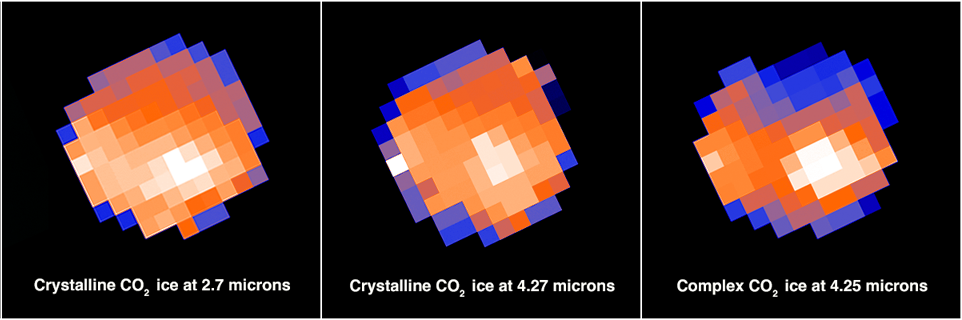
A series of images of Europa in different wavelengths by the James Webb Space Telescope. The different wavelengths show the presence of different forms of carbon dioxide on Europa.

==== Plumes ====
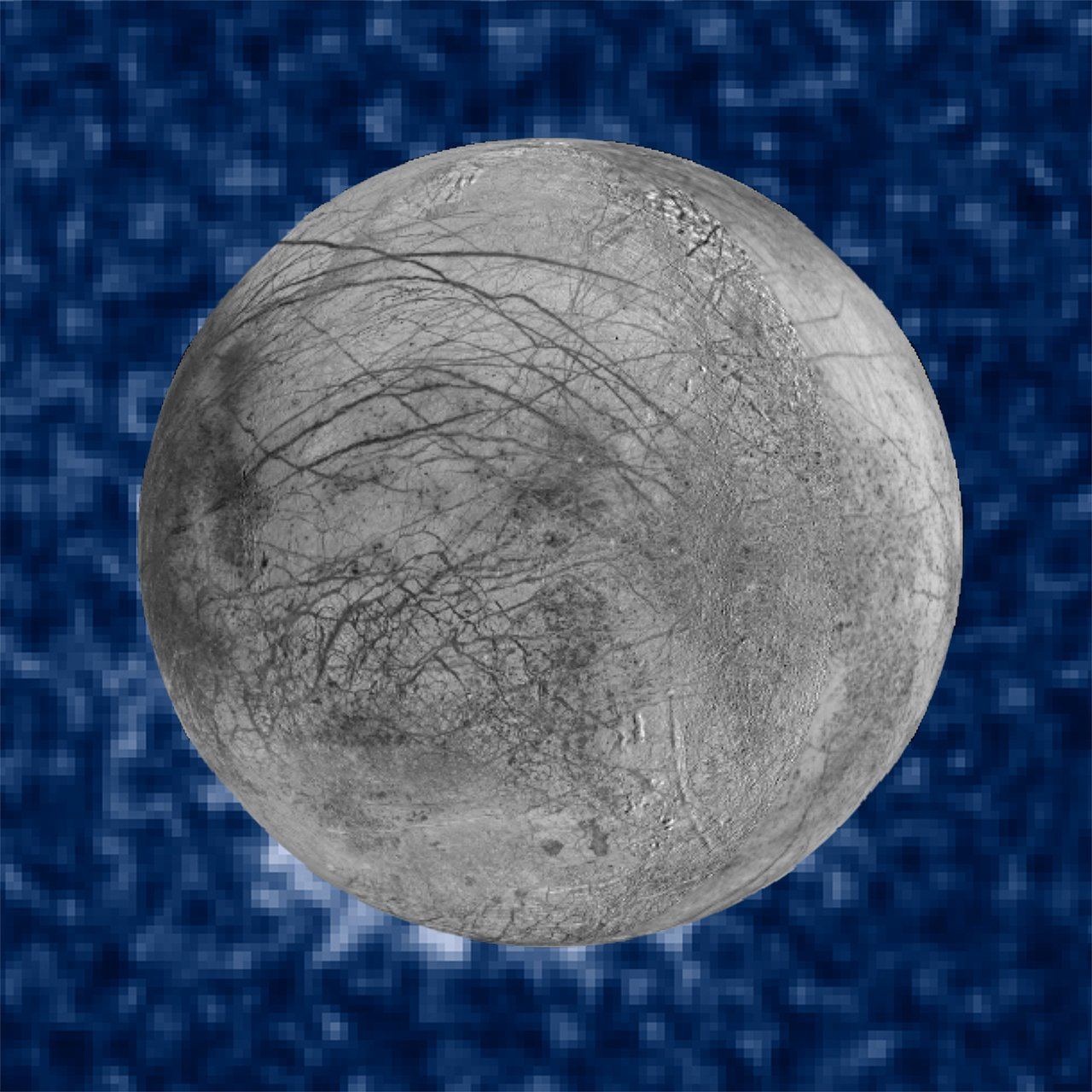
Photo composite of suspected water plumes on Europa

The Hubble Space Telescope acquired an image of Europa in 2012 that was interpreted to be a plume of water vapour erupting from near its south pole. The image suggests the plume may be 200 km (120 mi) high, or more than 20 times the height of Mt. Everest., though recent observations and modeling suggest that typical Europan plumes may be much smaller. It has been suggested that if plumes exist, they are episodic and likely to appear when Europa is at its farthest point from Jupiter, in agreement with tidal force modeling predictions. Additional imaging evidence from the Hubble Space Telescope was presented in September 2016.

In May 2018, astronomers provided supporting evidence of water plume activity on Europa, based on an updated critical analysis of data obtained from the Galileo space probe, which orbited Jupiter between 1995 and 2003. Galileo flew by Europa in 1997 within 206 km (128 mi) of the moon's surface and the researchers suggest it may have flown through a water plume. Such plume activity could help researchers in a search for life from the subsurface Europan ocean without having to land on the moon.

The tidal forces are about 1,000 times stronger than the Moon's effect on Earth. The only other moon in the Solar System exhibiting water vapor plumes is Enceladus. The estimated eruption rate at Europa is about 7000 kg/s compared to about 200 kg/s for the plumes of Enceladus. If confirmed, it would open the possibility of a flyby through the plume to obtain a sample to analyze in situ. This would avoid having to use a lander to drill through kilometres of ice.

In November 2020, a study was published in the peer-reviewed scientific journal Geophysical Research Letters suggesting that the plumes may originate from water within the crust of Europa as opposed to its subsurface ocean. The study's model, using images from the Galileo space probe, proposed that a combination of freezing and pressurization may result in at least some of the cryovolcanic activity. The pressure generated by migrating briny water pockets would thus, eventually, burst through the crust, thereby creating these plumes. The hypothesis that cryovolcanism on Europa could be triggered by freezing and pressurization of liquid pockets in the icy crust was first proposed by Sarah Fagents at the University of Hawaiʻi at Mānoa, who in 2003, was the first to model and publish work on this process. A press release from NASA's Jet Propulsion Laboratory referencing the November 2020 study suggested that plumes sourced from migrating liquid pockets could potentially be less hospitable to life. This is due to a lack of substantial energy for organisms to thrive on, unlike proposed hydrothermal vents on the subsurface ocean floor.

A 2026 paper found no evidence of localized water vapor on Europa, suggesting that previous observations were due to inaccurate positioning of Europa's disk on the telescope images.

=== Sources of heat ===
Europa receives thermal energy from tidal heating, which occurs through the tidal friction and tidal flexing processes caused by tidal acceleration: orbital and rotational energy are dissipated as heat in the core of the moon, the internal ocean, and the ice crust.

==== Tidal friction ====
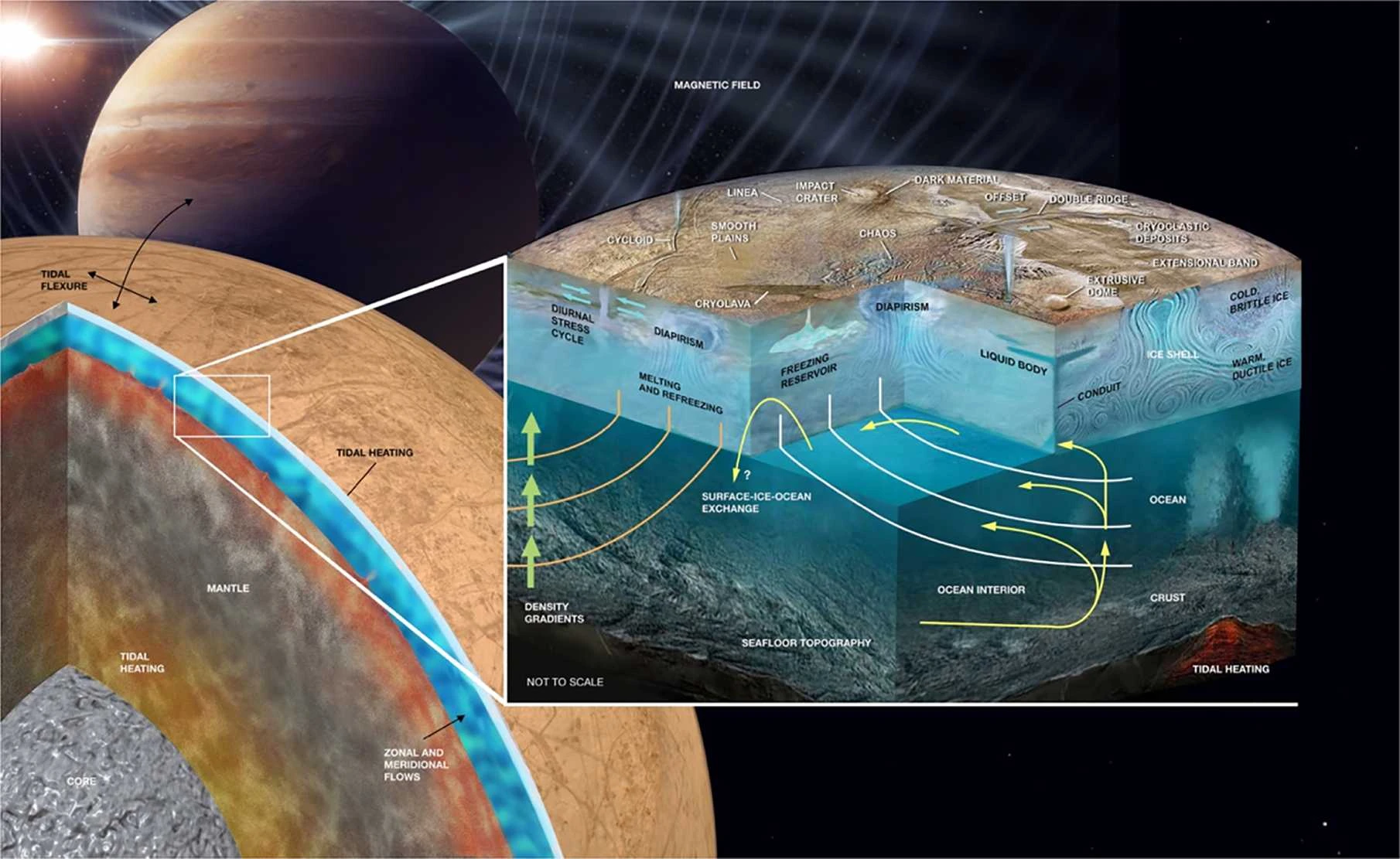
Europa's ice shell processes and tidal heating

Ocean tides are converted to heat by frictional losses in the oceans and their interaction with the solid bottom and with the top ice crust. In late 2008, it was suggested Jupiter may keep Europa's oceans warm by generating large planetary tidal waves on Europa because of its small but non-zero obliquity. This generates so-called Rossby waves that travel quite slowly, at just a few kilometers per day, but can generate significant kinetic energy. For the current axial tilt estimate of 0.1 degree, the resonance from Rossby waves would contain 7.3×10^{18} J of kinetic energy, which is two thousand times larger than that of the flow excited by the dominant tidal forces. Dissipation of this energy could be the principal heat source of Europa's ocean.

==== Tidal flexing ====
Tidal flexing kneads Europa's interior and ice shell, which becomes a source of heat. Depending on the amount of tilt, the heat generated by the ocean flow could be 100 to thousands of times greater than the heat generated by the flexing of Europa's rocky core in response to the gravitational pull from Jupiter and the other moons circling that planet. Europa's seafloor could be heated by the moon's constant flexing, driving hydrothermal activity similar to undersea volcanoes in Earth's oceans.

Experiments and ice modeling published in 2016, indicate that tidal flexing dissipation can generate one order of magnitude more heat in Europa's ice than scientists had previously assumed. Their results indicate that most of the heat generated by the ice actually comes from the ice's crystalline structure (lattice) as a result of deformation, and not friction between the ice grains. The greater the deformation of the ice sheet, the more heat is generated.

==== Radioactive decay ====
In addition to tidal heating, the interior of Europa could also be heated by the decay of radioactive material (radiogenic heating) within the rocky mantle. But the models and values observed are one hundred times higher than those that could be produced by radiogenic heating alone, thus implying that tidal heating has a leading role in Europa.

== Surface environment ==
=== Ice shell and surface ===
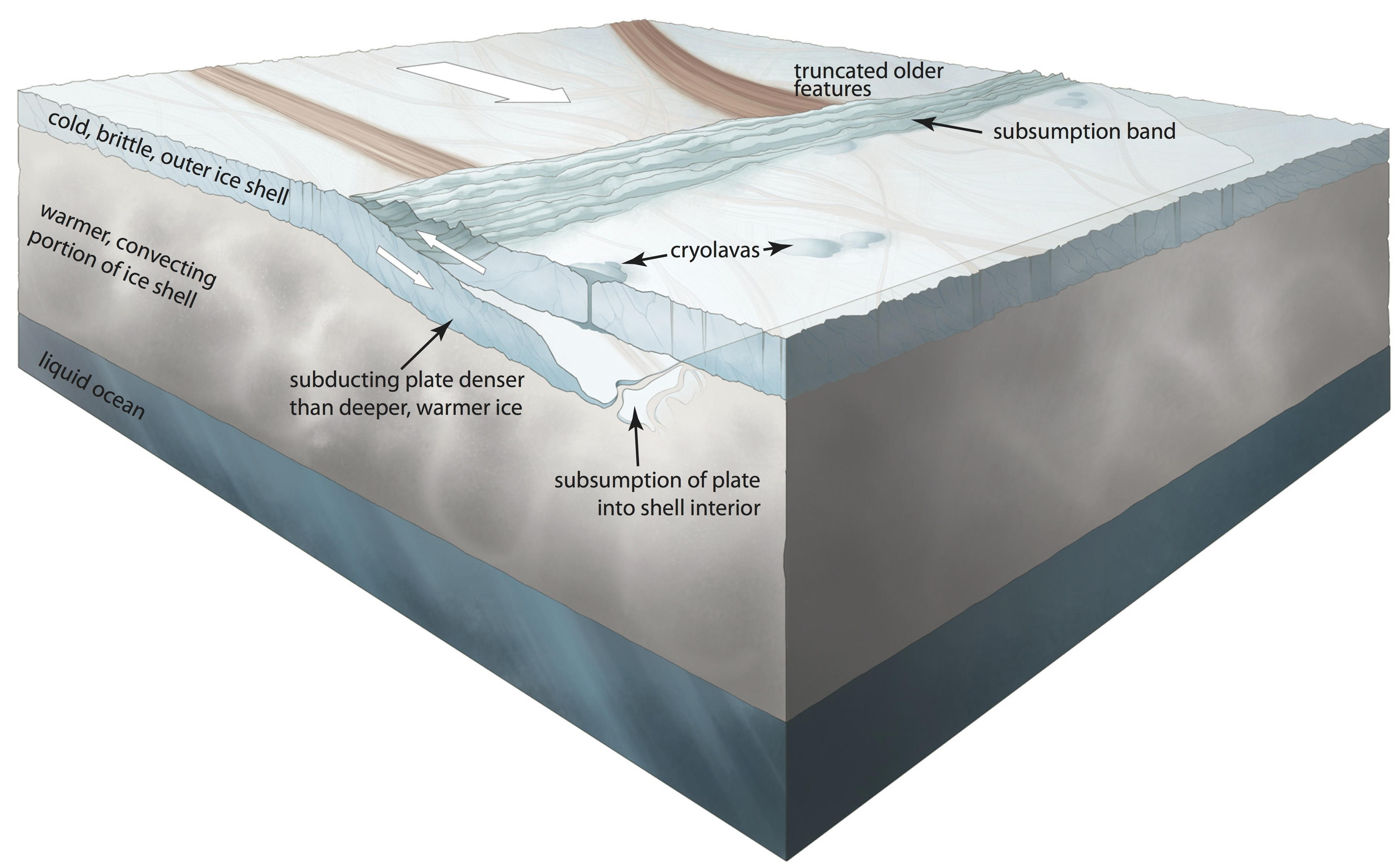
Hypothetical subduction-like activity which may be occurring on Europa

Europa is the smoothest known object in the Solar System, lacking large-scale features such as mountains and craters. The prominent markings crisscrossing Europa appear to be mainly albedo features that emphasize low topography. There are few craters on Europa, because its surface is tectonically too active and therefore young. The craters show the presence of hydrated salts dredged from the subsurface, but little sulfuric acid, indicating the impacts that formed them were very recent. Its icy crust has an albedo (light reflectivity) of 0.64, one of the highest of any moon. This indicates a young and active surface: based on estimates of the frequency of cometary bombardment that Europa experiences, the surface is about 20 to 180 million years old.

It has been postulated Europa's equator may be covered in icy spikes called penitentes, which may be up to 15 meters high. Their formation is due to direct overhead sunlight near the equator causing the ice to sublime, forming vertical cracks. Although the imaging available from the Galileo orbiter does not have the resolution for confirmation, radar and thermal data are consistent with this speculation.

==== Lineae ====
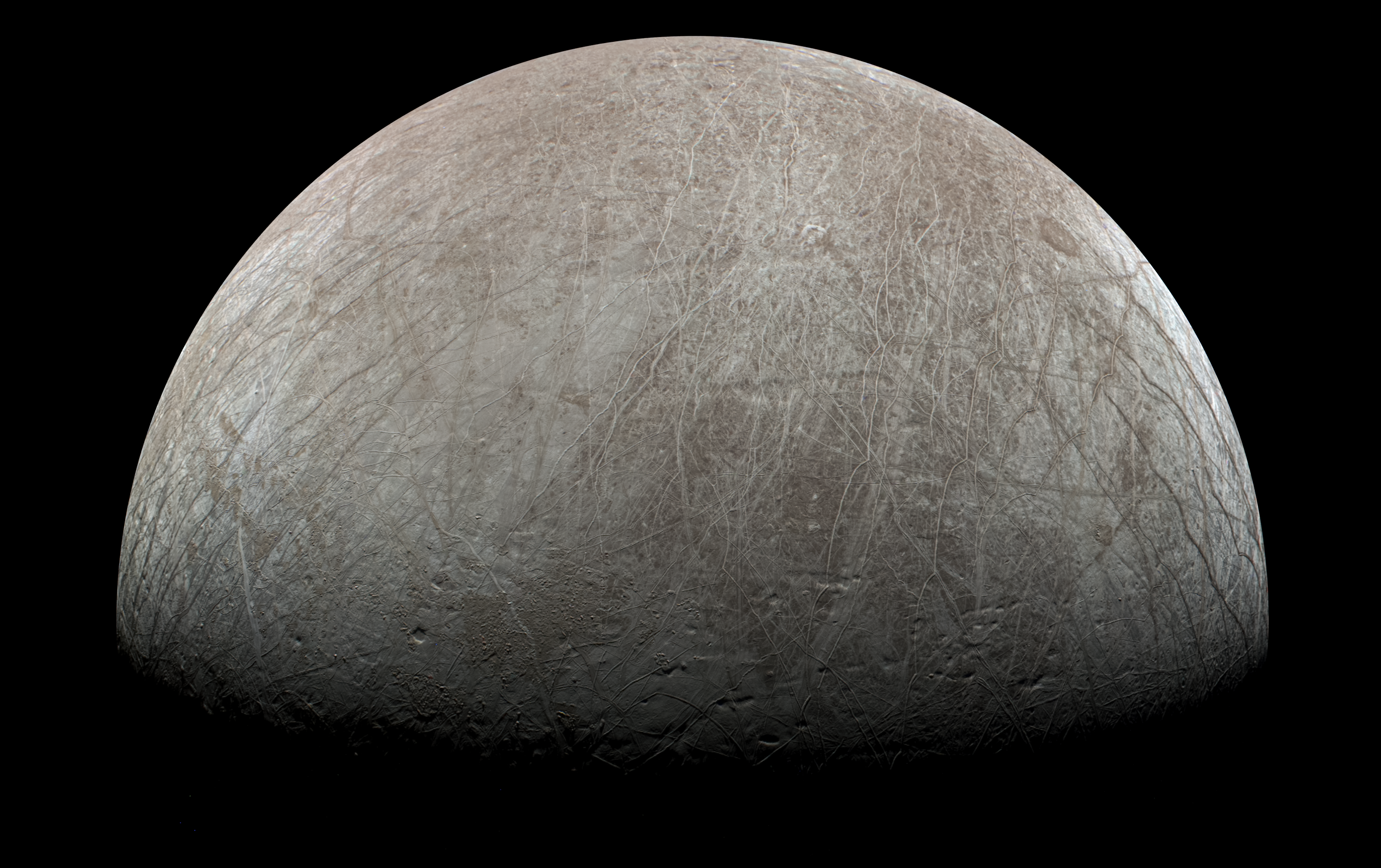
True color mosaic of Europa's numerous lineae. The region of lineae at the center of this image is the Annwn Regio.

Europa's most striking surface features are a series of dark streaks crisscrossing the entire globe, called lineae (English: lines). Close examination shows that the edges of Europa's crust on either side of the cracks have moved relative to each other. The larger bands are more than 20 km (12 mi) across, often with dark, diffuse outer edges, regular striations, and a central band of lighter material.

The most likely hypothesis is that the lineae on Europa were produced by a series of eruptions of warm ice as Europa's crust slowly spreads open to expose warmer layers beneath. The effect would have been similar to that seen on Earth's oceanic ridges. These various fractures are thought to have been caused in large part by the tidal flexing exerted by Jupiter. Because Europa is tidally locked to Jupiter, and therefore always maintains approximately the same orientation towards Jupiter, the stress patterns should form a distinctive and predictable pattern. However, only the youngest of Europa's fractures conform to the predicted pattern; other fractures appear to occur at increasingly different orientations the older they are. This could be explained if Europa's surface rotates slightly faster than its interior, an effect that is possible due to the subsurface ocean mechanically decoupling Europa's surface from its rocky mantle and the effects of Jupiter's gravity tugging on Europa's outer ice crust. Comparisons of Voyager and Galileo spacecraft photos serve to put an upper limit on this hypothetical slippage. A full revolution of the outer rigid shell relative to the interior of Europa takes at least 12,000 years. Studies of Voyager and Galileo images have revealed evidence of subduction on Europa's surface, suggesting that, just as the cracks are analogous to ocean ridges, so plates of icy crust analogous to tectonic plates on Earth are recycled into the molten interior. This evidence of both crustal spreading at bands and convergence at other sites suggests that Europa may have active plate tectonics, similar to Earth. However, the physics driving these plate tectonics are not likely to resemble those driving terrestrial plate tectonics, as the forces resisting potential Earth-like plate motions in Europa's crust are significantly stronger than the forces that could drive them.

==== Chaos and lenticulae ====
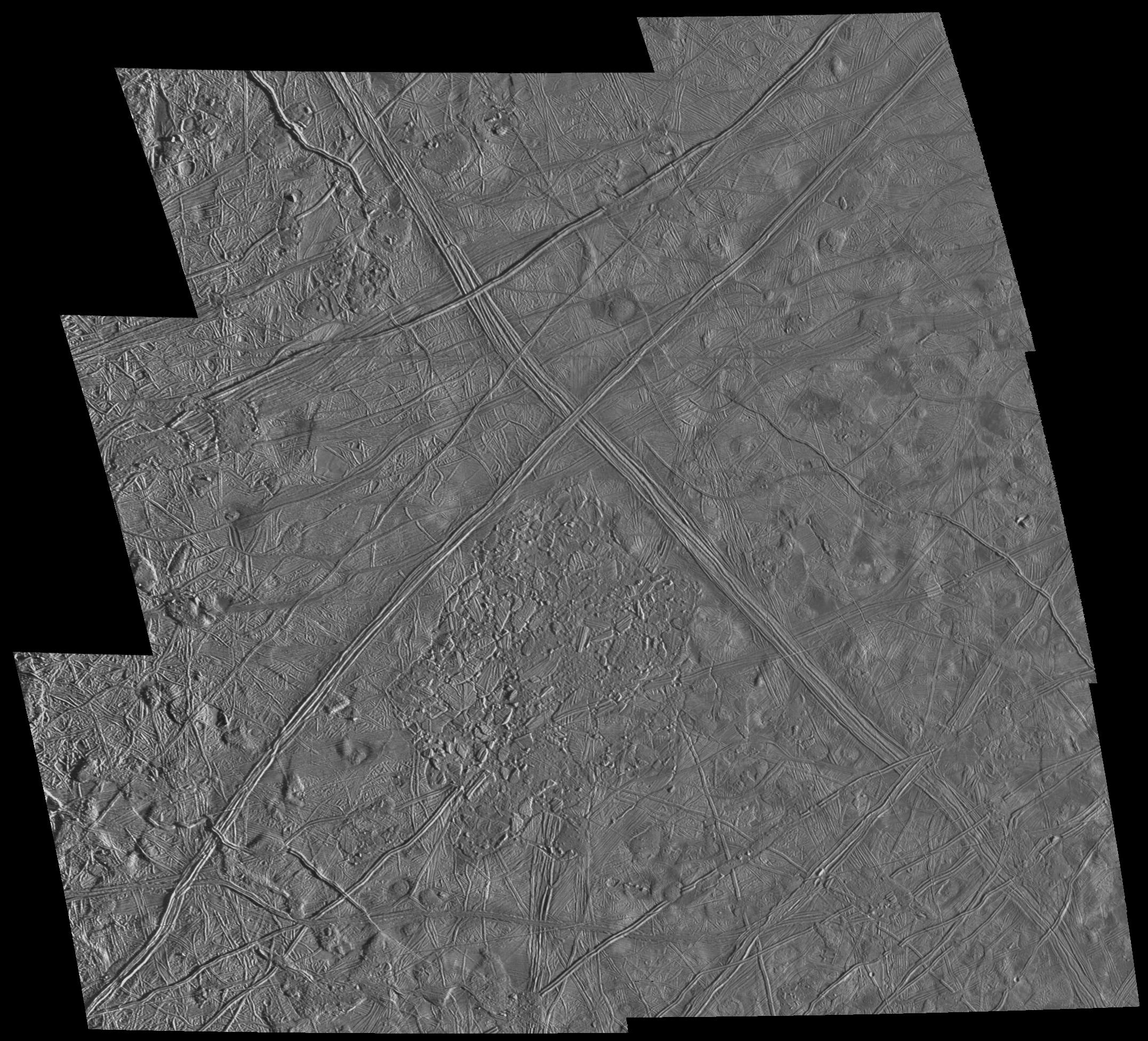
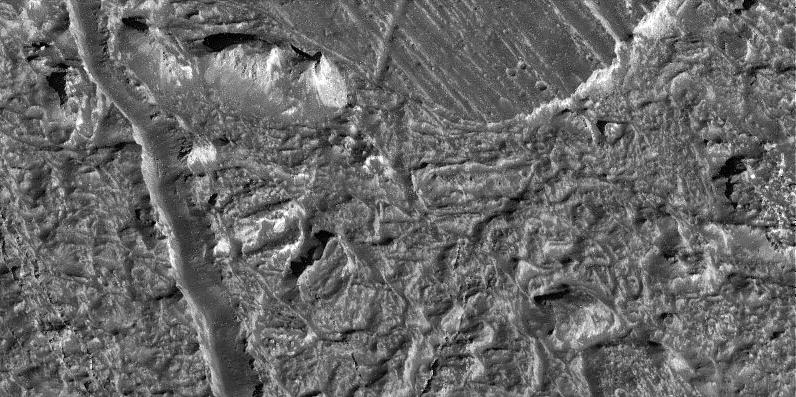
Left: surface features indicative of tidal flexing: lineae, lenticulae and the Conamara Chaos region (close-up, right) where craggy, 250 m high peaks and smooth plates are jumbled together

Other features present on Europa are circular and elliptical lenticulae (Latin for "freckles"). Many are domes, some are pits and some are smooth, dark spots. Others have a jumbled or rough texture. The dome tops look like pieces of the older plains around them, suggesting that the domes formed when the plains were pushed up from below.

One hypothesis states that these lenticulae were formed by diapirs of warm ice rising up through the colder ice of the outer crust, much like magma chambers in Earth's crust. The smooth, dark spots could be formed by meltwater released when the warm ice breaks through the surface. The rough, jumbled lenticulae (called regions of "chaos"; for example, Conamara Chaos) would then be formed from many small fragments of crust, embedded in hummocky, dark material, appearing like icebergs in a frozen sea.

An alternative hypothesis suggests that lenticulae are actually small areas of chaos and that the claimed pits, spots and domes are artifacts resulting from the over-interpretation of early, low-resolution Galileo images. The implication is that the ice is too thin to support the convective diapir model of feature formation.

In November 2011, a team of researchers, including researchers at University of Texas at Austin, presented evidence suggesting that many "chaos terrain" features on Europa sit atop vast lakes of liquid water. These lakes would be entirely encased in Europa's icy outer shell and distinct from a liquid ocean thought to exist farther down beneath the ice shell. Full confirmation of the lakes' existence will require a space mission designed to probe the ice shell either physically or indirectly, e.g. using radar. Chaos features may also be a result of increased melting of the ice shell and deposition of marine ice at low latitudes as a result of heterogeneous heating.

Work published by researchers from Williams College suggests that chaos terrain may represent sites where impacting comets penetrated through the ice crust and into an underlying ocean.

=== Radiation environment ===
The ionizing radiation level at Europa's surface is equivalent to a daily dose of about 5.4 Sv (540 rem), an amount that would cause severe illness or death in human beings exposed for a single Earth day (24 hours). A Europan day is about 3.5 times as long as an Earth day.

=== Atmosphere ===
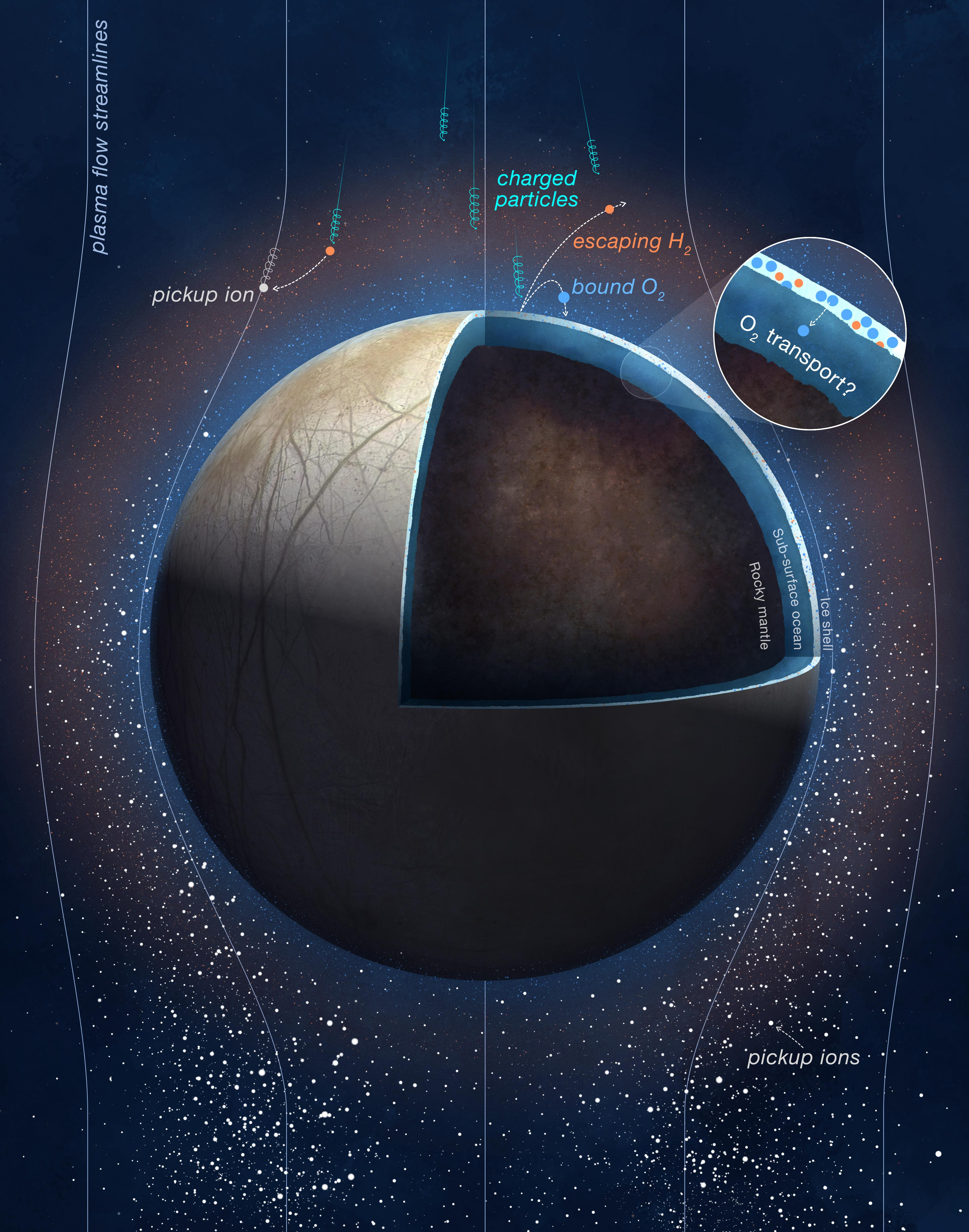
Diagram of how Europa's atmosphere is created by bombardment from ionized particles

The atmosphere of Europa can be categorized as thin and tenuous (often called an exosphere), primarily composed of oxygen and trace amounts of water vapor. However, this quantity of oxygen is produced in a non-biological manner. Given that Europa's surface is icy, and subsequently very cold; as solar ultraviolet radiation and charged particles (ions and electrons) from the Jovian magnetospheric environment collide with Europa's surface, water vapor is created and instantaneously separated into oxygen and hydrogen constituents. As it continues to move, the hydrogen is light enough to pass through the surface gravity of the atmosphere leaving behind only oxygen. The surface-bounded atmosphere forms through radiolysis, the dissociation of molecules through radiation. This accumulated oxygen atmosphere can get to a height of 190 km (120 mi) above the surface of Europa. Molecular oxygen is the densest component of the atmosphere because it has a long lifetime; after returning to the surface, it does not stick (freeze) like a water or hydrogen peroxide molecule but rather releases from the surface and starts another ballistic arc. Molecular hydrogen never reaches the surface, as it is light enough to escape Europa's surface gravity. Europa is one of the few moons in the Solar System with a quantifiable atmosphere, along with Titan, Io, Triton, Ganymede and Callisto. Europa is also one of several moons in the Solar System with very large quantities of ice (volatiles), otherwise known as "icy moons".

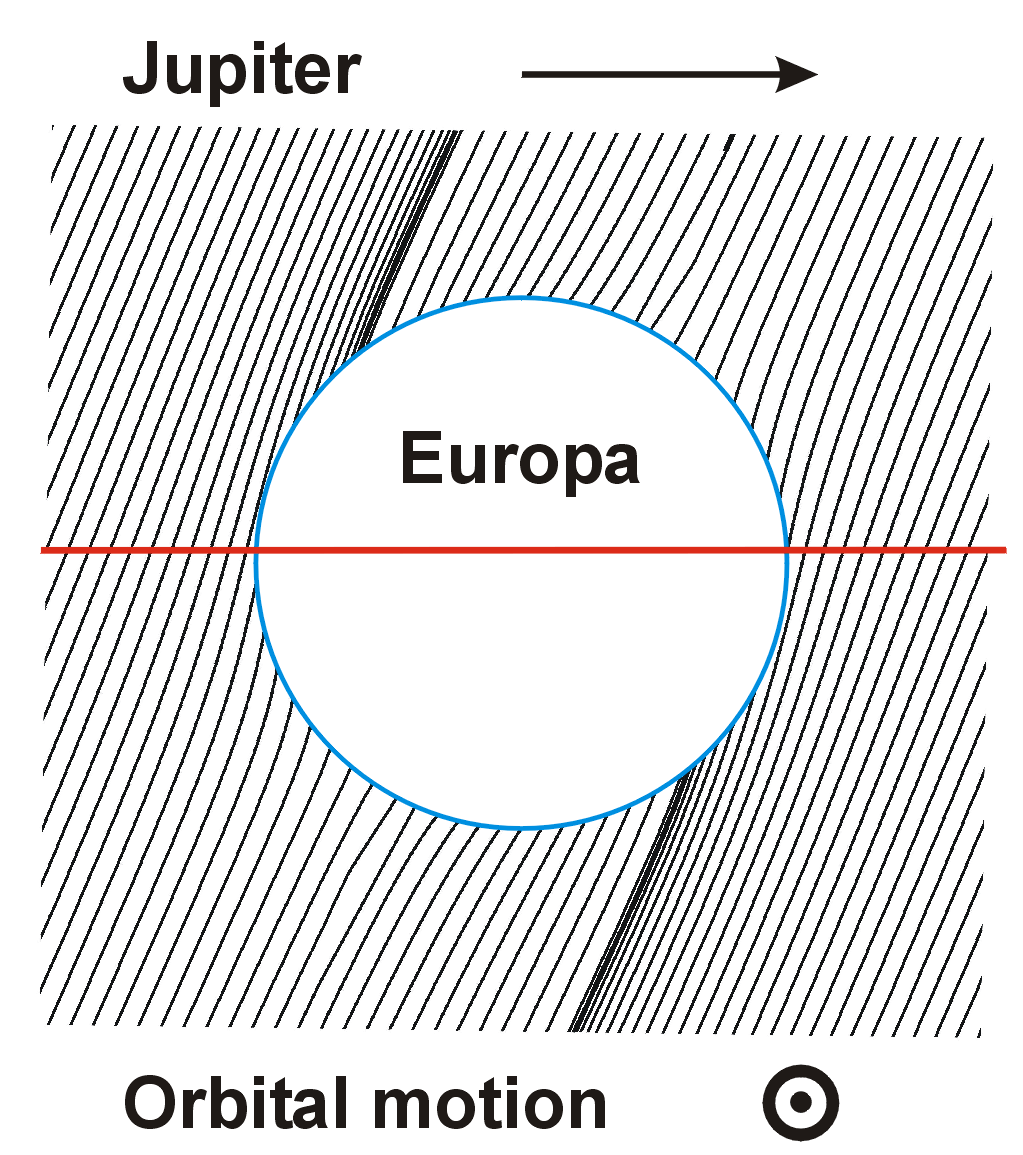
Magnetic field around Europa. The red line shows a trajectory of the Galileo spacecraft during a typical flyby (E4 or E14).

Europa is also considered to be geologically active due to the constant release of hydrogen-oxygen mixtures into space. As a result of the moon's particle venting, the atmosphere requires continuous replenishment. Europa also contains a small magnetosphere (approximately 25% of Ganymede's). However, this magnetosphere varies in size as Europa orbits through Jupiter's magnetic field. This confirms that a conductive element, such as a large ocean, likely lies below its icy surface. As multiple studies have been conducted over Europa's atmosphere, several findings conclude that not all oxygen molecules are released into the atmosphere. This unknown percentage of oxygen may be absorbed into the surface and sink into the subsurface. Because the surface may interact with the subsurface ocean (considering the geological discussion above), this molecular oxygen may make its way to the ocean, where it could aid in biological processes. One estimate suggests that, given the turnover rate inferred from the apparent ~0.5 Gyr maximum age of Europa's surface ice, subduction of radiolytically generated oxidizing species might well lead to oceanic free oxygen concentrations that are comparable to those in terrestrial deep oceans.

Experimental work on the oxygen–water system under pressure has shown that oxygen hydrate — in which O_{2} molecules are trapped within an ice lattice — remains stable to at least 2.6 GPa, a pressure exceeding that expected both above and below Europa's proposed subsurface ocean, suggesting radiolytic oxygen could be retained within the ice shell rather than being lost to space or fully absorbed at shallow depth. The same study found that oxygen and hydrogen hydrates share structural similarities that could hold both radiolysis products in close proximity, enhancing their recombination back into water — a mechanism proposed to help explain why measured oxygen production rates at Europa are lower than theoretical predictions.

Through the slow release of oxygen and hydrogen, a neutral torus around Europa's orbital plane is formed. This "neutral cloud" has been detected by both the Cassini and Galileo spacecraft, and has a greater content (number of atoms and molecules) than the neutral cloud surrounding Jupiter's inner moon Io. This torus was officially confirmed using Energetic Neutral Atom (ENA) imaging. Europa's torus ionizes through the process of neutral particles exchanging electrons with its charged particles. Since Europa's magnetic field rotates faster than its orbital velocity, these ions are left in the path of its magnetic field trajectory, forming a plasma. It has been hypothesized that these ions are responsible for the plasma within Jupiter's magnetosphere.

On 4 March 2024, astronomers reported that the surface of Europa may have much less oxygen than previously inferred.

==== Discovery of atmosphere ====
The atmosphere of Europa was first discovered in 1995 by astronomers D. T. Hall and collaborators using the Goddard High Resolution Spectrograph instrument of the Hubble Space Telescope. This observation was further supported in 1997 by the Galileo orbiter during its mission within the Jovian system. The Galileo orbiter performed three radio occultation events of Europa, where the probe's radio contact with Earth was temporarily blocked by passing behind Europa. By analyzing the effects Europa's sparse atmosphere had on the radio signal just before and after the occultation, for a total of six events, a team of astronomers led by A. J. Kliore established the presence of an ionized layer in Europa's atmosphere.

==== Climate and weather ====
Despite the presence of a gas torus, Europa has no weather producing clouds. As a whole, Europa has no wind, precipitation, or presence of sky color as its gravity is too low to hold an atmosphere substantial enough for those features. Europa's gravity is approximately 13% of Earth's. The temperature on Europa varies from −160 °C at the equator, to −220 °C at either of its poles. Europa's subsurface ocean is thought to have a temperature near 273 K (0 °C). It is hypothesized that because of radioactive and tidal heating (as mentioned in the sections above), there are points in the depths of Europa's ocean that may be only slightly cooler than Earth's oceans. Studies have also concluded that Europa's ocean would have been rather acidic at first, with large concentrations of sulfate, calcium, and carbon dioxide. However, over 4.5 billion years it became chloride-rich, thus resembling our 1.94% chloride oceans on Earth.

== Exploration ==
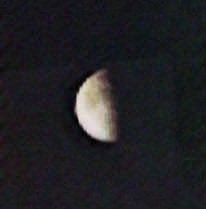
In 1973 Pioneer 10 made the first closeup images of Europa. The probe was too far away to obtain more detailed images.

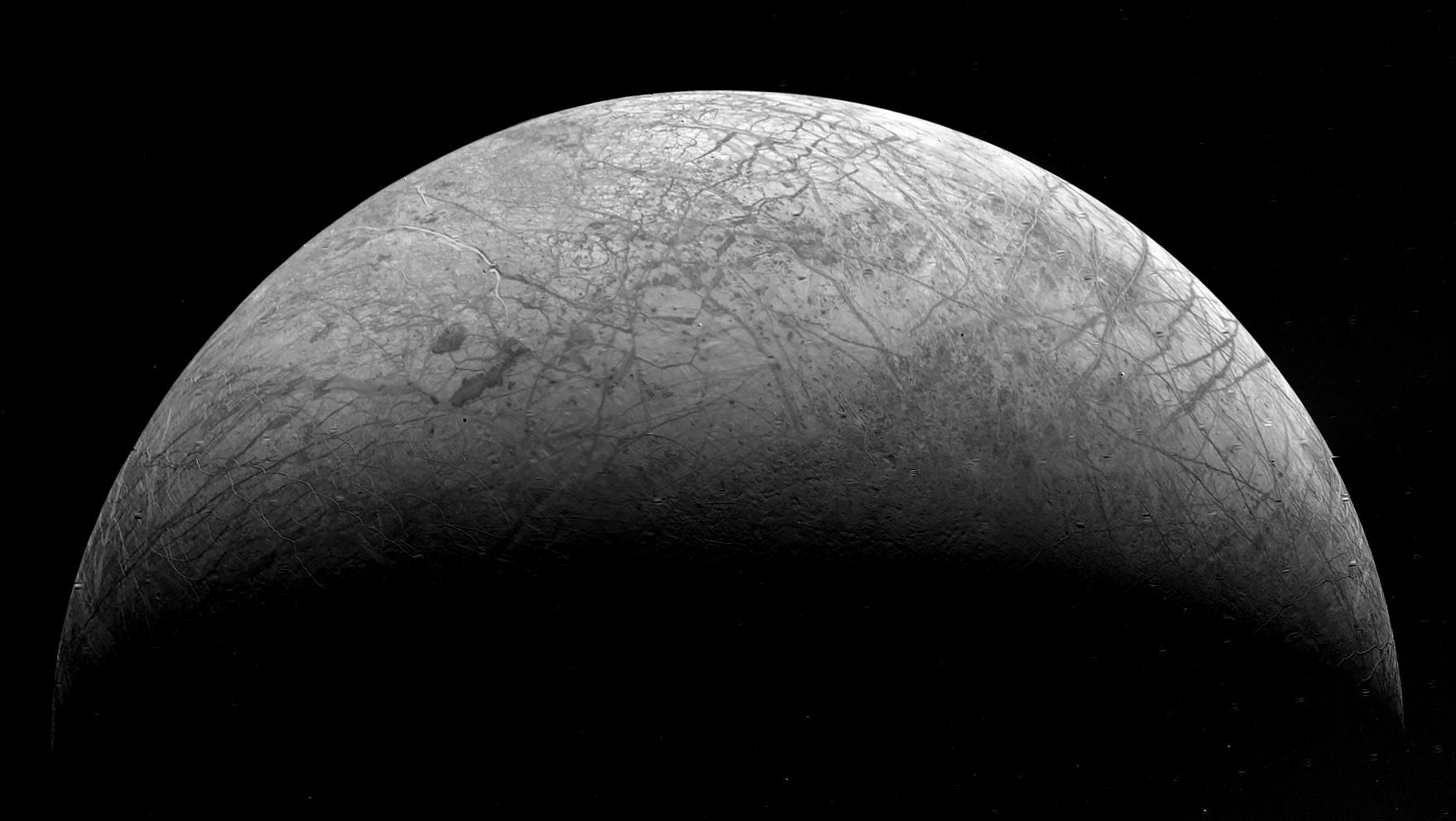
Europa seen in detail in 1979 by Voyager 2

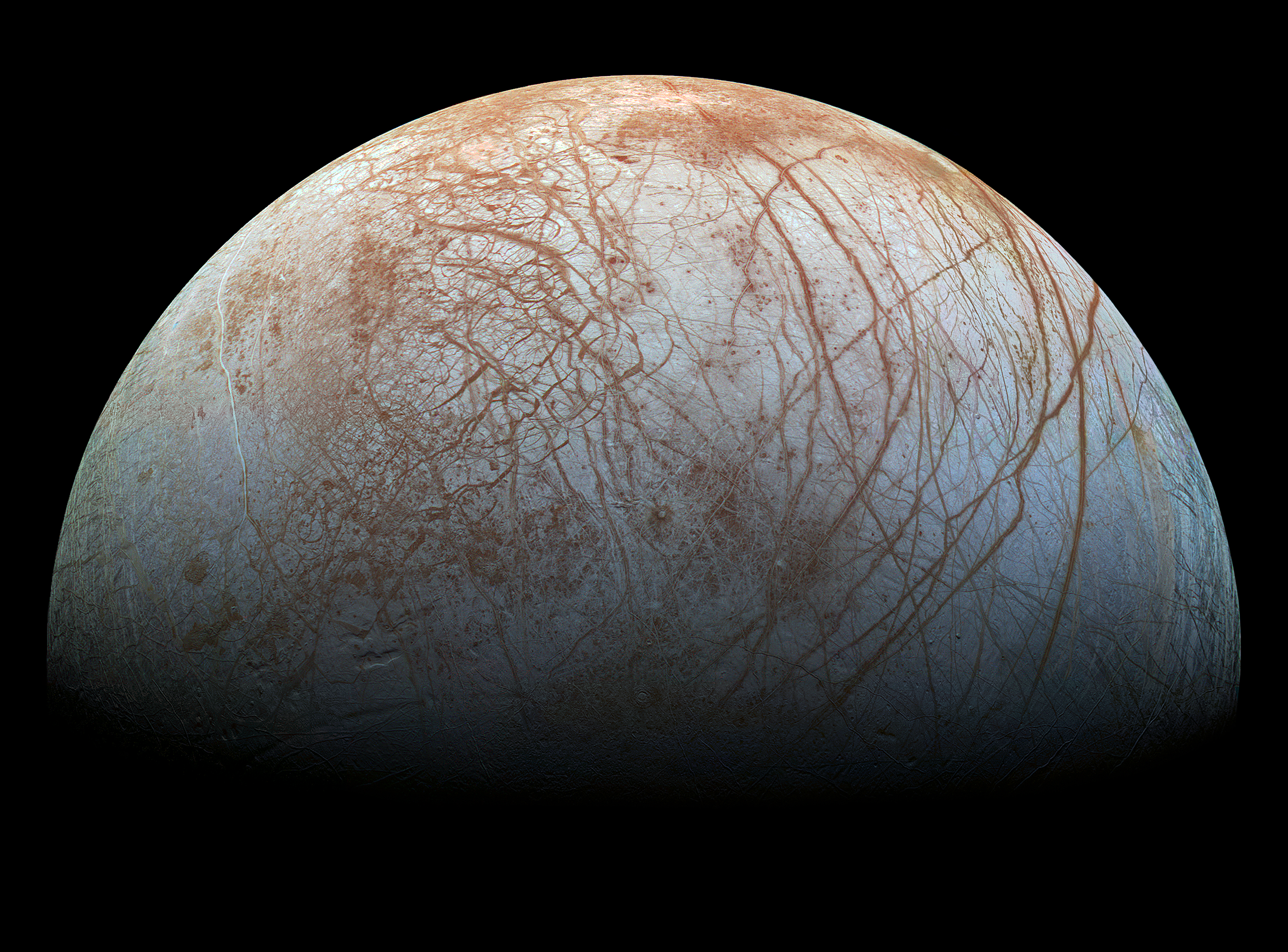
Realistic-color Galileo mosaic of Europa.

Gravitational calculations suggested by the start of 20th century that Europa's composition was water rich, and Earth ground based observations by Gerard Kuiper revealed the water ice composition in 1957.

Exploration of Europa began with the Jupiter flybys of Pioneer 10 and 11 in 1973 and 1974, respectively. The first closeup photos were of low resolution compared to later missions. The two Voyager probes traveled through the Jovian system in 1979, providing more-detailed images of Europa's icy surface. The images suggested the possibility of a liquid ocean underneath. Starting in 1995, the Galileo space probe orbited Jupiter for eight years, until 2003, and provided the most detailed examination of the Galilean moons to date. It included the "Galileo Europa Mission" and "Galileo Millennium Mission", with numerous close flybys of Europa. In 2007, New Horizons imaged Europa, as it flew by the Jovian system while on its way to Pluto. In 2022, the Juno orbiter flew by Europa at a distance of 352 km (219 mi).

In 2012, Jupiter Icy Moons Explorer (Juice) was selected by the European Space Agency (ESA) as a planned mission. That mission includes two flybys of Europa, but is more focused on Ganymede. It was launched in 2023, and is expected to reach Jupiter in July 2031 after four gravity assists and eight years of travel.

In 2011, a Europa mission was recommended by the U.S. Planetary Science Decadal Survey. In response, NASA commissioned concept studies of a Europa lander in 2011, along with concepts for a Europa flyby (Europa Clipper), and a Europa orbiter. The orbiter element option concentrates on the "ocean" science, while the multiple-flyby element (Clipper) concentrates on the chemistry and energy science. On 13 January 2014, the House Appropriations Committee announced a new bipartisan bill that includes $80 million in funding to continue the Europa mission concept studies.

In July 2013 an updated concept for a flyby Europa mission called Europa Clipper was presented by the Jet Propulsion Laboratory (JPL) and the Applied Physics Laboratory (APL). In May 2015, NASA announced that it had accepted development of the Europa Clipper mission, and revealed the instruments it would use. The aim of Europa Clipper is to explore Europa in order to investigate its habitability, and to aid in selecting sites for a future lander. The Europa Clipper would not orbit Europa, but instead orbit Jupiter and conduct 45 low-altitude flybys of Europa during its envisioned mission. The probe would carry an ice-penetrating radar, short-wave infrared spectrometer, topographical imager, and an ion- and neutral-mass spectrometer. The mission was launched on 14 October 2024 aboard a Falcon Heavy.

=== Future missions ===
Conjectures regarding extraterrestrial life have ensured a high profile for Europa and have led to steady lobbying for future missions. The aims of these missions have ranged from examining Europa's chemical composition to searching for extraterrestrial life in its hypothesized subsurface oceans. Robotic missions to Europa need to endure the high-radiation environment around Jupiter. Because it is deeply embedded within Jupiter's magnetosphere, Europa receives about 5.40 Sv of radiation per day.

- Europa Lander is a recent NASA concept mission under study. 2018 research suggests Europa may be covered in tall, jagged ice spikes, presenting a problem for any potential landing on its surface.
- Buoyant Rover for Under-Ice Exploration (BRUIE) is an autonomous underwater vehicle prototype being developed by JPL, planned to explore Europa's underwater oceans to search for extraterrestrial life.

=== Old proposals ===
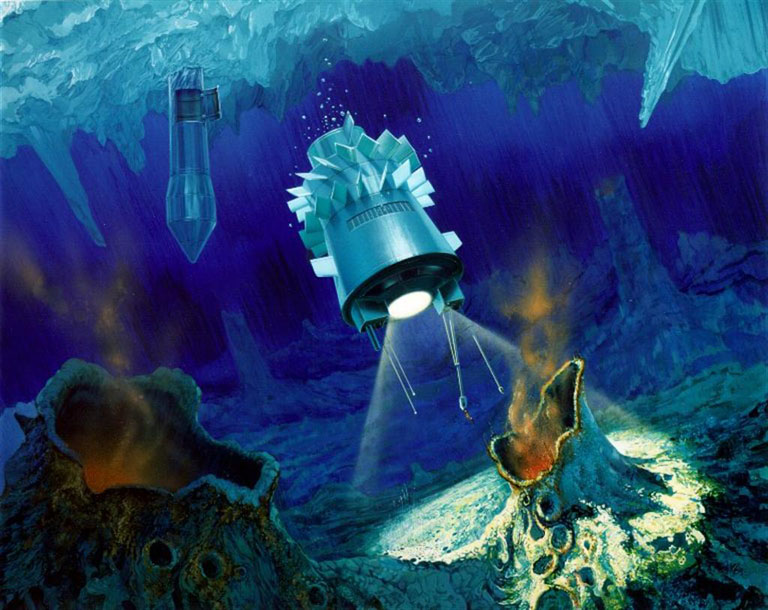
Artist's concept of the cryobot and its deployed "hydrobot" submersible

In the early 2000s, Jupiter Europa Orbiter led by NASA and the Jupiter Ganymede Orbiter led by the ESA were proposed together as an Outer Planet Flagship Mission to Jupiter's icy moons called Europa Jupiter System Mission, with a planned launch in 2020. In 2009 it was given priority over Titan Saturn System Mission. At that time, there was competition from other proposals. Japan proposed Jupiter Magnetospheric Orbiter.

Jovian Europa Orbiter was an ESA Cosmic Vision concept study from 2007. Another concept was Ice Clipper, which would have used an impactor similar to the Deep Impact mission—it would make a controlled crash into the surface of Europa, generating a plume of debris that would then be collected by a small spacecraft flying through the plume.

Jupiter Icy Moons Orbiter (JIMO) was a partially developed fission-powered spacecraft with ion thrusters that was cancelled in 2006. It was part of Project Prometheus. The Europa Lander Mission proposed a small nuclear-powered Europa lander for JIMO. It would travel with the orbiter, which would also function as a communication relay to Earth.

Europa Orbiter – Its objective would be to characterize the extent of the ocean and its relation to the deeper interior. Instrument payload could include a radio subsystem, laser altimeter, magnetometer, Langmuir probe, and a mapping camera. The Europa Orbiter received the go-ahead in 1999 but was canceled in 2002. This orbiter featured a special ice-penetrating radar that would allow it to scan below the surface.

More ambitious ideas have been put forward including an impactor in combination with a thermal drill to search for biosignatures that might be frozen in the shallow subsurface.

Another proposal put forward in 2001 calls for a large nuclear-powered "melt probe" (cryobot) that would melt through the ice until it reached an ocean below. Once it reached the water, it would deploy an autonomous underwater vehicle (hydrobot) that would gather information and send it back to Earth. Both the cryobot and the hydrobot would have to undergo some form of extreme sterilization to prevent detection of Earth organisms instead of native life and to prevent contamination of the subsurface ocean. This suggested approach has not yet reached a formal conceptual planning stage.

== Habitability ==
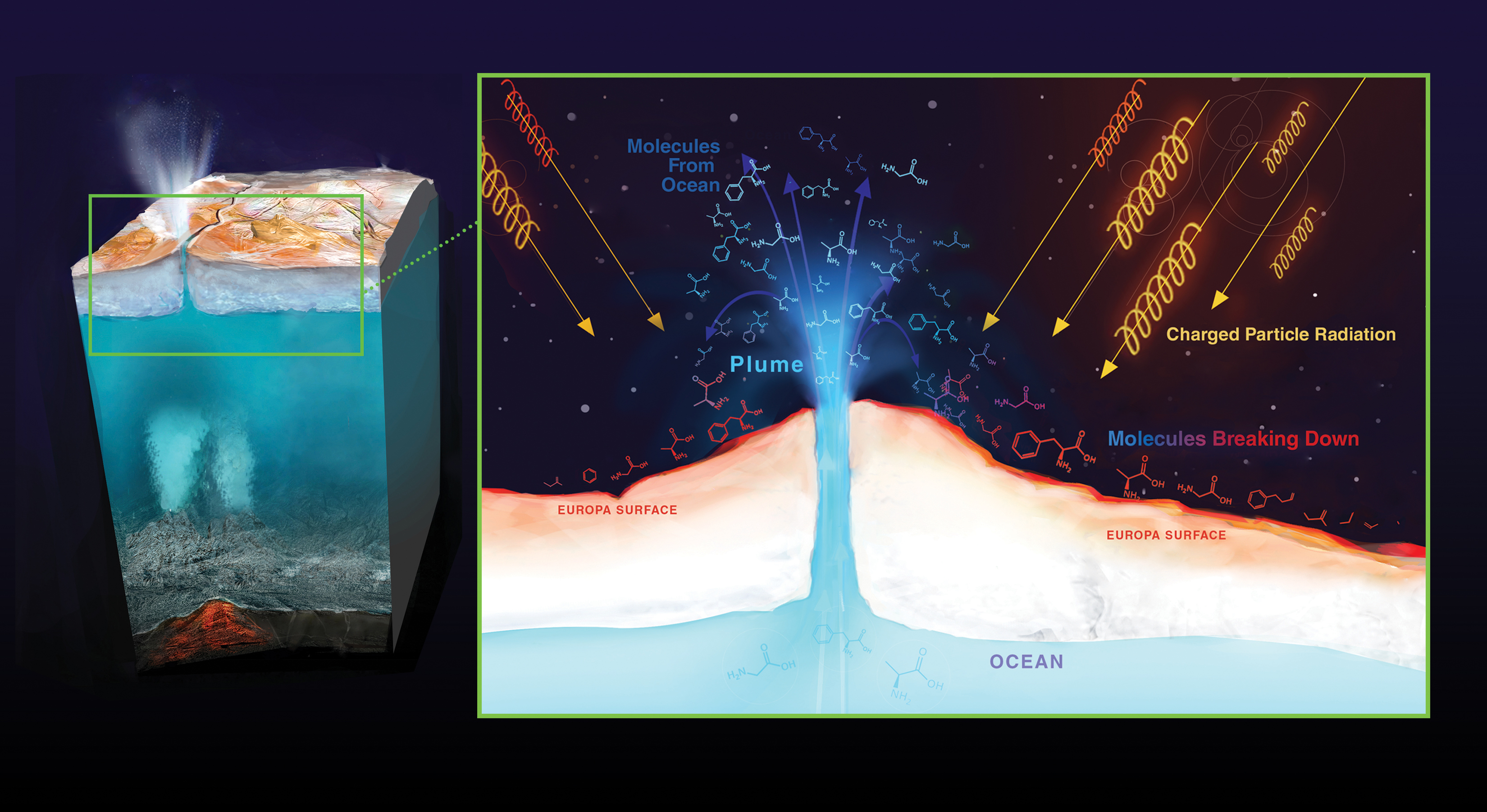
Europa – possible effect of radiation on biosignature chemicals

So far, there is no evidence that life exists on Europa, but the moon has emerged as one of the most likely locations in the Solar System for potential habitability. Life could exist in its under-ice ocean, perhaps in an environment similar to Earth's deep-ocean hydrothermal vents. Even if Europa lacks volcanic hydrothermal activity, a 2016 NASA study found that Earth-like levels of hydrogen and oxygen could be produced through processes related to serpentinization and ice-derived oxidants, which do not directly involve volcanism. In 2015, scientists announced that salt from a subsurface ocean may likely be coating some geological features on Europa, suggesting that the ocean is interacting with the seafloor. This may be important in determining if Europa could be habitable. The likely presence of liquid water in contact with Europa's rocky mantle has spurred calls to send a probe there.

The energy provided by tidal forces drives active geological processes within Europa's interior, just as they do to a far more obvious degree on its sister moon Io. Although Europa, like the Earth, may possess an internal energy source from radioactive decay, the energy generated by tidal flexing would be several orders of magnitude greater than any radiological source. Life on Europa could exist clustered around hydrothermal vents on the ocean floor, or below the ocean floor, where endoliths are known to inhabit on Earth. Alternatively, it could exist clinging to the lower surface of Europa's ice layer, much like algae and bacteria in Earth's polar regions, or float freely in Europa's ocean. Should Europa's oceans be too cold, biological processes similar to those known on Earth could not occur; too salty, only extreme halophiles could survive in that environment. In 2010, a model proposed by Richard Greenberg of the University of Arizona proposed that irradiation of ice on Europa's surface could saturate its crust with oxygen and peroxide, which could then be transported by tectonic processes into the interior ocean. Such a process could render Europa's ocean as oxygenated as our own within just 12 million years, allowing the existence of complex, multicellular lifeforms.

Evidence suggests the existence of lakes of liquid water entirely encased in Europa's icy outer shell and distinct from a liquid ocean thought to exist farther down beneath the ice shell, as well as pockets of water that form M-shaped ice ridges when the water freezes on the surface – as in Greenland. If confirmed, the lakes and pockets of water could be yet another potential habitat for life. Evidence suggests that hydrogen peroxide is abundant across much of the surface of Europa. Because hydrogen peroxide decays into oxygen and water when combined with liquid water, the authors argue that it could be an important energy supply for simple life forms. Nonetheless, on 4 March 2024, astronomers reported that the surface of Europa may have much less oxygen than previously inferred.

Modern habitability models for Europa were updated in 2026 to reflect a "geologically quiet" seafloor. The lack of active faulting suggests that high-energy hydrothermal systems, such as "black smokers," are unlikely to exist on Europa today. While low-temperature fluid flow may still occur within the upper seafloor, the reduced rate of water–rock interaction would significantly limit the chemical energy and redox couples available to support chemoautotrophic life. Researchers have suggested that while Europa may have been more geologically active in the past due to higher orbital eccentricity, it may currently lack the tectonic "engine" necessary to sustain a robust biosphere. Researchers suggested that any processes able to sustain habitable conditions at the Europan seafloor today must therefore be independent of ongoing tectonic activity.

Clay-like minerals (specifically, phyllosilicates), often associated with organic matter on Earth, have been detected on the icy crust of Europa. The presence of the minerals may have been the result of a collision with an asteroid or comet. Some scientists have speculated that life on Earth could have been blasted into space by asteroid collisions and arrived on the moons of Jupiter in a process called lithopanspermia.

Further research concluded that there is a probable way that the Europa's icy shelf could sustain potential habitability by a viscous dripping process. The paper concluded that the Lithospheric drips from Europa's shelf to its subsurface ocean could provide enough material for a potentially sustainable habitability.

=== Far future ===
Most stars like the Sun at the end of their main sequence phase of their life will evolve into a red giant branch star. Then when they die they will shed their outer layers to become a white dwarf star. When the Sun goes through this in around 5 billion years, Europa will be drastically affected. The fate of Europa will be largely the same with the other Galilean moons of Jupiter and some of the moons of Saturn.

When the habitable zone (HZ) of the Sun reaches to Europa, the heat from the red giant Sun will cause the ice on Europa to sublimate or melt, forming a temporary global ocean. The side of Europa facing Jupiter will sublimate much more than the side facing away from Jupiter. This will cause Europa to gain a tenuous atmosphere made of water vapor which will last for about 0.2 billion years until the habitable zone extends beyond Europa. This water will then be blasted away into space. However, while Europa still has its ocean, there is a possibility for life to blossom or emerge in that limited time, since life on Earth took around a couple hundred million years to evolve.

== See also ==
- Galilean moons (the four largest moons of Jupiter)
  - Callisto
  - Europa
  - Ganymede
  - Io
- Jupiter's moons in fiction
- List of craters on Europa
- List of geological features on Europa
- List of lineae on Europa
- Snowball Earth hypothesis
- Ocean world
- Extraterrestrial water
