= Saint-Brès =

Saint-Brès is the name or part of the name of several communes in France:

- Saint-Brès, in the Gard department
- Saint-Brès, in the Gers department
- Saint-Brès, in the Hérault department
