= Małgorzata Breś =

Polish fencer (born 1959)

Personal information
- Born: 31 December 1959 (age 66) Lublin, Poland

Sport
- Sport: Fencing

Małgorzata Breś (born 31 December 1959) is a Polish fencer. She competed in the women's team foil event at the 1988 Summer Olympics in Seoul. Her country, Poland, ranked 10th in the teams competing. She competed in 11 matches with her team.
