= Pwyll (crater) =

Impact crater on Europa

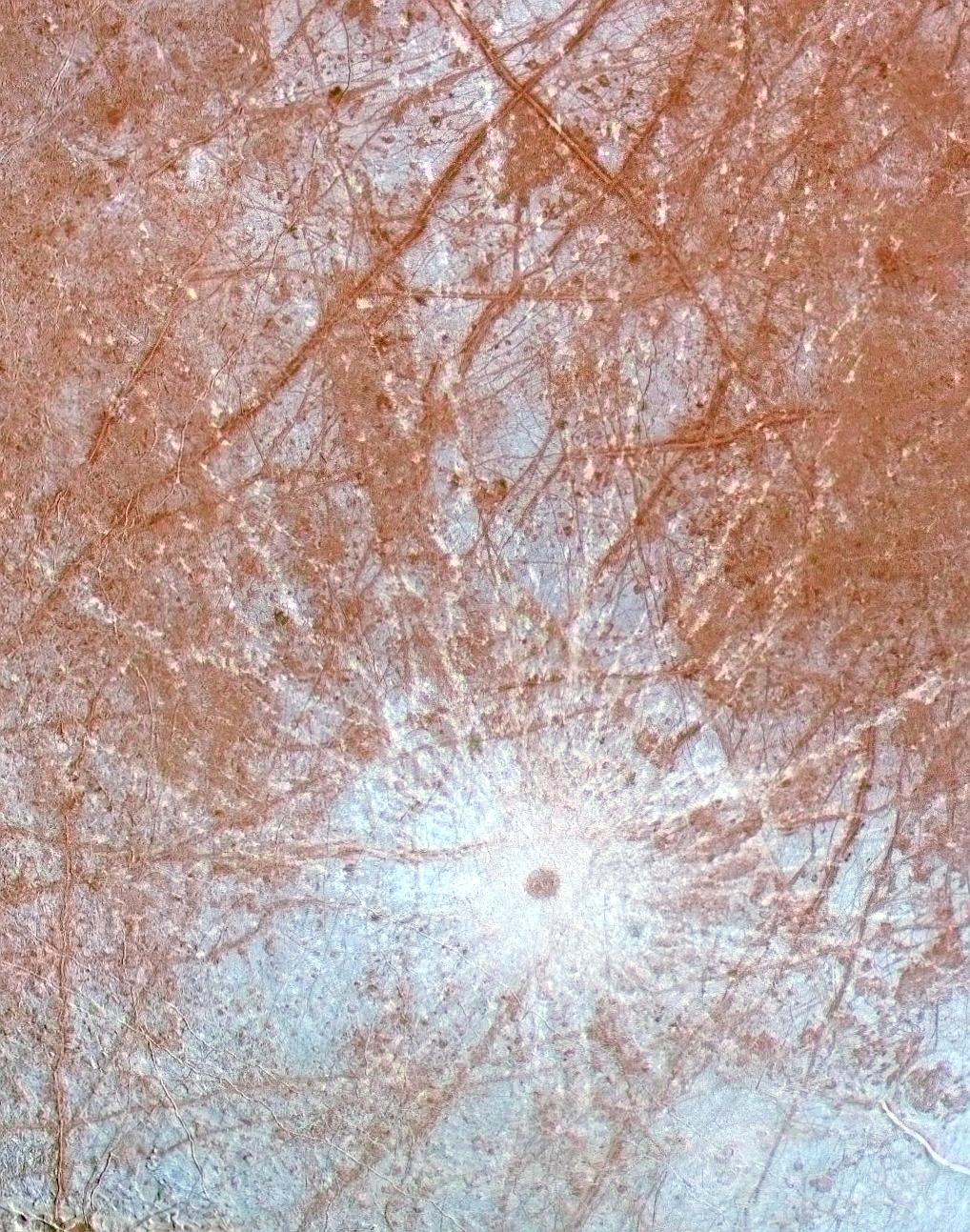
- A combination of color and high resolution black and white data from NASA's Galileo spacecraft was used to produce this view looking down on Pwyll crater with the sun illuminating the scene from the right. The Conamara Chaos region is just below the "X" formed by lineae near the top.
- Feature type: Impact crater
- Location: Europa
- Coordinates: 25.2°S 271.4°W
- Diameter: 45 km
- Eponym: Pwyll of Welsh mythology

Pwyll (Welsh pronunciation: [pʊ̯iɬ]) is an impact crater on the surface of Jupiter's moon Europa. It is thought to be one of the youngest features on the moon. The crater was first observed from Voyager images in 1986, and the name was officially recognized by the IAU in 1997, after Pwyll of Welsh mythology.

== Description ==
Pwyll crater is estimated to be 18 million years old or younger. Its visible dark central region is about 25 kilometres (16 mi) in diameter, with several small peaks, and a central peak rising to about 600 m. Dark material in the center of the crater was exposed as a result of the impact, and may have been excavated from a depth of 1 km.

Ejected bright material extends outward from Pwyll in rays that extend as far as 1000 km, covering the darker reddish surface of Europa. The bright white color suggests a composition of water ice particles. In addition to the white rays, the impact also produced a multitude of smaller secondary craters, which are largest near the center of each ray, and close to the central crater.

== See also ==
- List of craters on Europa
- List of geological features on Europa
