= Bress =

Bress is a surname. Notable people with the surname include:

- Brian Bress (born 1975), American video artist
- Daniel Bress (born 1979), American judge
- David G. Bress (1908–1976), American lawyer
- Eric Bress, American screenwriter, film director and producer

== See also ==
- Bres
