= List of geological features on Europa =

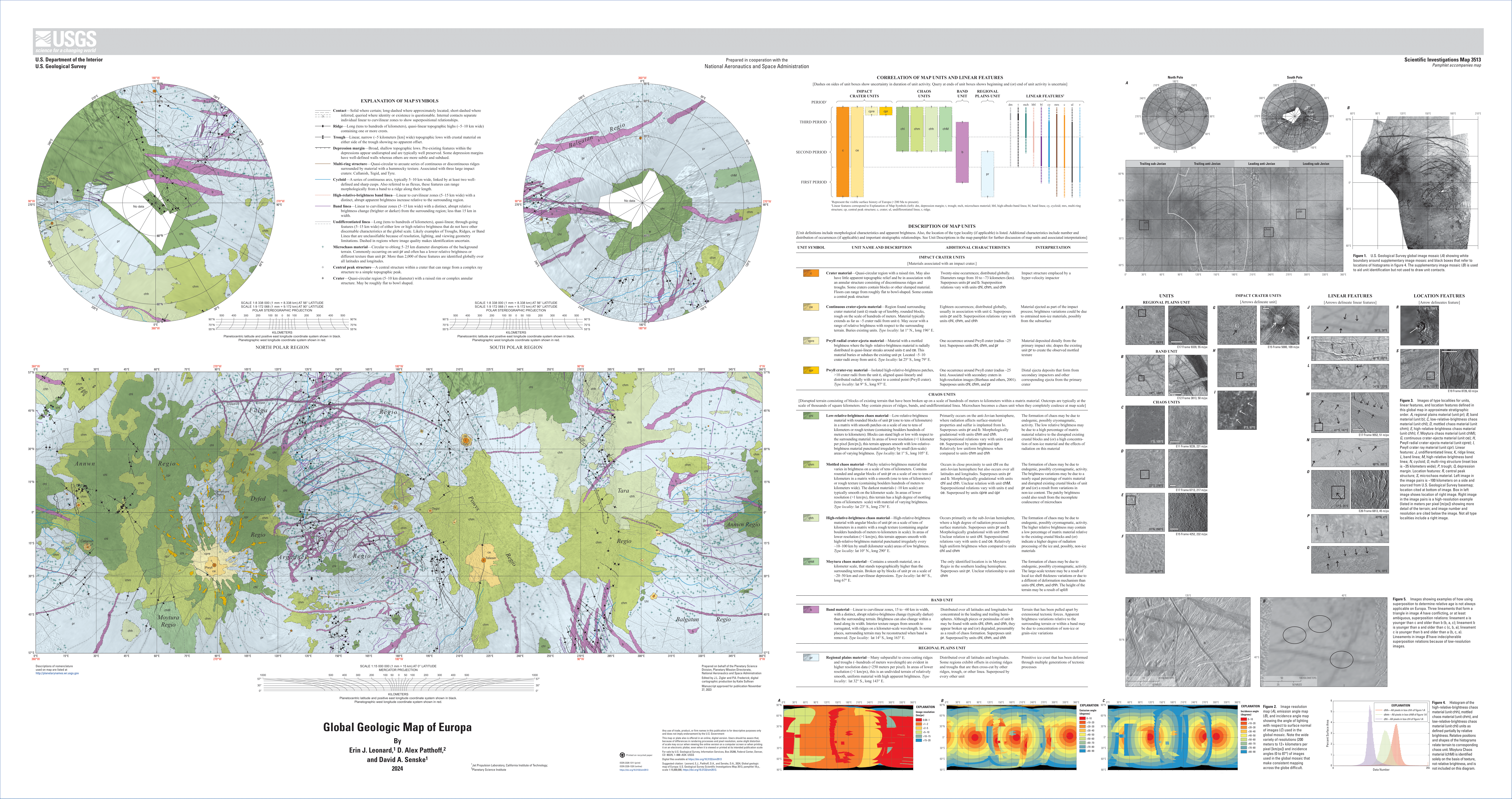
A new version geological map of Europa (March 8, 2024).

This is a list of named geological features on Europa, a moon of the planet Jupiter. Craters and lineae are listed on separate pages: list of craters on Europa and list of lineae on Europa.

== Cavi ==
Cavi are irregular steep-sided depressions that do not seem to be impact craters.

| Cavus | Pronounced | Coordinates | Diameter (km) | Approval Date | Named After | Refs |
|---|---|---|---|---|---|---|
| Moyle Cavus | /ˈmɔɪl/ | 25°S 168°W | 145 | 2019 | Moyle, a cold sea where the children of Lir (Llyr) spent three hundred years as swans | WGPSN |

== Chaos ==
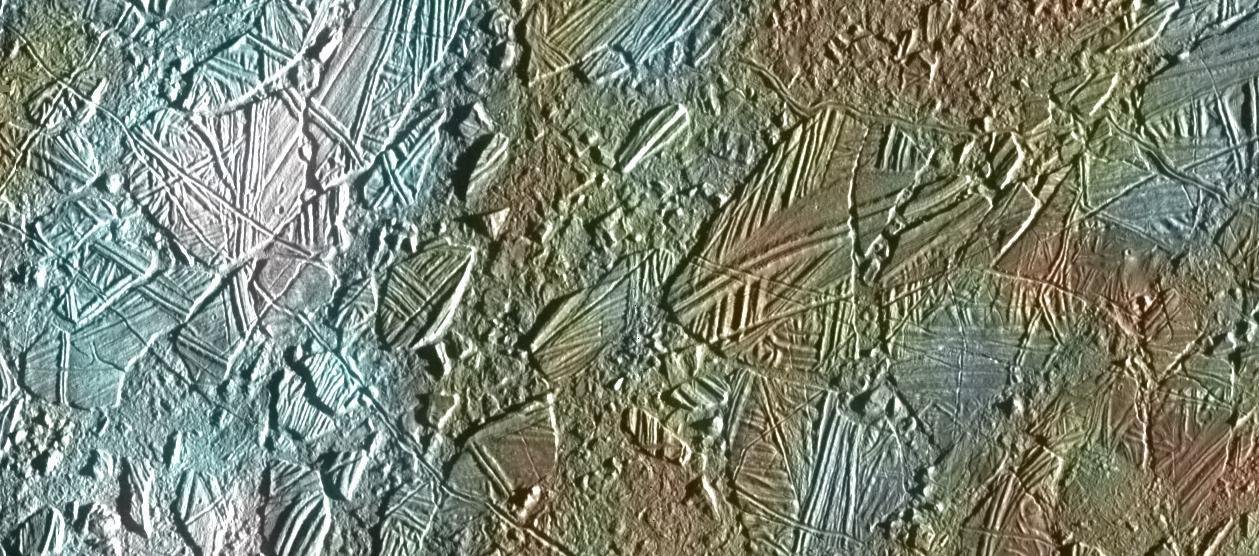
Enhanced color partial view of Conamara Chaos

On Europa, regions of chaotic terrain are named after places in Celtic mythology.

| Chaos | Pronounced | Coordinates | Diameter (km) | Approval Date | Named After | Refs |
|---|---|---|---|---|---|---|
| Arran Chaos | /ˈærən/ | 13.4°N 168°W | 26 | 2007 | Isle of Arran, Scotland | WGPSN |
| Conamara Chaos | /kɒnəˈmɛərə/ | 9.7°N 272.7°W | 143.7 | 1997 | Connemara, Ireland | WGPSN |
| Murias Chaos | | 22.4°N 83.8°W | 116 | 2003 | Murias | WGPSN |
| Narberth Chaos | | 26°S 273°W | 20 | 2007 | Narberth, Wales | WGPSN |
| Rathmore Chaos | | 25.4°N 75°W | 57 | 2007 | Rathmore, Ireland | WGPSN |

== Flexūs ==
A flexus is a low, curved ridge with a scalloped pattern. Europan flexūs are named after the places visited by Europa during her journey with Zeus who was in the form of a bull.

| Flexus | Pronounced | Coordinates | Diameter (km) | Approval Date | Named After | Refs |
|---|---|---|---|---|---|---|
| Cilicia Flexus | /sɪˈlɪʃiə/ | 59.5°S 171.7°W | 1312 | 1979 | Cilicia | WGPSN |
| Delphi Flexus | /ˈdɛlfaɪ/ | 68.2°S 174.1°W | 793 | 1985 | Delphi | WGPSN |
| Gortyna Flexus | /ɡɔːrˈtaɪnə/ | 42.1°S 144.6°W | 940 | 1979 | Gortȳna | WGPSN |
| Phocis Flexus | /ˈfoʊsɪs/ | 44.5°S 198.4°W | 242 | 1985 | Phocis | WGPSN |
| Sidon Flexus | /ˈsaɪdən/ | 66.4°S 183.4°W | 1133 | 1979 | Sidon | WGPSN |

== Fossae ==
Fossae are named after ancient Celtic ancient stone rows.

| Fossa | Pronounced | Coordinates | Diameter (km) | Approval Date | Named After | Refs |
|---|---|---|---|---|---|---|
| Beenalaght Fossa | | 1.2°N 82.08°W | 882 | 28 May 2019 | Beenalaght stone row, County Cork, Ireland | WGPSN |
| Eightercua Fossa | | 6.68°N 340.71°W | 407 | 28 May 2019 | Eightercua stone row, County Kerry, Ireland | WGPSN |
| Kerlescan Fossae | | 3.34°N 238.24°W | 410 | 28 May 2019 | Kerlescan stone row, Carnac, Brittany | WGPSN |
| Kermario Fossae | | 44.69°N 354.36°W | 191 | 28 May 2019 | Kermario stone row, Carnac, Brittany | WGPSN |
| Maughanasilly Fossa | | 34.24°S 155.19°W | 920 | 28 May 2019 | Maughanasilly stone row, County Cork, Ireland | WGPSN |
| Ménec Fossae | | 51.98°S 177.87°W | 33 | 28 May 2019 | Ménec stone row, Carnac, Brittany | WGPSN |

== Large ringed features ==
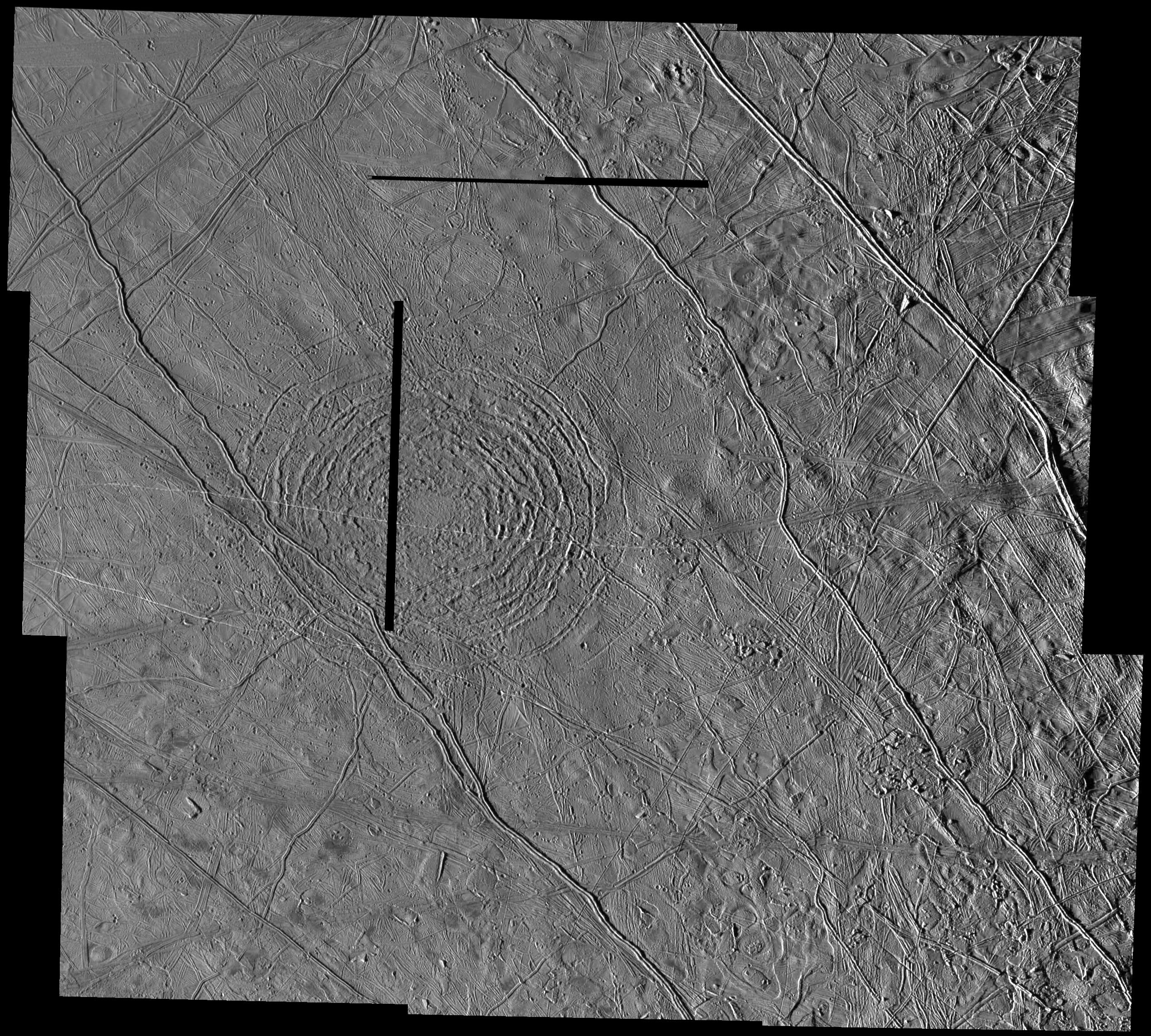
Tyre multi-ring impact structure

These impact structures are named after important locations in ancient history.

| Large Ringed Features | Pronounced | Coordinates | Diameter (km) | Approval Date | Named After | Refs |
|---|---|---|---|---|---|---|
| Callanish | | 16.7°S 334.5°W | 107 | 1997 | Callanish, Scotland | WGPSN |
| Tyre (formerly listed as a macula) | /ˈtaɪər/ | 33.6°N 146.6°W | 149 | 1997 | Tyre, Lebanon | WGPSN |

== Maculae ==
Europan maculae (dark spots) are named after locations in Greek mythology, especially in the legend of Cadmus and his search for his sister, Europa.

| Macula | Pronounced | Coordinates | Diameter (km) | Approval Date | Named After | Refs |
|---|---|---|---|---|---|---|
| Boeotia Macula | /biːˈoʊʃiə/ | 53.6°S 166.8°W | 30 | 1997 | Boeotia | WGPSN |
| Castalia Macula | /kəˈsteɪliə/ | 1.6°S 225.7°W | 35 | 2003 | Castalia | WGPSN |
| Cyclades Macula | /ˈsɪklədiːz/ | 62.5°S 191.3°W | 107 | 1997 | Cyclades | WGPSN |
| Thera Macula | /ˈθɪərə/ | 46.7°S 181.2°W | 95 | 1979 | Thera | WGPSN |
| Thrace Macula | /ˈθreɪs/ | 45.9°S 172.1°W | 180.2 | 1979 | Thrace | WGPSN |

== Mensae ==
| Mensa | Coordinates | Diameter (km) | Approval Date | Named After | Refs |
|---|---|---|---|---|---|
| Belenos Mensa | 42.75°N 75.08°W | 34 | 2019 | Belenos, Italian Celtic sun god | WGPSN |
| Borvo Mensa | 0.45°S 225.31°W | 49.72 | 2019 | Borvo, Gallic god of healing | WGPSN |
| Grannus Mensa | 2.51°S 225.8°W | 42 | 2019 | Grannus, Romano-Celtic god of healing | WGPSN |

== Quadrangles ==
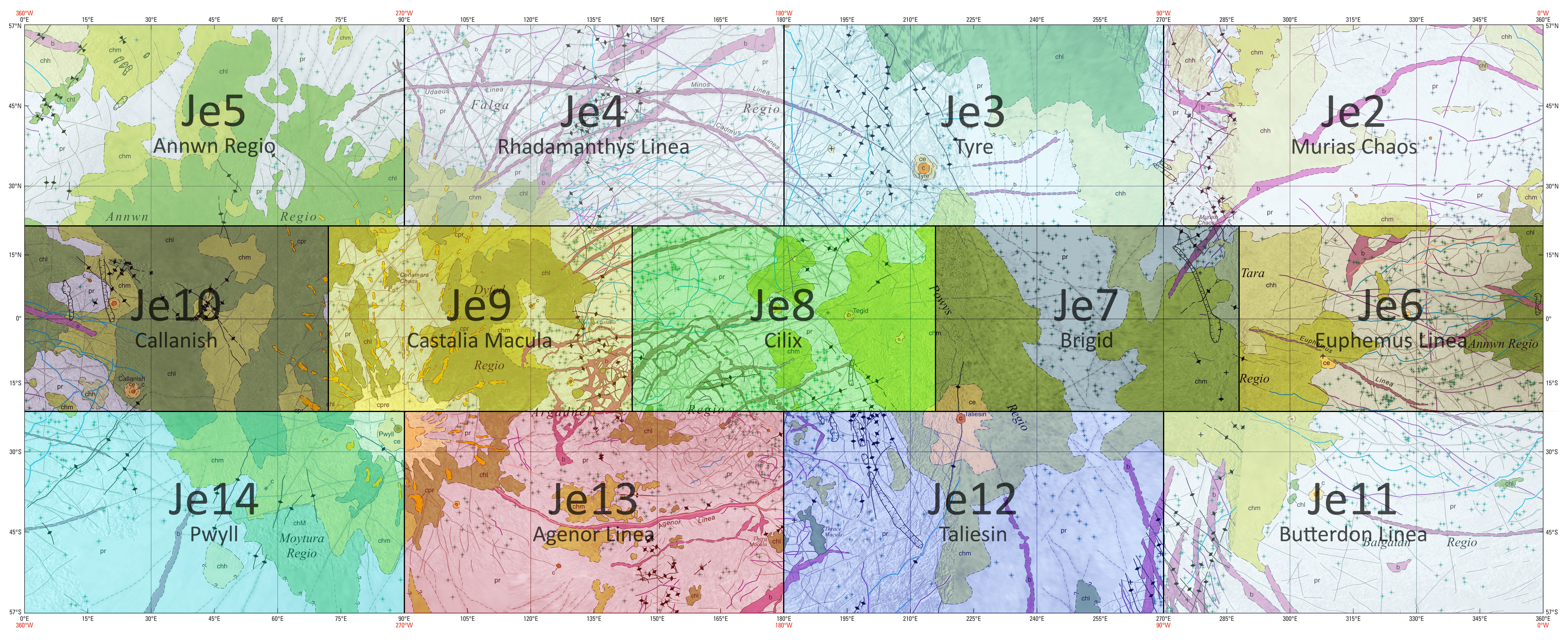
A Mercator projection of the arrangement of the quadrangles on Europa, except at the poles

The surface of Europa has been divided into 15 quadrangles or sections.

| Name | Number | Latitude | Longitude | Ref |
|---|---|---|---|---|
| Ogma | Je1 | 65-90° N | 0-360° W | |
| Murias Chaos | Je2 | 21-66° N | 0-90° W | |
| Tyre | Je3 | 21-66° N | 90-180° W | |
| Rhadamanthys Linea | Je4 | 21-66° N | 180-270° W | |
| Annwn Regio | Je5 | 21-66° N | 270-360° W | |
| Euphemus Linea | Je6 | 22° N-22° S | 0-72° W | |
| Brigid | Je7 | 22° N-22° S | 72-144° W | |
| Cilix | Je8 | 22° N-22° S | 144-216° W | |
| Castalia Macula | Je9 | 22° N-22° S | 216-288° W | |
| Callanish | Je10 | 22° N-22° S | 288-360° W | |
| Butterdon Linea | Je11 | 21-66° S | 0-90° W | |
| Taliesin | Je12 | 21-66° S | 90-180° W | |
| Agenor Linea | Je13 | 21-66° S | 180-270° W | |
| Pwyll | Je14 | 21-66° S | 270-360° W | |
| Sidon Flexus | Je15 | 65-90° S | 0-360° W | |

== Regiones ==
Europan regiones (regions) are named after locations in Celtic mythology.

| Regio | Pronounced | Coordinates | Diameter (km) | Approval Date | Named After | Refs |
|---|---|---|---|---|---|---|
| Annwn Regio | /ˈænuːn/ | 20°N 320°W | 2300 | 11 May 2007 | Annwn, Welsh otherworld | WGPSN |
| Argadnel Regio | | 14.6°S 208.5°W | 1900 | 2003 | Argadnel, Celtic paradise | WGPSN |
| Balgatan Regio | | 50°S 30°W | 2500 | 11 May 2007 | Balgatan Pass from Celtic mythology | WGPSN |
| Dyfed Regio | /ˈdʌvɪd/ | 10°N 250°W | 1750 | 11 May 2007 | Kingdom of Dyfed | WGPSN |
| Falga Regio | | 30°N 210°W | 2500 | 11 May 2007 | Inis Fer Falga, Irish legendary island | WGPSN |
| Moytura Regio | | 50°S 294.3°W | 483 | 1997 | Magh Tuiredh, Irish battle site | WGPSN |
| Powys Regio | /ˈpoʊɪs/ | 0°N 145°W | 2000 | 11 May 2007 | Kingdom of Powys | WGPSN |
| Tara Regio | /ˈtærə/ | 10°S 75°W | 1780 | 11 May 2007 | Hill of Tara, Ireland | WGPSN |
