= Tyre (Europa) =

Multi-ring crater on Europa

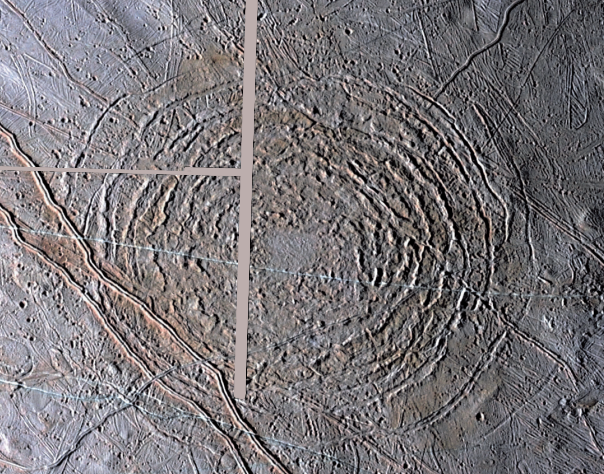
- A mosaic image of Tyre, taken by the Galileo space probe on 29 March 1998.
- Feature type: Multiring Crater
- Coordinates: 33.60°N 146.60°W
- Diameter: 149 km (93 mi)
- Eponym: Tyre, Lebanon

Tyre (formerly called Tyre Macula) is a large, multiring impact crater structure on Jupiter's fourth largest moon Europa.

== Naming ==
Tyre is named after a city in Lebanon, which has existed since ancient times. According to Greek mythology, this city was the home of the ancient Phoenician princess Europa, with whom Zeus (the Greek counterpart of the Roman god Jupiter) fell in love and whom he abducted in the form of a bull. In ancient times, Tyre was a major seaport city of the Phoenician seafarers.

According to the International Astronomical Union, all surface features and craters on Europa are to be named after figures and places that are either related to the mythological princess Europa or from Celtic mythology. Tyre belongs to the former category.

The name was approved by the IAU in 1997.

== Location ==
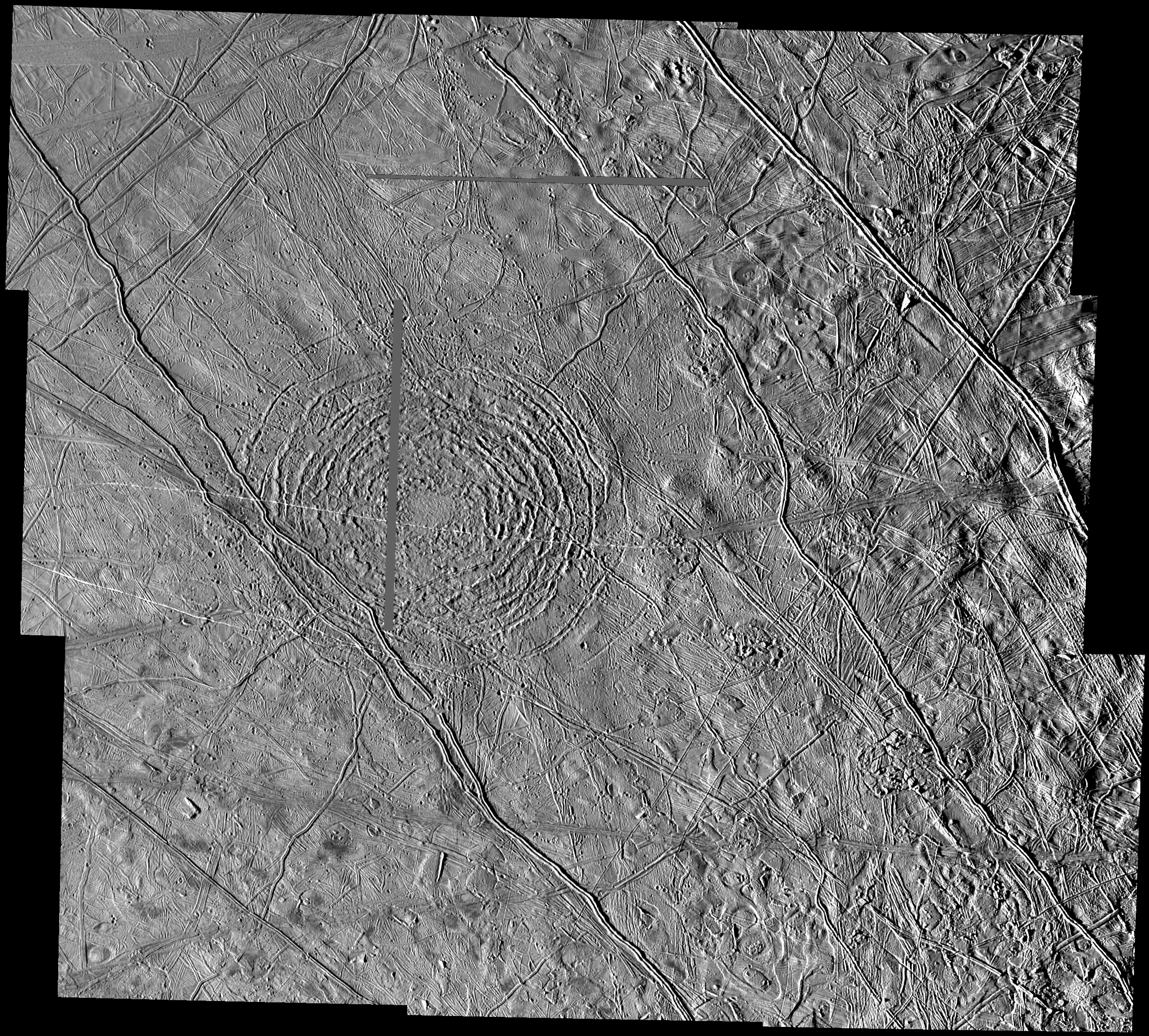
Tyre and its surrounding regions, taken by Galileo in March 1998.

Tyre is located in the mid-latitude northern hemisphere of Europa. It is surrounded on all sides by several crisscrossing linea terrains, including Drumskinny Linea, Pelagon Linea, Minos Linea and Harmonia Linea. Many of the lines and cracks of these lineae intersect at Tyre's location. To the west of Tyre is the extensive Falga Regio, while to the south is Powys Regio.

Tyre is located near the middle of the Tyre quadrangle (or section) of Europa's surface. (designated Je3). This quadrangle is named after Tyre.

Like all major moons in the Solar System, Europa is orbiting Jupiter in a synchronous rotation which is why one hemisphere Europa always faces Europa, while the other side never does. Tyre is located on the anti-Jovian hemisphere of Europa (the side of Europa that never faces Jupiter), therefore, an observer standing on Tyre will never see Jupiter in the sky. (Note: For moons in synchronous rotation, such as Europa, 0° longitude corresponds to the part of the surface that always faces Jupiter. Regions between 90° W to 180° W to 270° W longitude never face the moon's parent planet.)

== Morphology ==
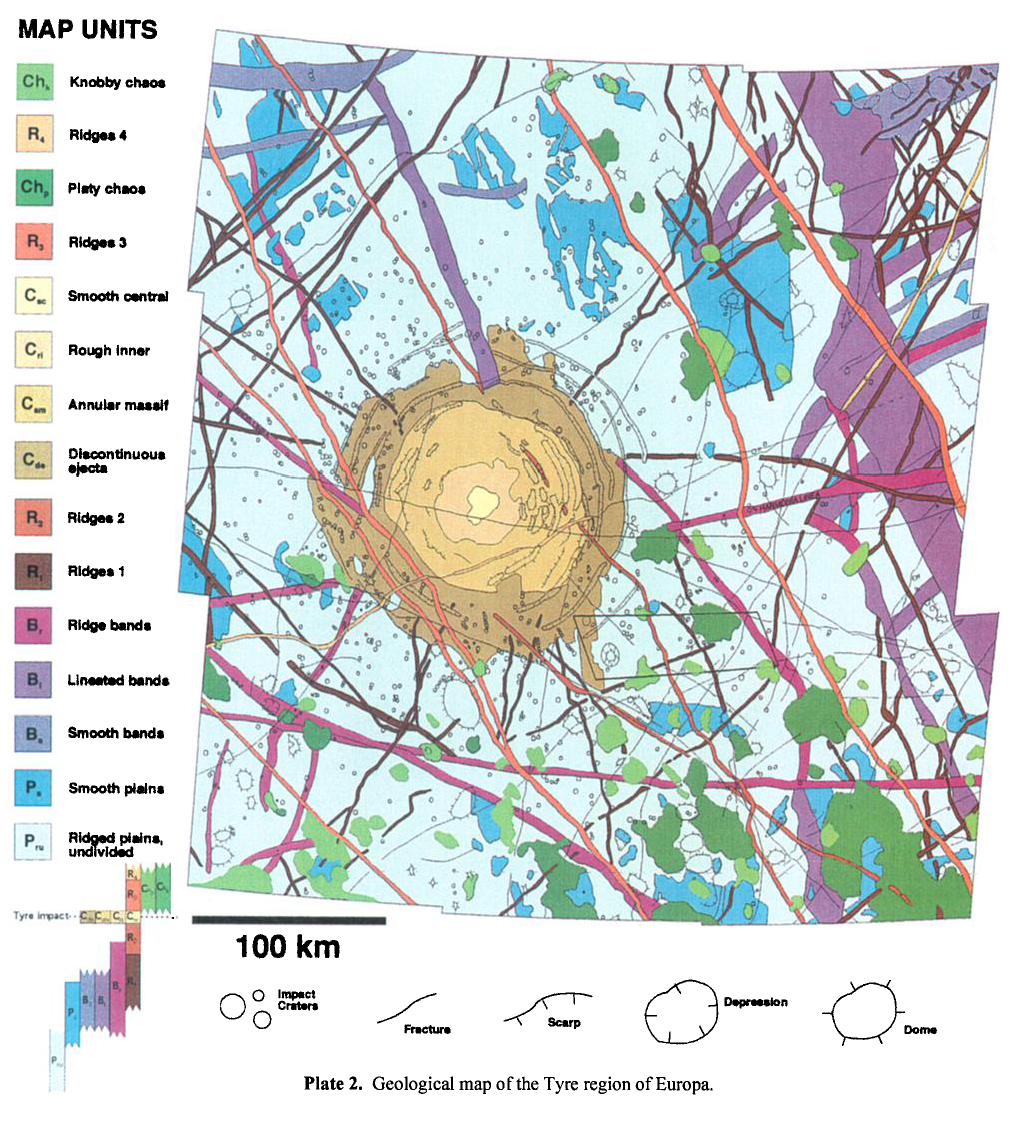
A geographic map of Tyre crater.

The main, central part of Tyre is only 40 km (25 mi), but the entire multiring structure of the crater is 149 km (93 mi) wide. Tyre exhibits multiple concentric rings—where typically five to seven are readily identifiable—formed by a series of ridges and troughs. It is among the few known impact structures on Europa exhibiting concentric ring morphology, resembling a “bulls-eye.” This feature may indicate the presence of subsurface fluid material, potentially liquid water, at the time of formation. Several ridges within Tyre also appear to have been partially obliterated or modified by the impact process.

At the center of Tyre lies a flat, high-albedo, smoothly textured deposit approximately 15 km (9.3 mi)–20 km (12 mi) across, situated within a shallow, scarp-bounded depression. This material is interpreted as impact melt and/or fluidized material emplaced from a source beneath the brittle crust. Surrounding this central unit is a 45 km (28 mi)-diameter inner deposit. This rougher unit is thought to consist of impact melt mixed with fragmented target material. Beyond it, the encircling deposits exhibit relatively smoother surfaces where they have not been disrupted by later tectonic activity, and largely correspond to the darker, redder annular deposits observed around the structure.

In the past, planetary scientists debated whether Tyre was an impact crater because of its unusual characteristics. However, it is now strongly believed that Tyre is, in fact, a true impact structure formed by an asteroid or comet.

Nonetheless, Tyre does not resemble a “classic” impact crater that formed on solid water ice crusts like those found in elsewhere in Europa and other icy moons. This is because unlike smaller craters such as Pwyll or Manannán, Tyre lacks a sharp raised rim, a bowl-shaped depression and a central peak. Instead, Tyre shows flat topography, concentric rings, and annular massifs. These traits are inconsistent with impact into a purely solid, brittle water ice shell like that of Europa's crust. Instead, Tyre resembles Callanish. Because Callanish was interpreted as having formed over mechanically very weak material, it is most likely that Tyre also formed in the same way.

A few of Tyre's possible secondary craters remain visible, but most have already been crosscut by flowing and fracturing cracks resulting from geological activity beneath the moon's surface.

== Formation ==
Analyses of Tyre's ejecta indicate that it behaved like a fluid during its formation, suggesting that the ejecta were emplaced while in a fluidized or slurry-like state rather than as dry, solid ballistic debris. There is a possibility that, at the time of impact, the subsurface beneath Tyre was in a low-viscosity state. Models suggest that during the formation of Tyre, the thickness of Europa's icy crust at the impact site was approximately 10 km (6.2 mi), indicating that the crust was thinner in the past than it is today. The crust was also at that time floating atop a liquid water ocean, probably warm and briny, with zones of convecting ice. This also indicates that Europa's surface was likely still geologically active when Tyre was formed and may have remained active after the impact event.

The existence of craters such as Tyre strongly suggests that Europa's crust is multi-layered and rheologically complex, meaning near the surface of Europa, its crust can behave in a brittle matter, but at depths of several kilometers, the crust can behave plastically or fluidly.

Tyre has been deformed and fractured in several locations by the stretching and faulting of Europa's surface due to tectonic activity. Two ridges, in particular, are especially prominent, sharply cutting across the southern portion of the crater. Although Tyre is a relatively young crater, these two ridges are even younger and they formed after the impact event. Similar deformation and fracturing of craters also occurs on Ganymede, as observed at Saltu and Nefertum craters.

== Surface ==
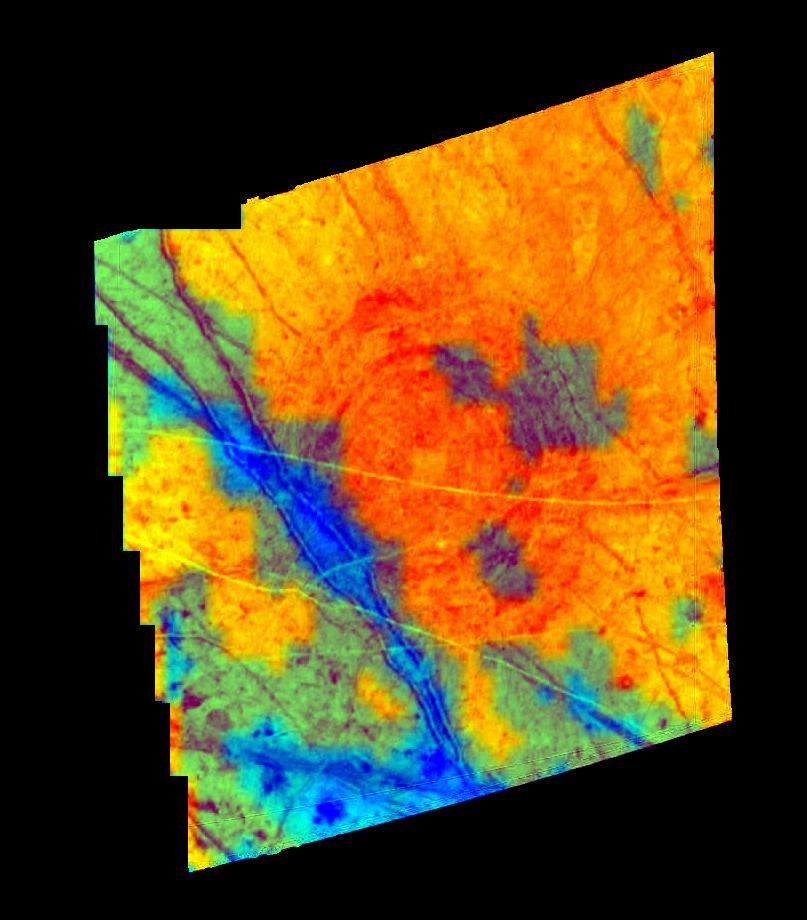
A geologic map showing the composition of the surface of Tyre and its surroundings.

In April 1997, the Galileo space probe used its Solid State Imaging (SSI) camera and the Near Infrared Mapping Spectrometer (NIMS) to study the composition of Tyre and its surrounding region.

The blue-colored areas in the image indicate regions with elevated concentrations of mineral salts, similar in composition to those found on the floor of Death Valley, California. In contrast, the yellow-orange regions represent areas with a high surface abundance of water ice. The center of the impact crater appears to have a surface composed of coarse-grained ice

Data suggest that the dark material on Europa's surface around Tyre represents a mixture of hydrated saline minerals, dominated by sulfate salts, which appear white in visible light and are mixed with an unknown dark reddish material. In high-resolution SSI images, the dark material is found almost exclusively on or beneath Sun-facing slopes of craters, massifs, ridges, and ice rafts. This distribution strongly suggests a sublimation lag deposit origin, or alternatively, the preferential removal of bright frost—where water ice is selectively volatilized on Sun-facing slopes, concentrating the salts and darker material to produce a low-visible-albedo deposit. These observations are consistent with the studies of other scientists such as Prockter et al. (1998), indicating that ice sublimation is a potentially important process modifying the surfaces of Europa and its sister satellite, Ganymede

== Exploration ==
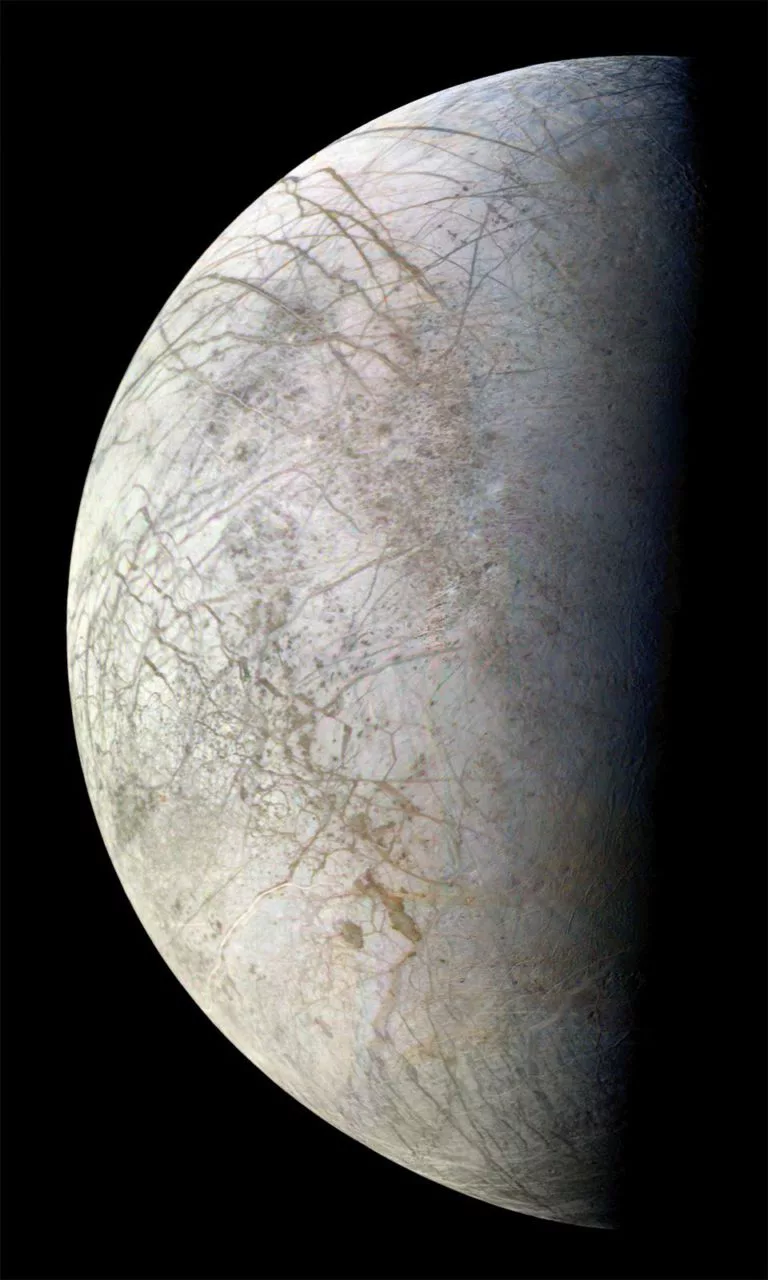
An enhanced image of Europa, taken by Voyager 2 during its closest approach to the moon in July 1979. Tyre is the barely visible pale orange spot near the top of the moon, close to the terminator.

Voyager 1 and Voyager 2 both explored Europa during their flybys of the Jovian system in March 1979 and July 1979, respectively. However, only Voyager 2 imaged the hemisphere of Europa where Tyre is located. Voyager 2's closest approach to Europa was 200,000 km (120,000 mi), which is more than three times closer than Voyager 1's closest approach, allowing it to obtain more detailed views of the moon. Tyre was close to the terminator of Europa during Voyager 2's closest approach.

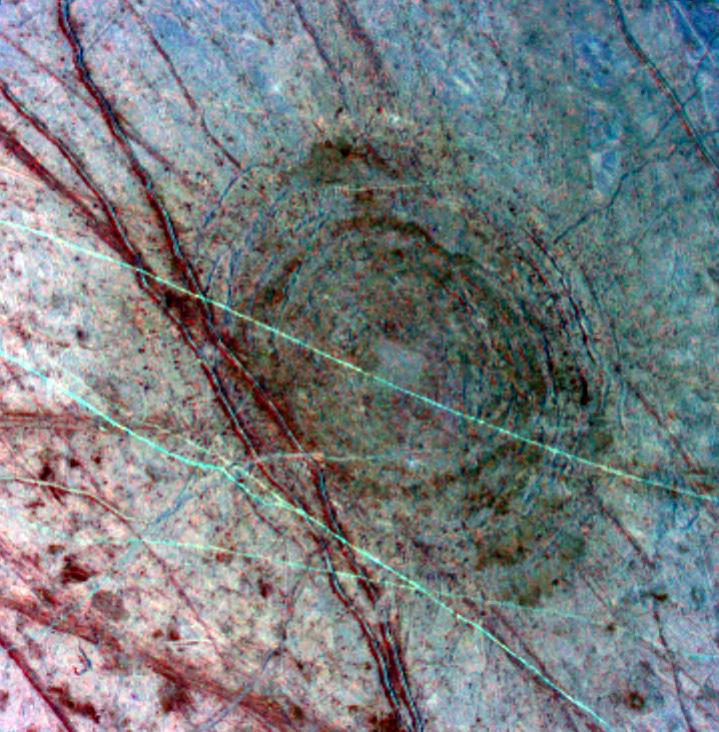
A false color image of Tyre, taken by Galileo in April 1997.

Galileo was the first probe to capture high-resolution images of Tyre as it orbited around Jupiter between December 1995 and September 2003. Its close flybys of Europa in April 1997 and March 1998 provided the highest-resolution images of Tyre available at the time. As of 2026, Galileo's imagery remains the clearest available of Tyre and its surrounding regions.

=== Future Missions ===
Two space probes are currently en route to Europa. The first is NASA's Europa Clipper mission, which is scheduled to arrive at Jupiter in April 2030. The spacecraft will orbit Jupiter on a trajectory that allows it to conduct at least 49 close flybys of Europa, approaching to within 25 km (16 mi) of the moon's surface. Europa Clipper carries an ice-penetrating radar capable of probing Europa's ice shell, enabling investigations of both the surface features of Tyre and the subsurface structure beneath the crater. This information will provide planetary scientists with insights into the composition of Europa's subsurface and the response of its ice shell to meteoroid impacts. Large impacts like Tyre can probe deep into Europa's ice shell, potentially revealing something about the moon's internal structure.

The second probe is European Space Agency's (ESA) Jupiter Icy Moons Explorer (Juice), which will arrive at Jupiter in July 2031. Juice will fly by Europa only twice, but it will help supplement the data collected by Europa Clipper.

== See also ==
- List of geological features on Europa
- List of quadrangles on Europa
- List of craters on Europa
- List of lineae on Europa
