= Rhadamanthus (disambiguation) =

Rhadamanthus was a just ruler in Greek mythology, son of Zeus and Europa.

Rhadamanthus may also refer to:

- 38083 Rhadamanthus, a trans-Neptunian object
- Rhadamanthys Linea, a line feature on Jupiter's moon Europa
- Rhadamanthus, a genus of plants included in the genus Drimia
- Rhadamanthus (horse), a British Thoroughbred racehorse
