= List of lineae on Europa =

This is a list of lineae on Europa. Most Europan lineae are named after characters and places in the legends of Cadmus and Europa; others are named after important megalithic stone rows built by the Neolithic peoples of Britain and France.

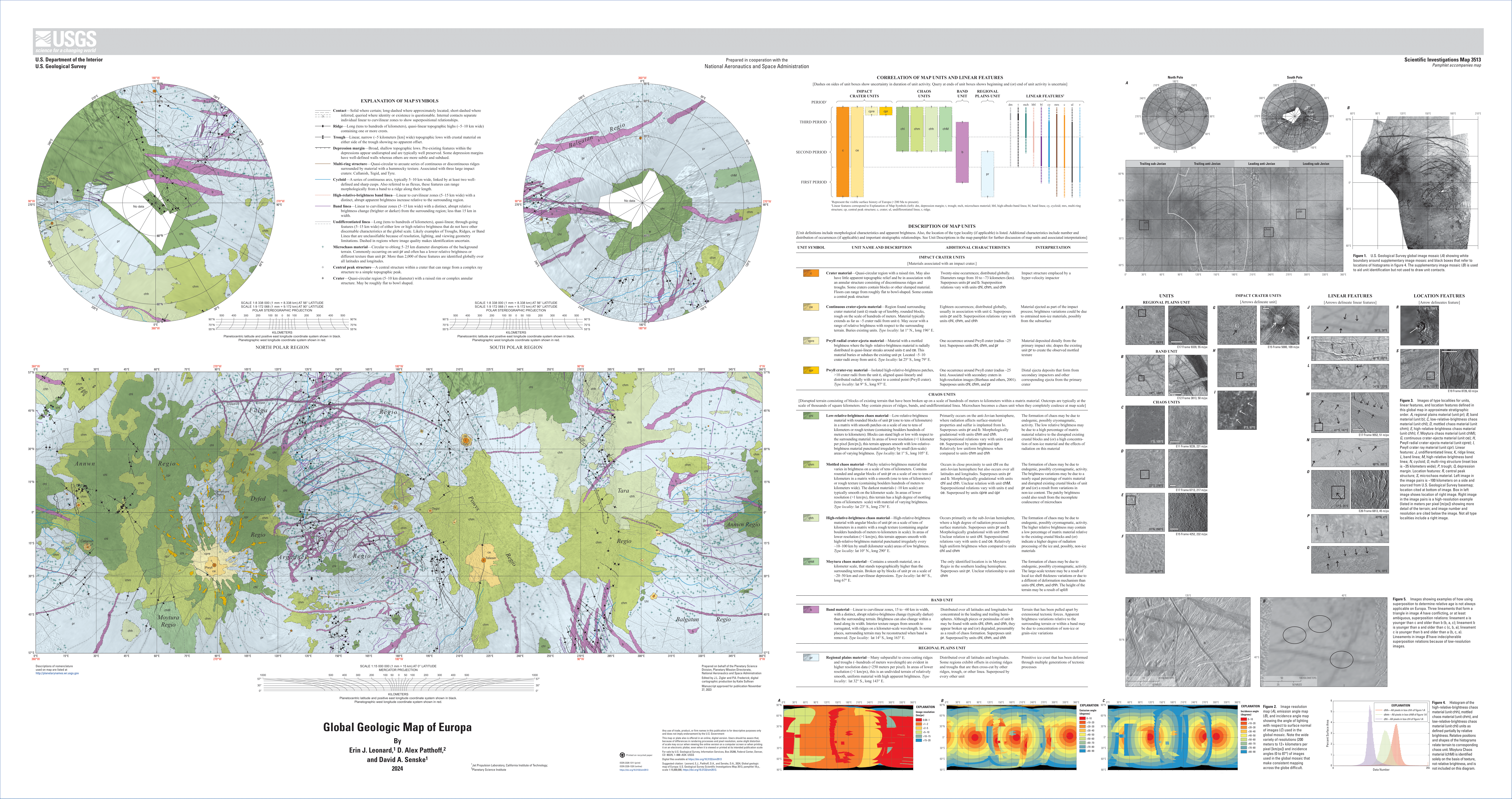
A new version geological map of Europa (March 8, 2024).

See also the list of craters on Europa and list of geological features on Europa.

Linea	Pronounced	Named after
Adonis Linea	/əˈdoʊnɪs/	Adonis
Agave Linea	/əˈɡeɪviː/	Agave
Agenor Linea	/əˈdʒiːnɔːr/	Agenor
Alphesiboea Linea	/ˌælfɪsɪˈbiːə/	Alphesiboea
Androgeos Linea	/ænˈdrɒdʒiːɒs/	Androgeus
Argiope Linea	/ɑːrˈdʒaɪəpiː/	Argiope (Telephassa)
Asterius Linea	/əˈstɪəriəs/	Asterius
Astypalaea Linea	/ˌæstɪpəˈliːə/	Astypalaea
Autonoë Linea	/ɔːˈtɒnoʊiː/	Autonoë
Belus Linea	/ˈbiːləs/	Belus the Egyptian
Butterdon Linea	/ˈbʌtərdən/	Butterdon Hill, England
Cadmus Linea	/ˈkædməs/	Cadmus
Chthonius Linea	/ˈθoʊniəs/	Chthonius
Corick Linea		Corick, Northern Ireland
Drizzlecomb Linea		Drizzlecombe, England
Drumskinny Linea		Drumskinny, Northern Ireland
Echion Linea	/ɛˈkaɪɒn/	Echīon
Euphemus Linea	/juːˈfiːməs/	Euphemus
Glaukos Linea	/ˈɡlɔːkəs/	Glaucus
Harmonia Linea	/hɑːrˈmoʊniə/	Harmonia
Hyperenor Linea	/hɪpəˈriːnɔːr/	Hyperenor
Ino Linea	/ˈaɪnoʊ/	Ino
Katreus Linea	/ˈkeɪtriːəs/	Catreus
Kennet Linea	/ˈkɛnɪt/	West Kennet Long Barrow, England
Libya Linea	/ˈlɪbiə/	Libya
Mehen Linea		Mehen, Brittany
Merrivale Linea	/ˈmɛriveɪl/	Merrivale, Devon, England
Minos Linea	/ˈmaɪnɒs/	Minos
Onga Linea	/ˈɒŋɡə/	Onga (Phoenician Athena)
Pelagon Linea	/ˈpɛləɡɒn/	Pelagon
Pelorus Linea	/pɛˈlɔːrəs/	Pelorus
Phineus Linea	/ˈfɪniːəs/	Phineus
Phoenix Linea	/ˈfiːnɪks/	Phoenix, brother of Agenor
Rhadamanthys Linea	/rædəˈmænθəs/	Rhadamanthys
Sarpedon Linea	/sɑːrˈpiːdən/	Sarpedon, son of Europa
Sharpitor Linea		Sharpitor, England
Sparti Linea	/ˈspɑːrtaɪ/	Sparti
Staldon Linea	/ˈstɔːldən/	Stalldown Barrow (Staldon), England
Tectamus Linea	/ˈtɛktəməs/	Tectamus
Telephassa Linea	/tɛlɪˈfæsə/	Telephassa
Thasus Linea	/ˈθeɪsəs/	Thasus
Thynia Linea	/ˈθɪniə/	Thynia
Tormsdale Linea		Tormsdale, Scotland
Udaeus Linea	/juːˈdiːəs/	Udaeus
Yelland Linea	/ˈjɛlənd/	Yelland, England
