= Rhadamanthys Linea =

Linea terrain on Europa

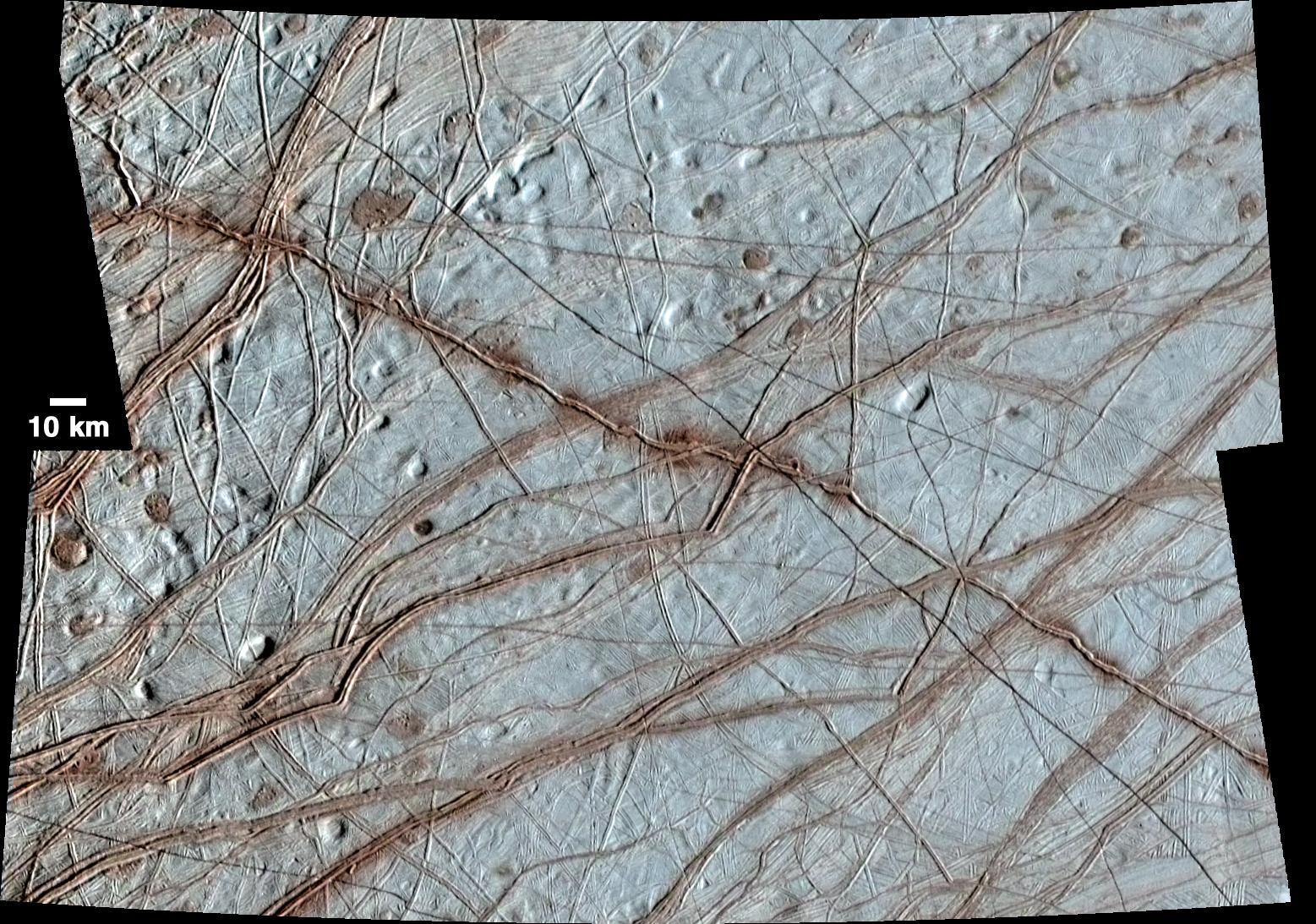
- An enhanced-color image of Rhadamanthys Linea, taken by the Galileo space probe on September 26 1998.
- Feature type: Linea
- Coordinates: 19.30°N 200.50°W
- Length: 1,747 km (1,086 mi)
- Eponym: Rhadamanthys

Rhadamanthys Linea is a linea structure on Jupiter's fourth largest moon Europa.

== Naming ==
Rhadamanthys Linea is named after an important figure in Greek mythology named Rhadamanthys (or Rhadamanthus), a demi-god and king of Crete who became one of the three judges of the souls of people after their death. Rhadamanthys was the son of Zeus (the Greek equivalent of the Roman god Jupiter) and the Phoenician princess Europa.

The International Astronomical Union (IAU), the organization responsible for formally naming astronomical bodies and their surface features, chose the name in accordance with the convention that states that surface features on Europa should be named after either places and figures associated with Celtic mythology, or relatives and descendants of princess Europa.

The name was approved by the IAU in 1985.

== Location ==
Rhadamanthys is located in the northern hemisphere of Europa, within a vast region called Falga Regio. It is surrounded by other lineae structures like Belus Linea, Phoenix Linea and Tectamus Linea. To its north are two other lineae, Minos Linea and Cadmus Linea.

To Rhadamanthys Linea's southwest is the extensive Dyfed Regio, while to its southeast lies the prominent crater Cilix.

Rhadamanthys Linea occupies the southern portion of the Rhadamanthys Linea quadrangle (or section) of Europa's surface. (designated Je4). This quadrangle is named after this geological feature.

== Geology ==
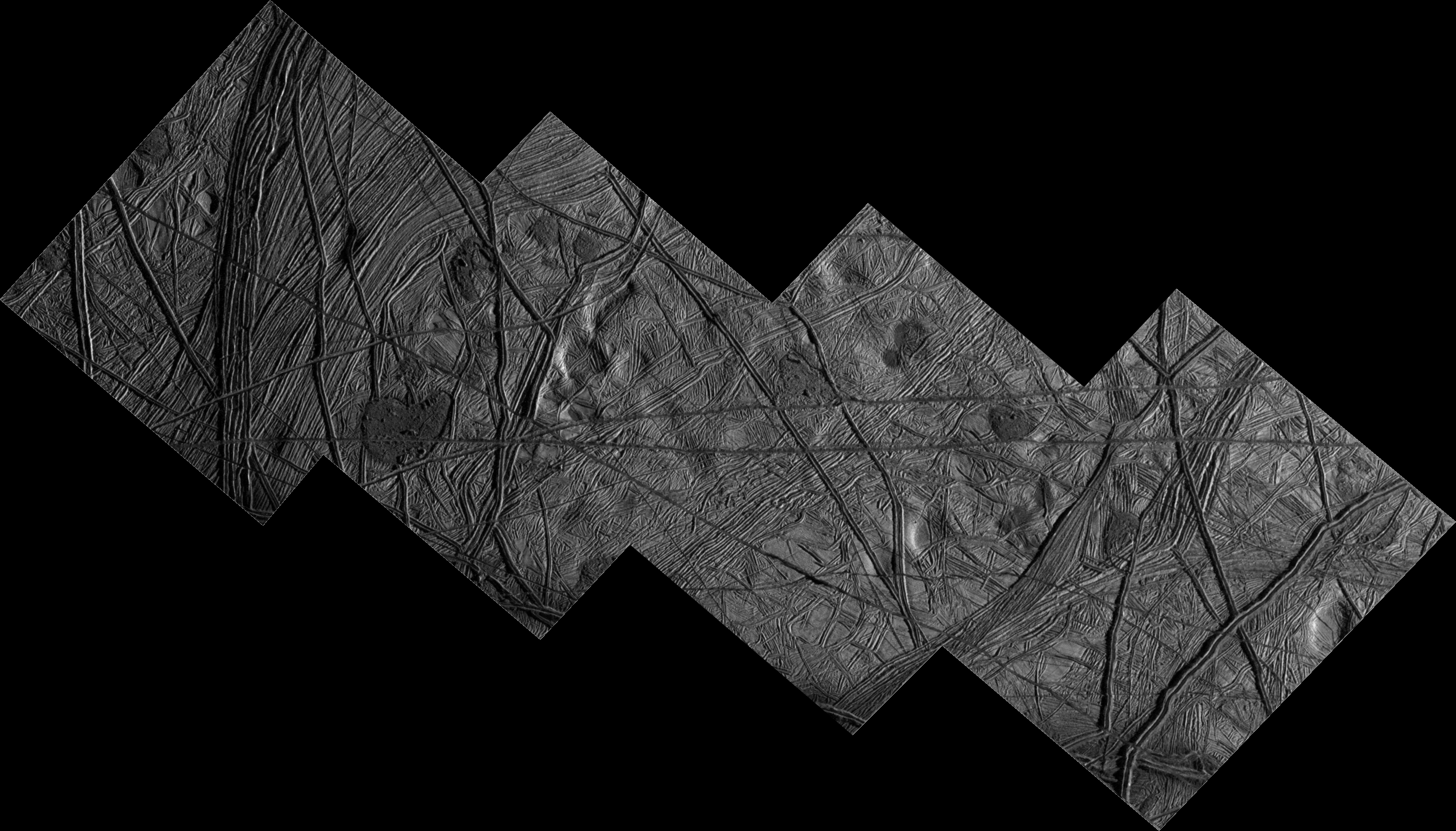
A high-resolution, mosaic of Rhadamanthys Linea, taken by Galileo in February 1999.

The surface of Europa is characterized by an extensive network of linear features, including cracks, ridges, and bands. Rhadamanthys Linea is one of the most notable examples of these linear features and is composed of crisscrossing cracks.

Rhadamanthys Linea is a major linear feature on Europa, extending for approximately 1,700 km (1,100 mi) across the moon's northern hemisphere, trending roughly to the west-northwest to east-southeast direction. Along its length are dozens of dark, elliptical patches superposed on the ridge, a spatial relationship that has been compared to scoria halos along terrestrial volcanic fissure systems. This association has led to the interpretation that Rhadamanthys Linea may record cryovolcanic activity rather than purely tectonic deformation.

The dark patches vary in size, with measured diameters ranging from 3 km (1.9 mi) to 30 km (19 mi) perpendicular to the linea, and a modal diameter of nearly 12 km (7.5 mi). Their morphology and distribution are consistent with emplacement by localized explosive venting along a linear fracture. Under this hypothesis, the deposits were produced by gas-rich cryomagmatic eruptions that ejected fine water-ice particles, possibly mixed with minor amounts of silicate material.

Although most ridges display a generally reddish hue in colorized images, Rhadamanthys Linea exhibits irregular, uneven patches of darker, redder material that are more pronounced in certain areas. Some researchers interpret these characteristics as evidence that Rhadamanthys is a recently, or possibly still, geologically active feature on Europa's surface.

The low-albedo deposits on either side of the ridges of Rhadamanthys Linea may consist of cryoclastic mantle material emplaced by plume activity.

== Tectonic Activity and Possible Subduction Zone ==
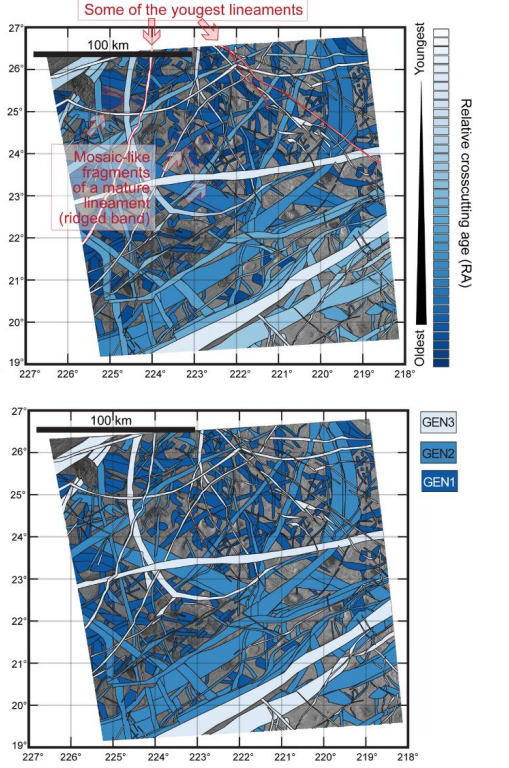
A topographic map of Rhadamanthys Linea, highlighting the relative ages of the linea's sections.

Rhadamanthys Linea forms one vertex of the so-called "Belus–Phoenix–Rhadamanthys Linea" (BPR) triangle, a region just north of Europa's equator characterized by a dense and complex network of lineaments. This region has been identified as a candidate area affected by subduction-like processes, making Rhadamanthys Linea an important reference feature in studies of Europan ice tectonics.

The area surrounding Rhadamanthys Linea lies within a zone previously interpreted as potentially influenced by low-relief subsumption, where portions of Europa's surface may have been removed or recycled into the subsurface. As part of the BPR triangle, Rhadamanthys Linea is embedded in a region that exhibits shortening, horizontal motion, and enhanced extensional deformation of the ice shell. These characteristics have been cited as consistent with deformation of ice plates associated with a “subducting” or subsuming crustal domain.

High-resolution Galileo imagery reveals that the Rhadamanthys Linea region is crosscut by more than 200 identified lineaments, including ridged bands, transitional ridged band–ridge features, troughs, ridges, cycloids, bands, and undifferentiated lineaments. Detailed mapping and crosscutting relationships indicate that these features formed during three distinct lineament-generation periods (designated as GEN1, GEN2, and GEN3).

The relative crosscutting ages of lineaments demonstrate that deformation near Rhadamanthys Linea was not continuous, but occurred in quasi-periodic episodes, likely linked to variations in tidal stress, orbital forcing, and nonsynchronous rotation of Europa's ice shell. These episodic stress regimes produced characteristic peaks and steps in the distribution of lineament ages.

The oldest generation of lineaments (GEN1) in the Rhadamanthys Linea region is dominated by ridged bands, suggesting the presence of a relatively stable, mature ice surface that allowed lineaments to evolve into morphologically complex forms. During the intermediate period (GEN2), the number of simpler features such as troughs and ridges increased, indicating a transitional tectonic regime. The youngest generation (GEN3) is dominated by troughs and ridges, reflecting a more juvenile surface state and increased extensional deformation.

This progression suggests a temporal change in the mechanical behavior of the ice shell, possibly linked to localized heating, thinning, or weakening of the lithosphere in the vicinity of Rhadamanthys Linea.

The formation and evolution of lineaments near Rhadamanthys Linea are interpreted as the result of multiple interacting processes. Periodic global stresses driven by tidal flexing, orbital eccentricity, obliquity variations, and nonsynchronous rotation likely controlled the timing of lineament formation. However, the observed decrease in the total number of lineaments through time implies the influence of additional, quasi-continuous processes that modified surface conditions.

Proposed contributors include subsurface thermal plumes, solid-state convection within the ice shell, and regional-scale tectonic shortening associated with subsumption-like activity. In particular, the Rhadamanthys Linea region may have experienced slab-pull–like forces analogous to terrestrial subduction, producing extension in the overlying ice and facilitating the formation of troughs, ridges, ridged bands, lenticulae, and microchaos.

Rhadamanthys Linea and its surrounding region provide key evidence that Europa's surface deformation is the result of both global tidal forcing and localized tectonic or thermal processes. The spatial association of Rhadamanthys Linea with a suspected subsumption zone suggests that it may play a role in surface renewal, downward transport of surface materials, and potential exchange between the ice shell and the subsurface ocean.

== Possible Explosive Cryovolcanism ==
Simple ballistic models of plume emplacement under Europa's low gravity and extremely tenuous atmosphere indicate that such deposits could be generated by eruptive plumes reaching heights of up to ~27 km (17 mi). This scenario requires eruption velocities of approximately 40 m (130 ft)–265 m (869 ft) per second. These estimates allow constraints to be placed on the volatile content and pressure conditions within the cryomagma source region. because liquid water is denser than ice and therefore negatively buoyant within an icy shell, ascent of cryomagma on Europa likely requires exsolution of dissolved volatile species—such as carbon dioxide, carbon monoxide, methane, or sulfur dioxide—during ascent through fractures in the ice shell. Gas exsolution near fracture tips may lead to rapid upward propagation of gas-filled cracks, entraining liquid water and producing explosive surface venting.

Eruptions at the surface may initially be gas-dominated, followed by the emission of water spray or foam, analogous in some respects to volcanic plumes observed on Io. Although the compositions of Ionian and Europan magmas differ substantially, plume behavior in low-pressure environments is expected to be broadly similar. Observations of Io indicate plume height-to-width ratios typically between 0.2 and 0.4, a range that may also apply to Europan cryovolcanic plumes if vent geometries and particle size distributions are comparable.

The dark coloration of the Rhadamanthys Linea deposits may result from minor entrainment of non-ice material, such as silicates, or from variations in ice grain size affecting surface photometric properties. While alternative explanations remain possible, the alignment, morphology, and scale of the dark patches along Rhadamanthys Linea support the interpretation that the feature represents one of the strongest candidates for explosive cryovolcanism on Europa.

If the larger dark patches observed on Europa's surface (for example, so-called “freckles”) are produced by explosive cryovolcanic activity, then substantially higher concentrations of gas are required. This implies that explosive venting on Europa is unlikely to involve the ascent and fragmentation of homogeneous water–bubble mixtures, a process more typical of basaltic lava fountains on Earth. Instead, some mechanism for gas segregation is likely necessary to trigger explosive eruptions of cryomagmatic material. These considerations support the eruption model proposed by Crawford and Stevenson, in which explosive venting results from the propagation of dikes containing large proportions of gas that have separated from the cryomagma.

== Exploration ==
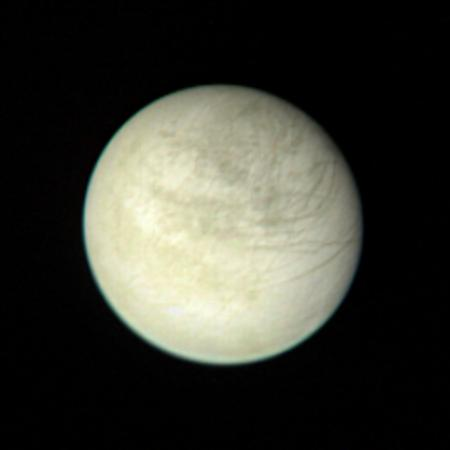
An image of Europa showing Rhadamanthys Linea, taken by Voyager 1 in March 1979 during its approach towards Jupiter.

Voyager 1 and Voyager 2 both explored Europa during their respective flybys of the Jovian system in March 1979 and July 1979. However, Voyager 1 was 2,870,000 km (1,780,000 mi) away from Europa when it viewed Rhadamanthys Linea, which produced only low resolution images, while Voyager 2 imaged the moon's leading hemisphere, which does not include Rhadamanthys Linea.

Galileo was the first spacecraft to obtain high-resolution images of Rhadamanthys Linea during its mission in orbit around Jupiter between December 1995 and September 2003. A close flyby of Europa in September 1998 yielded the highest-resolution images of the feature available to date. However, a minor pointing error in pointing the spacecraft's camera resulted in the images being slightly off target, causing much of the linea to be missed.

=== Future Missions ===
As of 2026, two space probes are en route to Europa. The first is NASA's Europa Clipper mission, scheduled to arrive at Jupiter in April 2030. The spacecraft will orbit Jupiter in a pattern that allows at least 49 flybys of Europa, approaching as close as 25 km (16 mi) to the moon's surface. Equipped with an ice-penetrating radar capable of probing Europa's ice shell, Europa Clipper will be able to investigate what lies beneath the cracks and faults of Rhadamanthys Linea.

The second probe is the European Space Agency's Jupiter Icy Moons Explorer (Juice), which will arrive at Jupiter in July 2031. Juice will fly by Europa only twice, as its primary focus will be on Ganymede and Callisto, but it will complement the data collected by Europa Clipper.

== See also ==
- List of geological features on Europa
- List of quadrangles on Europa
