= Tara Regio =

Region on Europa

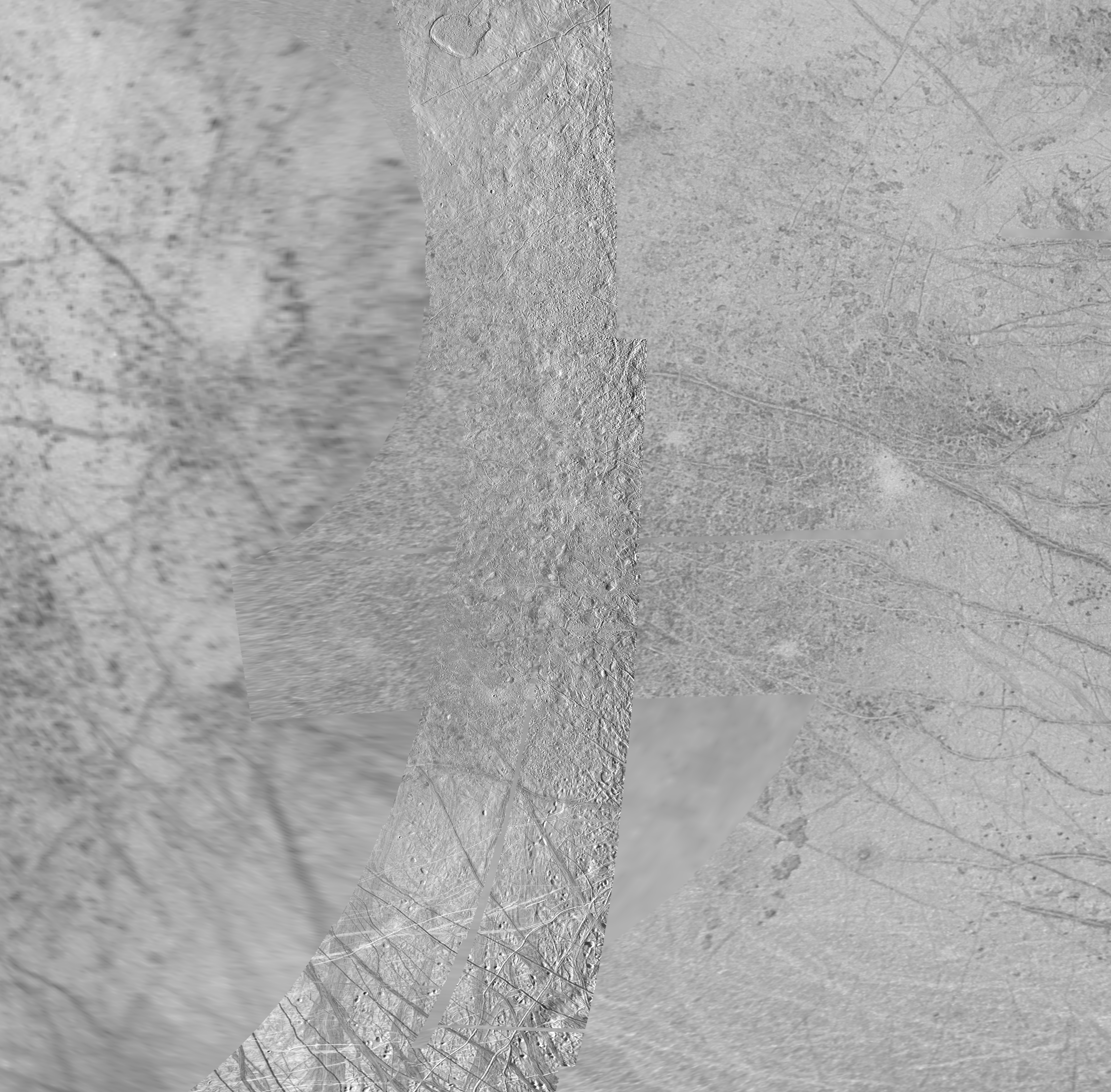
- Mosaic map of Tara Regio, in Mercator projection. The mitten-shaped feature at the top of the image is Murias Chaos.
- Feature type: Regio
- Coordinates: 10°S 75°W
- Diameter: 1,780 kilometres (1,110 mi) (irregularly shaped)
- Eponym: Tara Hill, Ireland

Tara Regio is an extensive, slightly darkened, and chaotic surface feature on Europa, the fourth largest moon of Jupiter. It is an irregular feature dominated by jumbled, disrupted and chaotic terrain. The chemicals present on Tara Regio make it an important area on Europa in the search for extraterrestrial life-related chemistry.

== Naming ==
Tara Regio is named after the Hill of Tara in Ireland, the location of burial mounds and standing stones associated with Irish legends and mythology. The site was later used for inaugurations of the High Kings of Ireland.

The International Astronomical Union (IAU) requires that surface features on Europa are named after deities, figures and places associated with either Celtic mythology or the Phoenician princess Europa. Irish mythology is historically considered as a part of the broader Celtic mythology. The name for Tara Regio was approved by the IAU in May 2007.

== Location ==
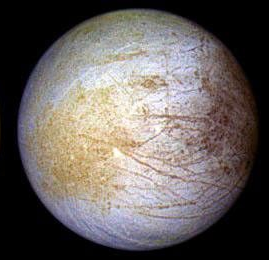
Tara Regio is the yellow region on the left side of this enhanced color image of Europa. The yellow coloration seems to be from sodium chloride arising from Europa's subsurface ocean.

Tara Regio is an extensive feature dominating about a sixth of Europa's Jupiter-facing side. It straddles the moon’s equator, although most of its surface area is located in the southern hemisphere.

To the northeast of Tara Regio is the prominent terrain called Murias Chaos (affectionately called "The Mitten" due to its shape) and the crater Brigid.

To the east lies Euphemus Linea and another darker region called Annwn Regio, and to the south east are Butterdon Linea and Camulus crater.

Because of its huge surface area and its position, Tara Regio is located within four quadrangles of Europa: the Euphemus Linea (designated Je6), Brigid (designated Je7), Butterdon Linea (designated Je11) and Taliesin (designated Je12) quadrangles.

Tara Regio is mostly situated in the hemisphere of Europa that permanently faces Jupiter. As Europa rotates synchronously while it orbits its parent planet, an observer standing on Tara Regio would always see Jupiter in the sky in the same place at all times. Jupiter will only start sinking below the horizon when the observer travels to the westernmost ends of the regio. (Note: For moons in synchronous rotation, such as Europa, 0° longitude corresponds to the part of the surface that always faces Jupiter. Regions between 90° W, 0° and 270° W longitude perpetually face the moon's parent planet.)

== Chemistry ==
Tara Regio became an area of interest on Europa because sodium chloride (better known as table salt) and carbon dioxide were discovered to be present on its surface. A study in 2019 that reviewed the images and spectrograph of Tara Regio taken by the Galileo space probe in June 1997 revealed that the yellowish materials on the regio are actually table salt, suggesting that the salty subsurface ocean of Europa may chemically resemble Earth's oceans more than previously thought.

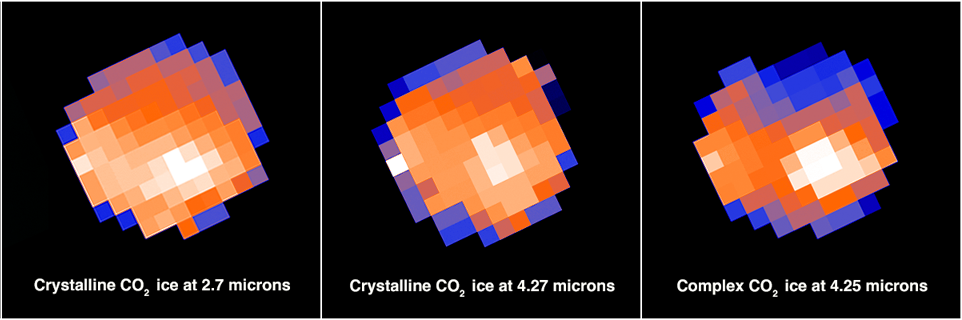
A series of images of Europa in different wavelengths by the James Webb Space Telescope. The different wavelengths show the presence of different forms of carbon dioxide on Europa.

Additionally, near-infrared and multiple-wavelength images taken by the James Webb Space Telescope in September 2023 revealed that sources of different forms of carbon necessary for life — particularly high concentrations of carbon dioxide — appear to be abundant on Tara Regio. The analysis suggests that this carbon most likely formed within the subsurface ocean, rather than being brought in by meteorites or other external sources. In addition, its deposition appears to have occurred relatively recently in geological terms. These findings carry significant implications for the potential habitability of Europa’s ocean.

== Exploration ==
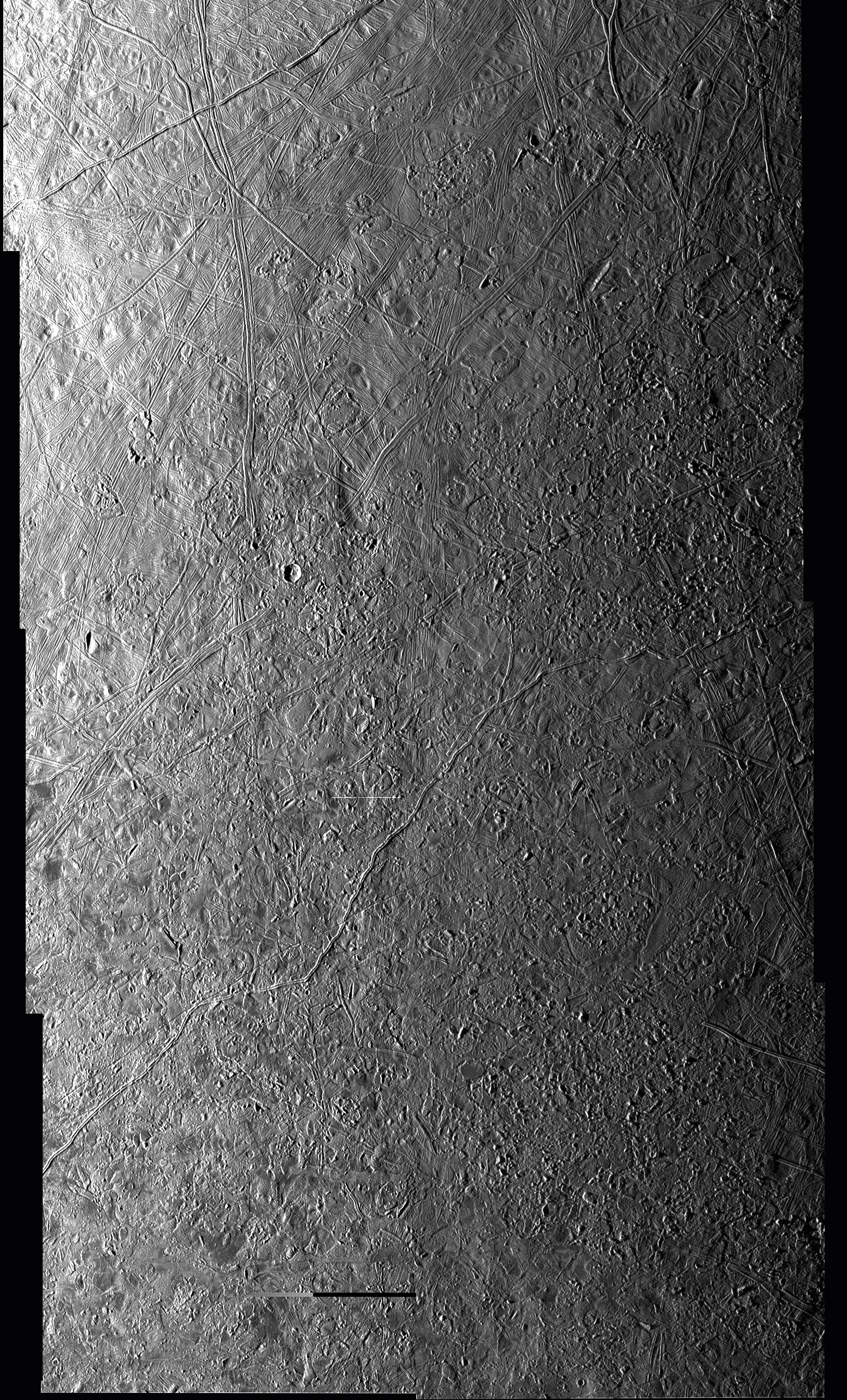
A high resolution image of the northwestern part of Tara Regio, taken by Galileo in May 1998.

Tara Regio is a highly chaotic region composed of severely disrupted terrain. It was first properly imaged by Galileo when it flew by Europa several times as it orbited Jupiter from December 1995 to September 2003.

Galileo imaged Tara Regio multiple times, capturing its highest-resolution images during the E15 and E17 flybys of Europa in May 1998 and September 1998, respectively. These images resolved details as small as 220 m (720 ft) to 230 m (750 ft) per pixel. The high-resolution data revealed the true rugged and chaotic nature of Tara Regio. However, only four images of Tara Regio were ultimately returned by Galileo due to technical issues that arose within the probe’s imaging system.

=== Future Missions ===
Two space probes are currently on their way to Europa. The first is NASA’s Europa Clipper, which was launched in October 2024 and is scheduled to arrive at Jupiter in April 2030. It will orbit Jupiter on a path designed to conduct at least 49 flybys of Europa, with its closest approaches coming within 25 km (16 mi) of the moon’s surface. The spacecraft is equipped with highly sophisticated chemical analyzers, which will allow it to precisely determine whether the elements necessary for life to arise are truly present in sufficient amounts on Tara Regio.

The second probe is the Jupiter Icy Moons Explorer (Juice), which was launched by the European Space Agency’s (ESA) in April 2023. The probe is expected to arrive at Jupiter in July 2031. Juice will fly by Europa only twice, as its primary focus will be on the other icy Galilean moons Ganymede and Callisto. The data collected by Juice are expected to complement the observations made by Europa Clipper.

== See also ==
- List of geological features on Europa
