= Murias Chaos =

Chaos terrain on Europa

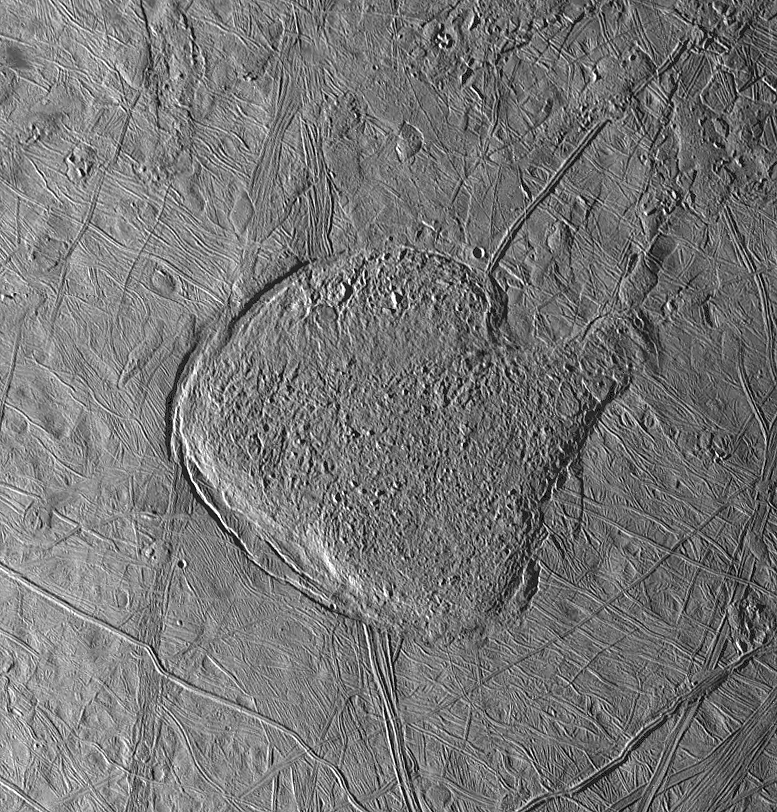
- An image of Murias Chaos, taken by the Galileo space probe on May 31 1998.
- Feature type: Chaos terrain
- Coordinates: 22.40°N 83.80°W
- Diameter: 116 km (72 mi)
- Eponym: Murias

Murias Chaos (affectionately called "the Mitten" due to its shape), is a large, 116 km (72 mi) by 77 km (48 mi) elevated chaos terrain on the leading hemisphere of Jupiter's fourth largest moon Europa. Although it superficially resembles typical Europan chaos terrain, data show that it is fundamentally different in structure, evolution, and origin.

It is usually interpreted as the surface expression of a rare, large thermal diapir that ascended through Europa's icy shell, breached the surface, and extruded material outward, followed by partial downward deformation and down-warping.

== Naming ==
Murias Chaos is named after a fantastical island city from Irish Celtic mythology. Murias is one of the Four Great Cities of the Tuatha Dé Danann, the supernatural people who precede the Milesians in medieval Irish tradition. Murias is primarily known as the source of the Cauldron of the Dagda, one of the Four Treasures brought to Ireland by the Tuatha Dé Danann. Murias is commonly associated with the west, a direction frequently linked with the Otherworld in Celtic cosmology and the ocean, as well as wisdom, magic, and nourishment embodied in the Dagda's cauldron.

The International Astronomical Union (IAU), the organization responsible for formally naming surface features on astronomical bodies, chose the name in accordance with the convention that stipulates that chaos terrains on Europa should be named after places associated with Celtic myths. Irish mythology is one of the branches of the broader Celtic mythology.

The name was approved by the IAU in 2003.

== Location ==
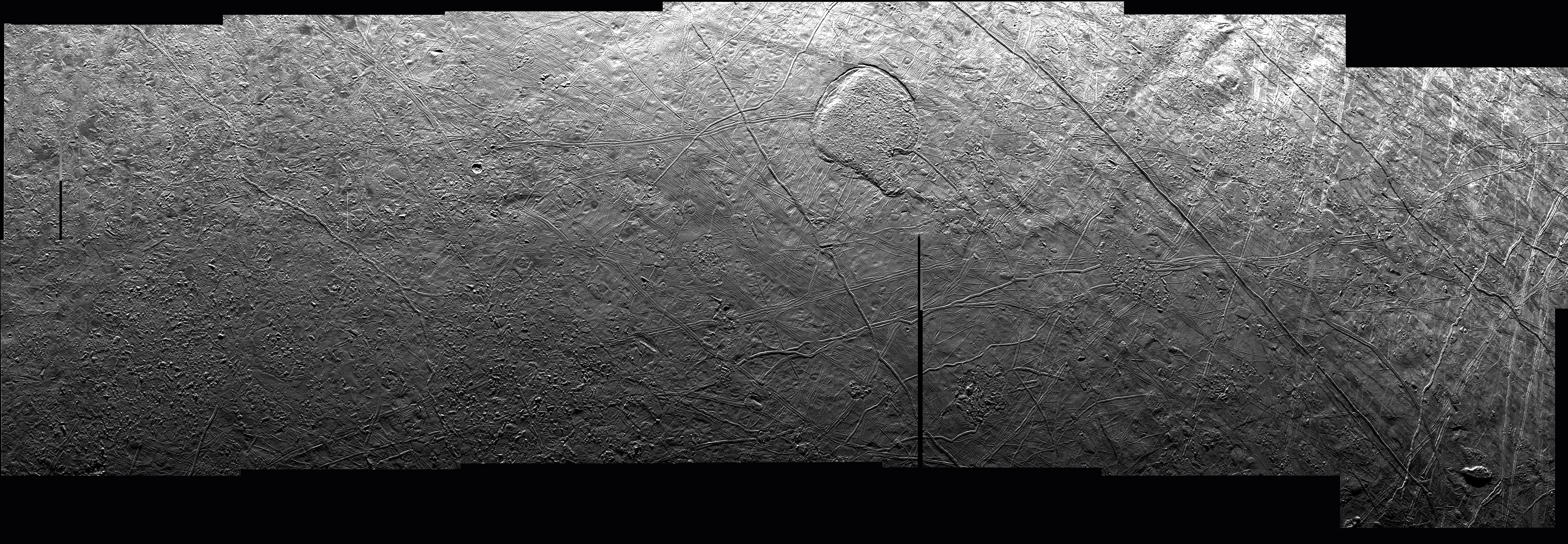
A mosaic image of the regions to the north (left) and south (right) of Murias Chaos, taken by Galileo in May 1998.

Murias Chaos is located in the northern hemisphere of Europa, on the moon's leading hemisphere. It is surrounded by two other chaos terrains: Rathmore Chaos to the east and Arran Chaos to the south. The extensive Tara Regio dominates the areas southeast of Murias Chaos, while the crater Bress lies to the northeast. To the east is Lug, which is probably a dark rim crater.

Murias Chaos is located in the southwestern corner of the Murias Chaos quadrangle quadrangle (or section) of Europa's surface. (designated Je2).

This quadrangle is named after this geological feature.

== Formation and Origin ==
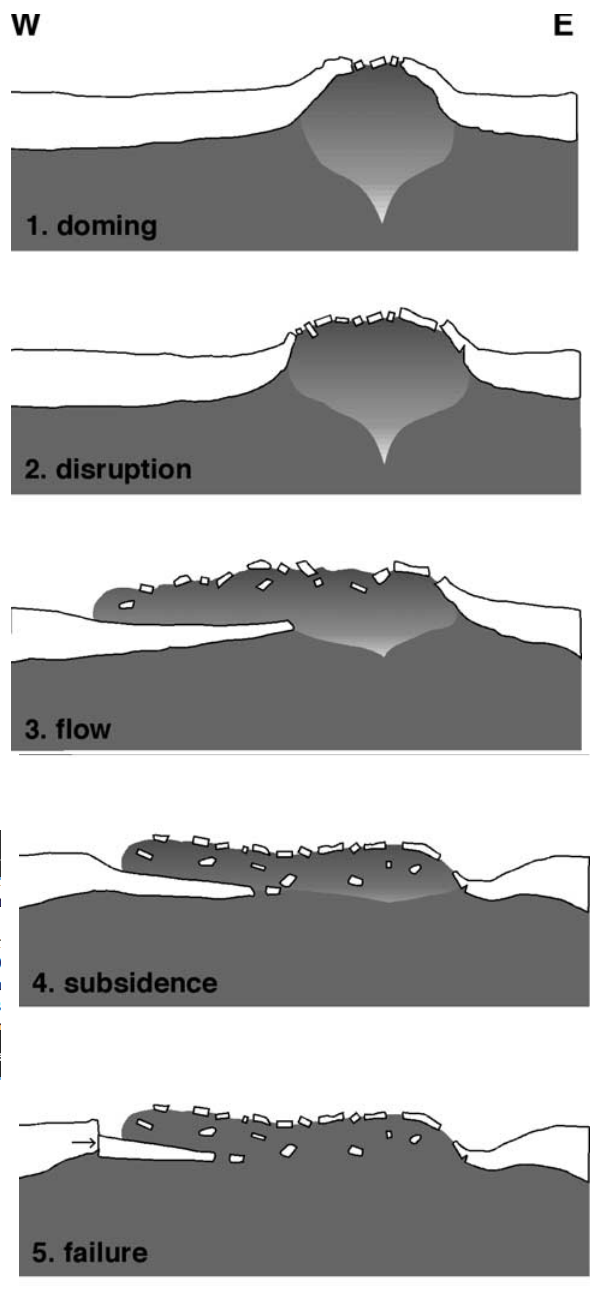
A diagram showing how Murias Chaos probably formed.

Murias Chaos is interpreted as the surface expression of an unusual endogenic process distinct from those that form most Europan chaos terrains. While it was initially classified as an elevated chaos region, multiple lines of geological and topographic evidence indicate that it did not form solely through shallow melting or the disruption of preexisting crust by small diapirs. Instead, Murias Chaos is best explained by the ascent and extrusion of a large thermal diapir within Europa's icy shell.

Thermal–mechanical modeling suggests that a diapir with an initial radius of approximately 5 km (3.1 mi)–8 km (5.0 mi), originating at depths of 20 km (12 mi)–40 km (25 mi), would remain sufficiently warm and buoyant to rise through a several-kilometer-thick elastic lithosphere. Upon reaching the surface, this diapir would have updomed and fractured the overlying plains before extruding warm, mobile ice onto the surrounding terrain. The observed flow-like deposits extending tens of kilometers from the Murias Chaos margins are consistent with such cryovolcanic extrusion.

Following its emplacement, Murias Chaos likely underwent partial subsidence due to a combination of isostatic adjustment, viscous relaxation of warm ice, and loading of the surrounding plains. This post-emplacement modification may explain why the present-day relief of Murias Chaos is modest compared with the degree of uplift inferred from structural and geomorphic indicators.

=== Geological Context and Evolution ===
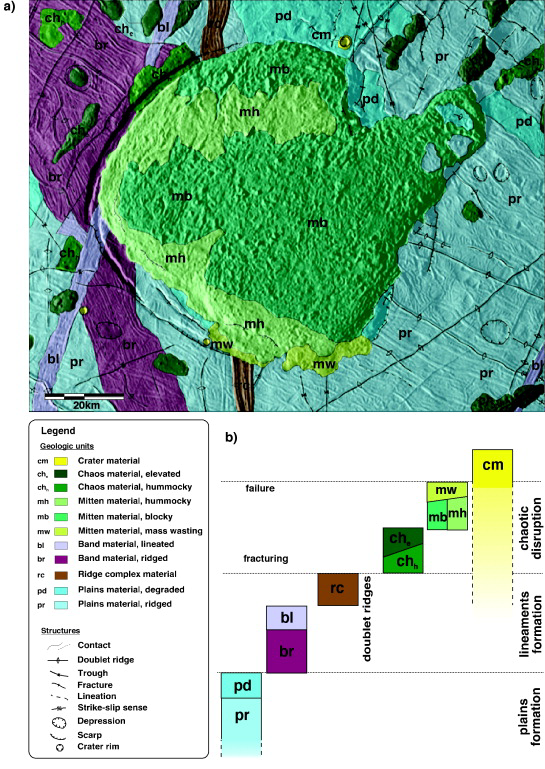
A geologic map of Murias Chaos.

Geologic mapping indicates that Murias Chaos formed after the development of the surrounding ridged plains, bands, and ridge complexes, placing it relatively late in the resurfacing history of Europa's leading hemisphere. Murias Chaos material overlies and locally deforms these older units, demonstrating that it represents a distinct phase of endogenic activity rather than a modification of existing chaos terrain.

Comparisons with smaller domed features observed elsewhere on Europa, particularly in the E17 region, suggest that Murias Chaos may represent an advanced or enlarged example of a broader class of diapir-related structures. In this interpretation, smaller domes record early stages of diapiric ascent and surface uplift, whereas Murias Chaos represents a rare case in which a large diapir breached the surface and produced extensive extrusion.

== Implications for Europa's Ice Shell ==
Murias Chaos provides important constraints on the thickness and thermal state of Europa's lithosphere. Plate flexure modeling indicates an elastic lithosphere several kilometers thick in Murias Chaos region, supporting models in which Europa's ice shell is relatively thick and capable of solid-state convection. In this framework, most chaos terrain may form from clusters of small diapirs, whereas Murias Chaos records the uncommon ascent of a large diapir capable of producing cryovolcanic resurfacing.

As such, Murias Chaos is considered a rare and significant feature on Europa, offering insight into the mechanisms of internal heat transport, cryovolcanism, and the evolution of the moon's icy shell.

== Exploration ==
Voyager 1 and Voyager 2 both explored Europa in March 1979 and July 1979 respectively during their flyby of the Jovian system. However, only Voyager 2 imaged a small portion of Europa's leading hemisphere where Murias Chaos is located. Voyager 2's closest approach to Europa was 200,000 km (120,000 mi), allowing it to obtain detailed views of the moon. However, Murias Chaos was on the night side of Europa during Voyager 2's closest approach.

Galileo was the first probe to capture high-resolution images of Murias Chaos during its orbit around Jupiter between December 1995 and September 2003. Its close flyby of Europa in May 1998 provided the highest-resolution images of Murias Chaos available to date.

=== Future Missions ===
Two space probes are currently on their way to Europa. The first is NASA's Europa Clipper mission, which will arrive at Jupiter in April 2030. The probe will orbit Jupiter in such a way that it will fly by Europa at least 49 times, coming as close as 25 km (16 mi) to the surface. Europa Clipper carries an ice-penetrating radar designed to see through Europa's ice shell, allowing it to investigate what lies beneath Murias Chaos. This will help planetary scientists understand how the chaos terrain evolved and what currently lies beneath it.

The second probe is the European Space Agency's (ESA) Jupiter Icy Moons Explorer (Juice), which will arrive at Jupiter in July 2031. Juice will fly by Europa only twice, but it will help supplement the data collected by Europa Clipper.

== See also ==
- List of geological features on Europa
- List of quadrangles on Europa
