= Moyle Cavus =

Depression on Europa, Jupiter

- Feature type: Cavus
- Location: Europa, Jupiter
- Coordinates: 25.00°S 168.00°W
- Diameter: 145 km (90 mi)
- Naming: 28 May 2019
- Eponym: Moyle, in Celtic mythology

Moyle Cavus is a cavus on Europa, a moon of Jupiter. The cavus was named after Moyle, a cold sea where, according to Celtic mythology, the children of Lir (Llyr) spent three hundred years as swans. The name "Moyle Cavus" was officially approved by the International Astronomical Union (IAU) on 28 May 2019.

== Geology and characteristics ==
Its coordinates are 25.00°S 168.00°W, and it has diameter of 145 kilometres (90 mi).
