= Argadnel =

Argadnel (Celtic: Maig Arggatnéul, lit. 'plain of a silver cloud') is one of the islands of the Earthly Paradise that were, according to Celtic mythology, visited by Bran the Blessed.

In 2003, the International Astronomical Union adopted the name for a regio of Europa.
