= Castalia Macula =

Very dark region on Europa

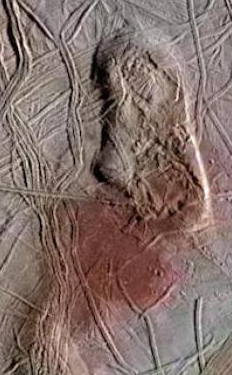
- An image of Castalia Macula, taken by the Galileo space probe on 29 March 1998.
- Feature type: Macula
- Coordinates: 1.60°S 225.70°W
- Length: 35 kilometres (22 mi) (irregularly shaped)
- Eponym: Castalian Spring

Castalia Macula is a very dark spot on the surface of Jupiter's fourth largest moon Europa. It is considered as one of the darkest and reddest surface features on the moon.

== Naming ==
Castalia Macula is named after a legendary spring at Delphi in Greek mythology. According to the book The Greek Myths by Rovert Graves, the spring was once guarded by a dragon. When Cadmus, the brother of the Phoenician princess Europa, attempted to draw water from the spring to purify the cow he was about to sacrifice to the gods, the dragon attacked Cadmus and his companions. Cadmus ultimately defeated and slew the guardian dragon.

The International Astronomical Union (IAU) chose the name Castalia in accordance with the rule that surface features on Europa should be named after figures and places associated with either Celtic mythology or the princess Europa. The Castalian Spring was visited by Cadmus during his search for his abducted sister Europa, placing Castalia Macula within the latter naming category. The word macula means “stain” in Latin, reflecting the crater's appearance as a dark stain on Europa's bright icy surface.

The name Castalia Macula was approved by the IAU in 2003.

== Location ==
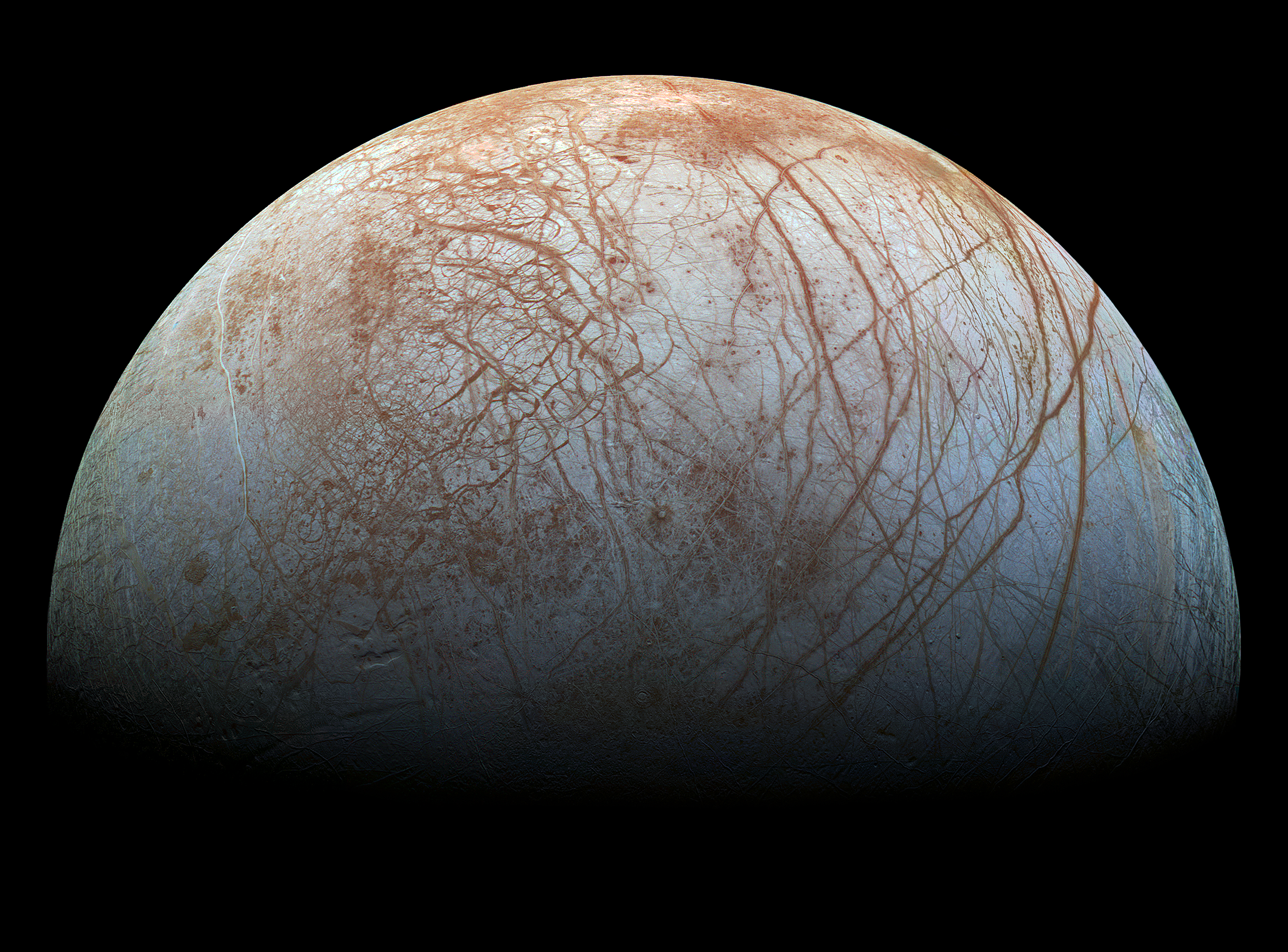
An enhanced image of Europa, showing Castalian Macula (the very dark and red splotch near the top of the image). This image was taken by the Galileo space probe.

Castalia Macula is located just a few kilometers south of Europa's equator, and on the eastern edge of a dark region on Europa known as Dyfed Regio.

To the north of Castalia Macula is a linea feature known as Belus Linea, while to the northwest is the major crater Manannán. To the southwest is Argadnel Regio which is populated by several lineae features.

Castalia Macula is located near the eastern end of the Castalia Macula quadrangle (designated Je9) of Europa. The quadrangle is named after the macula.

Like all major moons in the Solar System, Europa orbits Jupiter in synchronous rotation, meaning that one hemisphere of Europa always faces Jupiter while the opposite hemisphere never does. Castalia Macula is located on Europa's anti-Jovian hemisphere—the side that permanently faces away from Jupiter—and, as a result, an observer standing on Castalia Macula would never see Jupiter in the sky. (Note: For moons in synchronous rotation, such as Europa, 0° longitude corresponds to the part of the surface that always faces Jupiter. Regions between 90° W to 180° W to 270° W longitude never face the moon's parent planet.)

== Color ==
Castalia Macula is a young, geologically active site where dark, reddish material from Europa's subsurface erupted out in a fluid state, pooled in a shallow depression, and then mostly drained back down underground through fractures on the icy surface, leaving behind a residual dark “stain” behind, with small areas of locally ponded material remaining in low areas.

High-resolution imaging and stereo-derived topography from the Galileo spacecraft show that Castalia Macula is centered within a broad, gently sloping surface depression approximately 350 metres (1,150 ft) deep, flanked by a large, peanut-shaped dome rising about 900 metres (3,000 ft) to the north, and another dome at least 750 metres (2,460 ft) to the south. Together, these features produce one of the largest known local topographic reliefs on Europa.

The margins of the deposit generally follow contours of constant elevation, supporting an origin involving flow and ponding rather than simple surface coating. Although the dark material floods around ridges and fills troughs, much of the underlying topography is preserved, implying that the deposit was relatively thin.

Color and albedo data show that Castalia Macula is among the darkest and reddest features observed on Europa, consistent with minimal surface alteration and a young surface age. The dark material is interpreted to contain a significant non-ice component, potentially including hydrated salt or other materials derived from below the surface.

The nearby elevated area called Castalia Mons has a color and albedo similar to the Castalia Macula. Whether flows from the plateau were a source for the dark material that covers Castalia Macula is not known.

Because this material likely came from below the ice shell and was emplaced recently, Castalia Macula is considered one of the best candidate sites to sample subsurface (possibly ocean-linked) material on Europa.

== Potential Future Landing Site ==
Castalia Macula was recommended as a potential landing site for a Europa lander mission for several reasons. The Macula is relatively smooth and flat, which reduces landing risks and its area of ~600 m^{2} (6,500 sq ft) is large enough to accommodate the lander's landing ellipse.

The macula may contain recently erupted material from the subsurface. Potentially, the erupted materials could have been in contact with Europa's subsurface ocean, making it a good site for astrobiological studies.

The site exhibits relative youth, as suggested by the lack of cross-cutting features, even though the depression is believed to be older than nearby domes. Being a depression surrounded by high domes (the north dome is 900 metres (3,000 ft) high while the south dome is 750 metres (2,460 ft)), the site provides a large topographic range for cameras to study the landscape. Its smooth surface can also allow the safe deployment of seismometers and communication facilities with orbiters, supporting geophysics objectives.

== Exploration ==
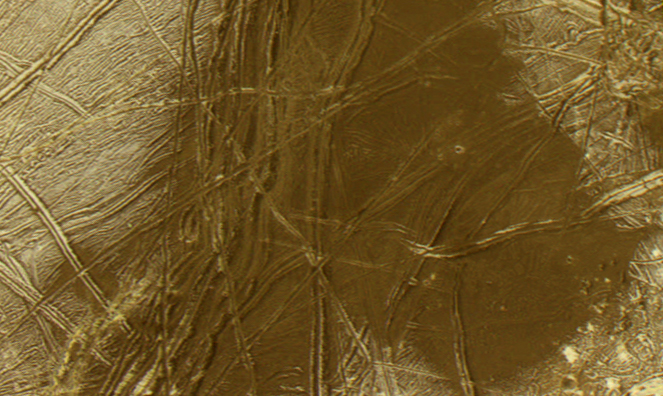
A close-up image of Castalia Macula, taken by Galileo

As of 2026, only one spacecraft was able to image Castalia Macula. Galileo was the first and only spacecraft to obtain high-resolution images of the feature while orbiting Jupiter from December 1995 to September 2003, providing the most detailed images available to date. During Galileo's E14 flyby of Europa in March 1998, the probe achieved resolutions as fine as 20 metres (66 ft) per pixel, clearly revealing details of the surface.

=== En Route Missions ===
As of 2026, two space probes are currently en route to Europa. The first, NASA's Europa Clipper mission, launched in October 2024, is expected to reach Jupiter in April 2030. It will orbit Jupiter along a trajectory that allows for at least 49 flybys of Europa, with the closest approaches coming within 25 km (16 mi) of the moon's surface. Equipped with an ice-penetrating radar, Europa Clipper will study both the surface composition of the macula and the subsurface structure of Europa's ice shell beneath the fractures of Castalia.

The second probe is the European Space Agency's Jupiter Icy Moons Explorer (Juice), launched in April 2023 and expected to reach Jupiter in July 2031. Juice will fly by Europa only twice, as its primary focus is on Ganymede and Callisto. Nevertheless, the data collected by Juice will complement the observations made by Europa Clipper.

== See also ==
- List of geological features on Europa
