= Fir Fálgae =

Fir Fálgae is an Irish term of varying definition, but generally referring to the people of the Isle of Man. It may have originated in the 10th century, and normally designated 'men of [the Isle of] Man'. However, British Library iii 755.22494 glosses it i. Inse Gall indiu ("nowadays the Hebrides"). This seems to denote changes in ethnic designation of the Norse-Irish or the Gall Gaidel, perhaps in connection with the territorial changes of the Kingdom of Mann and the Isles.

A number of Ulster Cycle texts mention a raid on the Fir Fálgae involving the warriors Cú Roí and Cú Chulainn. Works such as Aided Con Roí, Forfess Fer Fálgae, and Síaburcharpat Con Culainn allude to a lost story in which the Ulstermen raid the Fir Fálgae and abduct their king's daughter Bláthnat. Evidently, Cú Roí carries the girl off and humiliates Cú Chulainn in battle when he tries to stop him, causing enmity between the two heroes.
