= Lineae =

Long markings on a planet or moon

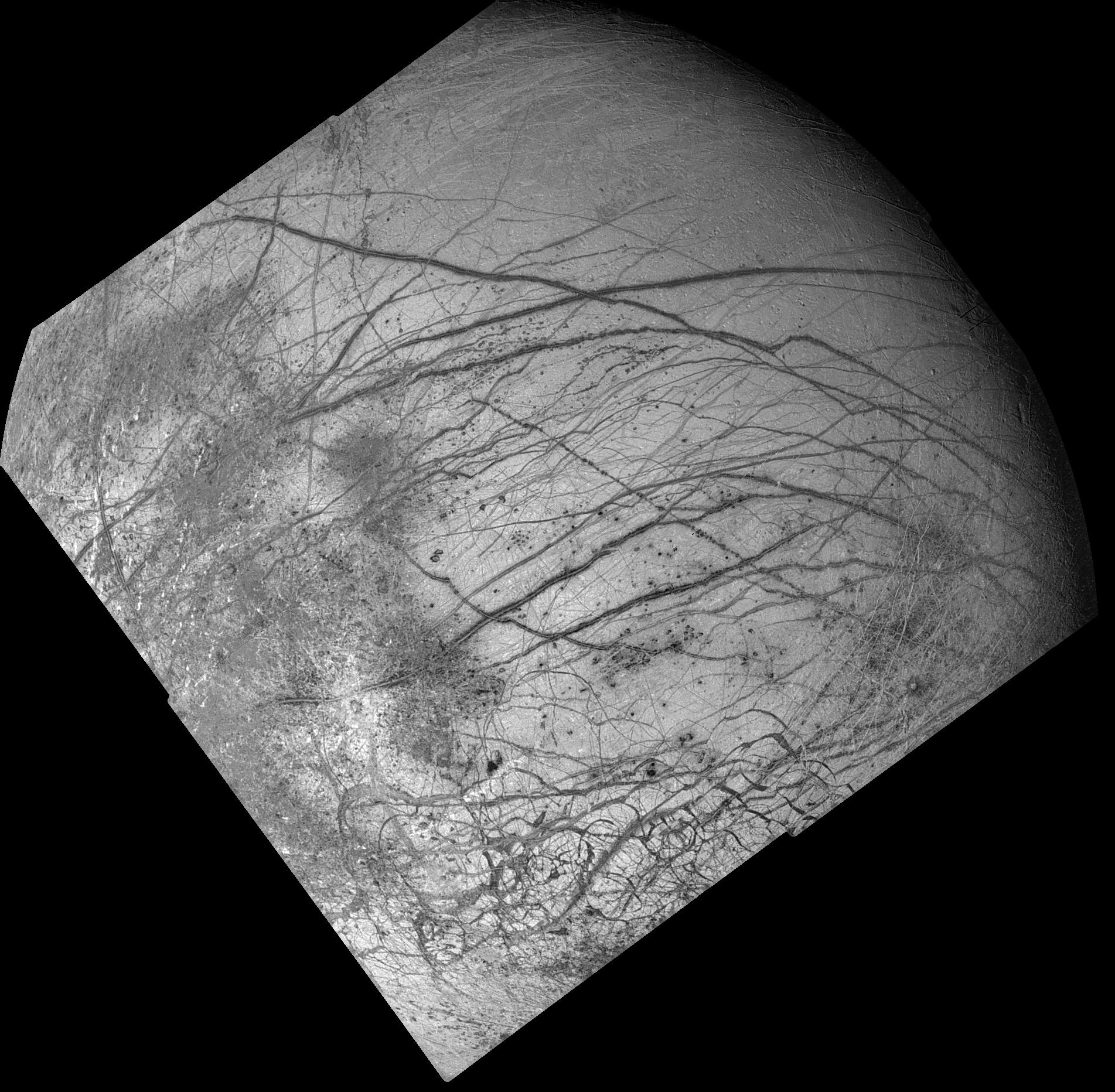
Black & white view of lineae on Europa taken by NASAs Galileo spacecraft.

Linea /ˈlɪniːə/ (plural: lineae /ˈlɪnɪiː/) is Latin for 'line'. In planetary geology it is used to refer to any long markings, dark or bright, on a planet or moon's surface. The planet Venus and Jupiter's moon Europa have numerous lineae; Saturn's moon Rhea and the dwarf planet Pluto have several.

On Mars, recurring slope lineae form seasonally on warm Martian slopes as dark downhill streaks, growing during warm seasons and fading in cold seasons. They are thought to be either caused by salty liquid water flows during warm months, or dry grains flowing down in a kind of landslide.

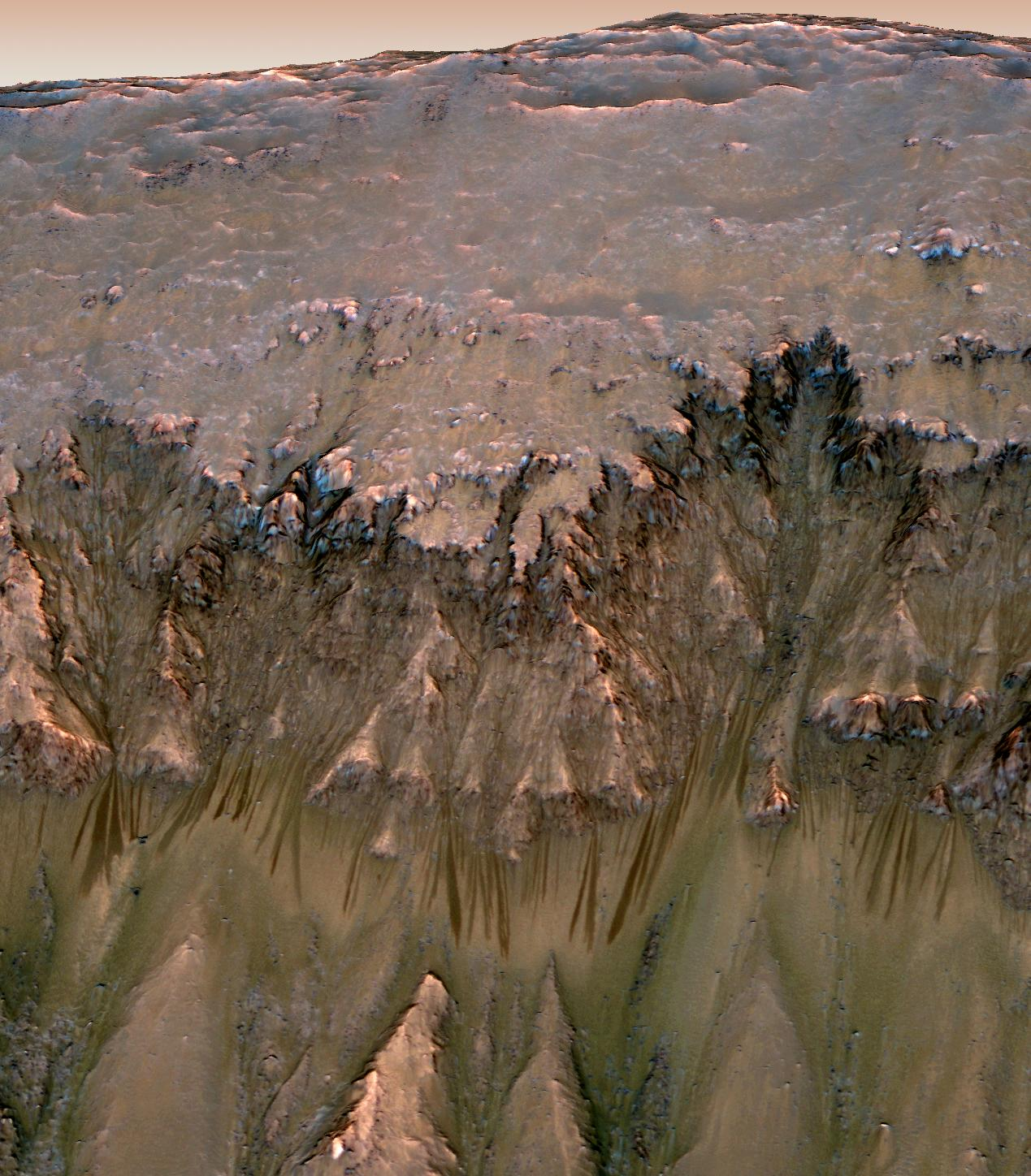
Recurring slope lineae as seen on Newton crater of Mars.

== See also ==
- List of lineae on Europa
- List of lineae on Venus
- List of lineae on Rhea
- List of lineae on Pluto
