= Cilix (crater) =

Crater on Europa

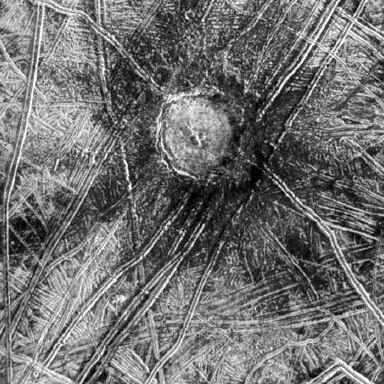
Cilix as photographed by Galileo on 31 May 1998.

Cilix /ˈsaɪlɪks/ is a small crater on Europa that serves as the reference point for the moon's system of longitude. The longitude of Cilix's center is defined as being 182° W, thus establishing the moon's prime meridian. It is named after Cilix, the brother of Europa.

Cilix is about 15 km in diameter.
