= Rowland (given name) =

Rowland is an English male given name. It is a medieval variation of Roland.

== Notable people with the given name "Rowland" include ==
=== A ===
- Rowland Abiodun (born 1941), Nigerian-Canadian historian
- Rowland K. Adams (1889–1944), American judge
- Rowland Allanson-Winn (1855–1935), Irish politician
- Rowland Alston (disambiguation), multiple people
- Rowland Anderson (1872–1959), Australian politician
- Rowland Atkinson, British academic

=== B ===
- Rowland Bailey (1876–1950), Australian cricketer
- Rowland Baring (disambiguation), multiple people
- Rowland Barnes (1940–2005), American judge
- Rowland Barran (1858–1949), English politician
- Rowland Bateman (1737–1803), Irish politician
- Rowland Beckett, Australian rugby league footballer
- Rowland Berkeley (disambiguation), multiple people
- Rowland Berthoff (1921–2001), American historian
- Rowland Biffen (1874–1949), British botanist
- Rowland Blades (1868–1953), English politician
- Rowland Blennerhassett (disambiguation), multiple people
- Rowland Bourke (1885–1958), Canadian soldier
- Rowland Bowen (1916–1978), English cricket researcher
- Rowland Griffiths Bowen (1879–1965), Australian naval officer
- Rowland Brotherhood (1812–1883), British engineer
- Rowland Brotherhood (cricketer) (1841–1938), English cricketer
- Rowland Brown (1900–1963), American screenwriter
- Rowland Burdon (disambiguation), multiple people

=== C ===
- Rowland Carter (1875–1916), English architect
- Rowland Codling (1880–1954), English footballer
- Rowland L. Collins (1935–1985), English professor
- Rowland Cotton (1581–1634), English politician
- Rowland Croucher (born 1937), Australian pastor

=== D ===
- Rowland Dawkins (??–1691), Welsh politician
- Rowland Davies (disambiguation), multiple people
- Rowland L. Davis (1871–1954), American judge
- Rowland Robert Teape Davis (1807–1879), New Zealand activist
- Rowland Day (1779–1853), American merchant
- Rowland Detrosier (1800–1834), English politician

=== E ===
- Rowland Egerton-Warburton (1804–1891), English landowner
- Rowland Ellis (1650–1731), Welsh religious figure
- Rowland Ellis (bishop) (1841–1911), Welsh bishop
- Rowland Eustace (1505–1578), Irish politician
- Rowland Evans (1921–2001), American journalist

=== F ===
- Rowland Fernyhough (born 1954), British equestrian
- Rowland Fisher (1885–1969), English painter
- Rowland FitzEustace (1430–1496), Irish judge
- Rowland Fraser (1890–1916), Scottish rugby union footballer
- Rowland Frazee (1921–2007), Canadian banker
- Rowland G. Freeman III (1922–2014), American naval officer

=== G ===
- Rowland Garrett (born 1950), American basketball player
- Rowland George (1905–1997), British rower
- Rowland Greenberg (1920–1994), Norwegian musician
- Rowland Griffiths (1886–1914), Welsh rugby union footballer
- Rowland Gwynne (1658–1728), Welsh politician

=== H ===
- Rowland Hanson, American corporate executive
- Rowland Harrison (1841–1897), English poet
- Rowland Harrold (1865–1924), Australian dermatologist
- Rowland Hassall (1768–1820), English missionary
- Rowland Hayward (1520–1593), English merchant
- Rowland Hazard (disambiguation), multiple people
- Rowland Heylyn (1562–1631), English merchant
- Rowland Hilder (1905–1993), English artist
- Rowland Hill (disambiguation), multiple people
- Rowland Hodge (1859–1950), English shipbuilder
- Rowland Holle (1859–1929), New Zealand cricketer
- Rowland Holt (1723–1786), British politician
- Rowland Hood (1911–1969), British politician
- Rowland S. Howard (1959–2009), Australian musician
- Rowland Hughes (1896–1957), American politician
- Rowland Hunt (1858–1943), English politician

=== J ===
- Rowland H. Jackson (1872–1957), American businessman and politician
- Rowland Louis Johnston (1872–1939), American politician
- Rowland Jones (1722–1774), Welsh lawyer
- Rowland Jones (golfer) (1871–1952), English golfer
- Rowland Jones-Bateman (1826–1896), English cricketer

=== K ===
- Rowland C. Kellogg (1843–1911), American politician
- Rowland Kenney (1882–1961), British diplomat

=== L ===
- Rowland Langmaid (1897–1956), British seaman
- Rowland Laugharne (1607–1675), Welsh soldier
- Rowland Lee (disambiguation), multiple people
- Rowland Leigh (1902–1963), English screenwriter
- Rowland Leigh (MP) (??–1603), English politician
- Rowland Lockey (1565–1616), English painter
- Rowland Lytton (1615–1674), English politician

=== M ===
- Rowland Hussey Macy (1822–1877), American businessman
- Rowland B. Mahany (1864–1937), American politician
- Rowland Mainwaring (1850–1926), British army officer
- Rowland Mainwaring (Royal Navy officer) (1783–1862), English naval officer
- Rowland Makati (born 2001), Kenyan footballer
- Rowland Ap Meredydd (1529–1600), Welsh politician
- Rowland Meyrick (1505–1566), Welsh bishop
- Rowland Molony (born 1946), British poet
- Rowland Money-Kyrle (1866–1928), English archdeacon
- Rowland Percy Moss, American economist
- Rowland Musson (1912–1943), English cricketer

=== N ===
- Rowland Needham (1878–1963), English cricketer
- Rowland Nugent (1861–1948), English naval officer

=== O ===
- Rowland Office (born 1952), American baseball player
- Rowland Mason Ordish (1824–1886), English engineer

=== P ===
- Rowland Parker (1912–1989), English historian
- Rowland Pennington (1870–1929), English footballer
- Rowland Perkins (1934–2018), American talent agent
- Rowland Pettit (1927–1981), Australian-American chemist
- Rowland Phillips (disambiguation), multiple people
- Rowland Plumbe (1838–1919), English architect
- Rowland Powell-Williams (1872–1951), English cricketer
- Rowland Prichard (1811–1887), Welsh musician
- Rowland Prothero (1851–1937), British politician
- Rowland Pugh (1579–??), Welsh politician

=== R ===
- Rowland Raw (1884–1915), English cricketer
- Rowland Rees (1840–1904), Australian architect
- Rowland Henry Rerick (1857-1925) American newspaper publisher and historian
- Rowland Rivron (born 1958), British comedian
- Rowland Richard Robbins (1872–1960), English farmer
- Rowland Robinson (1833–1900), American farmer
- Rowland Ryder (1914–1996), English schoolmaster

=== S ===
- Rowland Salley (born 1949), American musician
- Rowland Glave Saunders (1873–1952), English surgeon
- Rowland Scherman (born 1937), American photographer
- Rowland Searchfield (1565–1622), English bishop
- Rowland Shaddick (1920–1994), English cricketer
- Rowland Smith (1826–1901), English politician
- Rowland Southern (1882–1935), English biologist
- Rowland Sperling (1874–1965), British diplomat
- Rowland Stephenson (disambiguation), multiple people
- Rowland St John (1588–1645), English politician
- Rowland Suddaby (1912–1972), British artist
- Rowland Sutherland, British musician

=== T ===
- Rowland Talbot, British screenwriter
- Rowland Taylor (1510–1555), English religious figure
- Rowland Thomas (1621–1698), English colonist
- Rowland E. Trowbridge (1821–1881), American politician

=== V ===
- Rowland Vaughan (disambiguation), multiple people
- Rowland Venables (1846–1920), English cricketer

=== W ===
- Rowland Ward (1848–1912), British taxidermist
- Rowland White (disambiguation), multiple people
- Rowland Whitehead (disambiguation), multiple people
- Rowland Whyte (??–1626), English businessman
- Rowland Williams (disambiguation), multiple people
- Rowland Wilson (disambiguation), multiple people
- Rowland Winn (disambiguation), multiple people
- Rowland Winter (born 1985), British rugby union coach
- Rowland Wolfe (1914–2010), American gymnast
- Rowland Worsley (1907–??), Australian politician
- Rowland Wright (1915–1991), British industrialist

=== Y ===
- Rowland York (??–1588), English soldier

== See also ==
- Rowland (disambiguation), a disambiguation page for "Rowland"
- Rowland (surname), a page for people with the surname "Rowland"
