= Rowland Davis =

Rowland Davis may refer to:

- Rowland L. Davis (1871–1954), New York State Supreme Court justice
- Rowland Robert Teape Davis (c. 1807–1879), New Zealand labour reformer, hotel-keeper and politician

== See also ==
- Rowland Davies (disambiguation)
- Roland Clark Davis (1902–1961), American psychologist
