= Kealkill =

Village in County Cork, Ireland

Kealkill An Chaolchoill
- Village
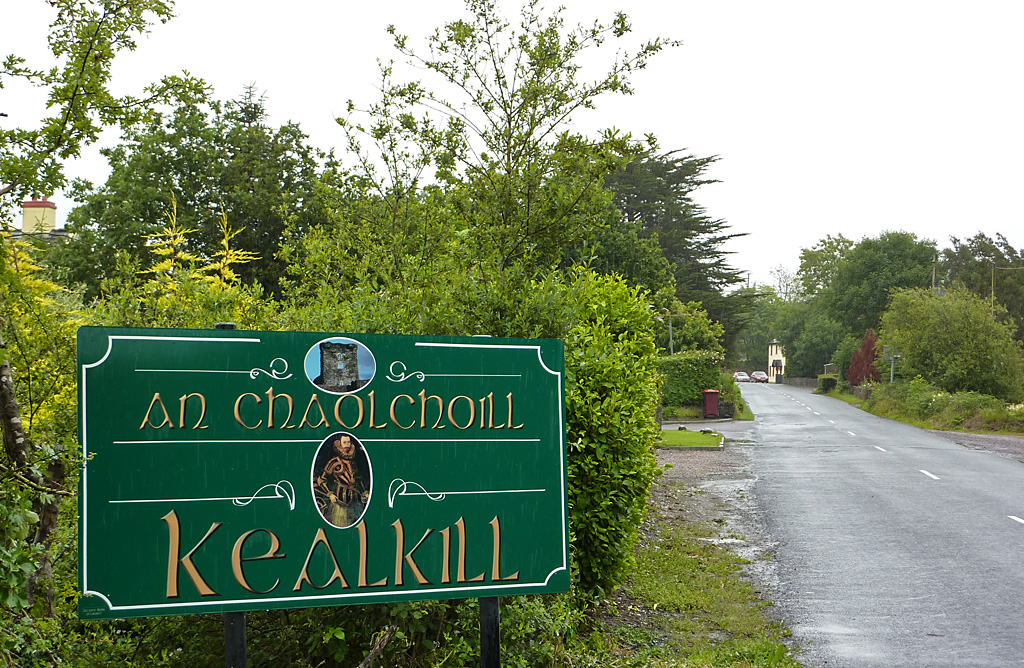
- Signage at Kealkill village

- Location in Ireland
- Coordinates: 51°45′03″N 09°22′49″W
- Country: Ireland
- Province: Munster
- County: County Cork
- Time zone: UTC+0 (WET)
  - Summer (DST): UTC-1 (IST (WEST))

Kealkill (Irish: An Chaolchoill) is a small village in County Cork, Ireland, located 10.3 kilometres from Bantry and 75.8 kilometres from Cork City. Its amenities include a church, a shop, a school, a community playgroup, two public houses and a GAA club (St Colum's).

== History ==
=== Stone circle ===
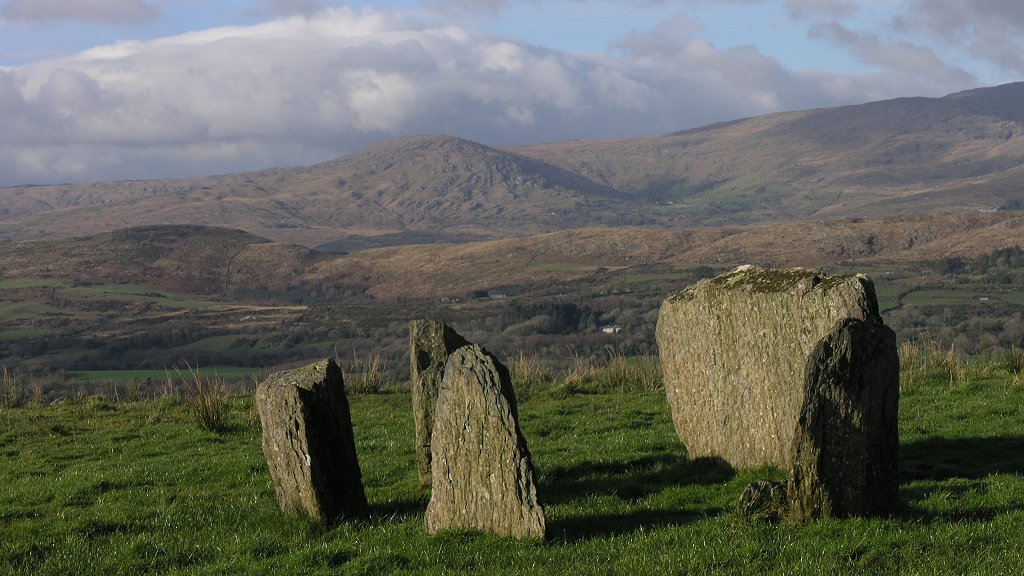
Kealkill stone circle

Kealkill stone circle is an archaeological site with a very small 5-stone recumbent stone circle, a pair of outlier standing stones, and the remains of a radial stone cairn. Breeny More Stone Circle also stands nearby, while Maughanasilly Stone Row is in the hills to the north. Visitors to the circle can view Bantry Bay to the west, Cnoc Baoi to the north and the Shehy Hills to the east. A series of walks connect the circle to Carriganass Castle and the Sheep's Head Way.

=== Irish Civil War ===
On Wednesday 19 April 1922, the first fatalities of the Irish Civil War occurred in Kealkill when two soldiers of the Republican IRA (Anti Treaty) army were killed. These were volunteers Kelly and Cronin, both from nearby Bantry.

== Notable residents ==
- Rowland Robert Teape Davis (b. 1807), advocate of Catholic emancipation, Oddfellow and New Zealand working class agitator.
- Alan O'Connor (b. 1985), Cork senior footballer and All-Ireland Senior football winner in 2010.

== See also ==
- List of towns and villages in Ireland
