= Rowland Hill (disambiguation) =

Sir Rowland Hill (1795–1879) introduced postal reforms in the UK that led to the issuance of the world's first postage stamps.

Rowland Hill or Roland Hill may also refer to:

- Rowland Hill, 1st Viscount Hill (1772–1842), commanded British units in the Napoleonic Wars and later became Commander-in-Chief
- Roland Hill (cricketer) (1868–1929), Australian cricketer
- Roland Hill (journalist) (1920–2014), British journalist and biographer
- Rowland Hill (MP) (c. 1495–1561), Lord Mayor of London and publisher of the Geneva Bible
- Sir Rowland Hill, 1st Baronet (1705–1783), first of the Hill Baronets, of Hawkstone, MP for Lichfield
- Rowland Hill (preacher) (1744–1833), nonconformist leader and vaccination advocate
- Rowland Hill, 2nd Viscount Hill (1800–1875), British peer and MP for Shropshire
- Rowland Broadhurst Hill, Australian politician
- Rowland Hill (cricketer) (1851–1912), English cricketer
- Roland E. Hill, American architect and filmmaker
- Roland E. Hill Jr., American filmmaker and son of Roland E. Hill

== See also ==
- Rowland Clegg-Hill, 3rd Viscount Hill (1833–1895), British peer
- Rowland Richard Clegg-Hill, 4th Viscount Hill (1863–1923), British peer
- Sir George Rowland Hill (1855–1928), English rugby union administrator
- Viscount Hill
