= Mallow, County Cork =

Town in County Cork, Ireland

Mallow Mala (Irish)
- Town
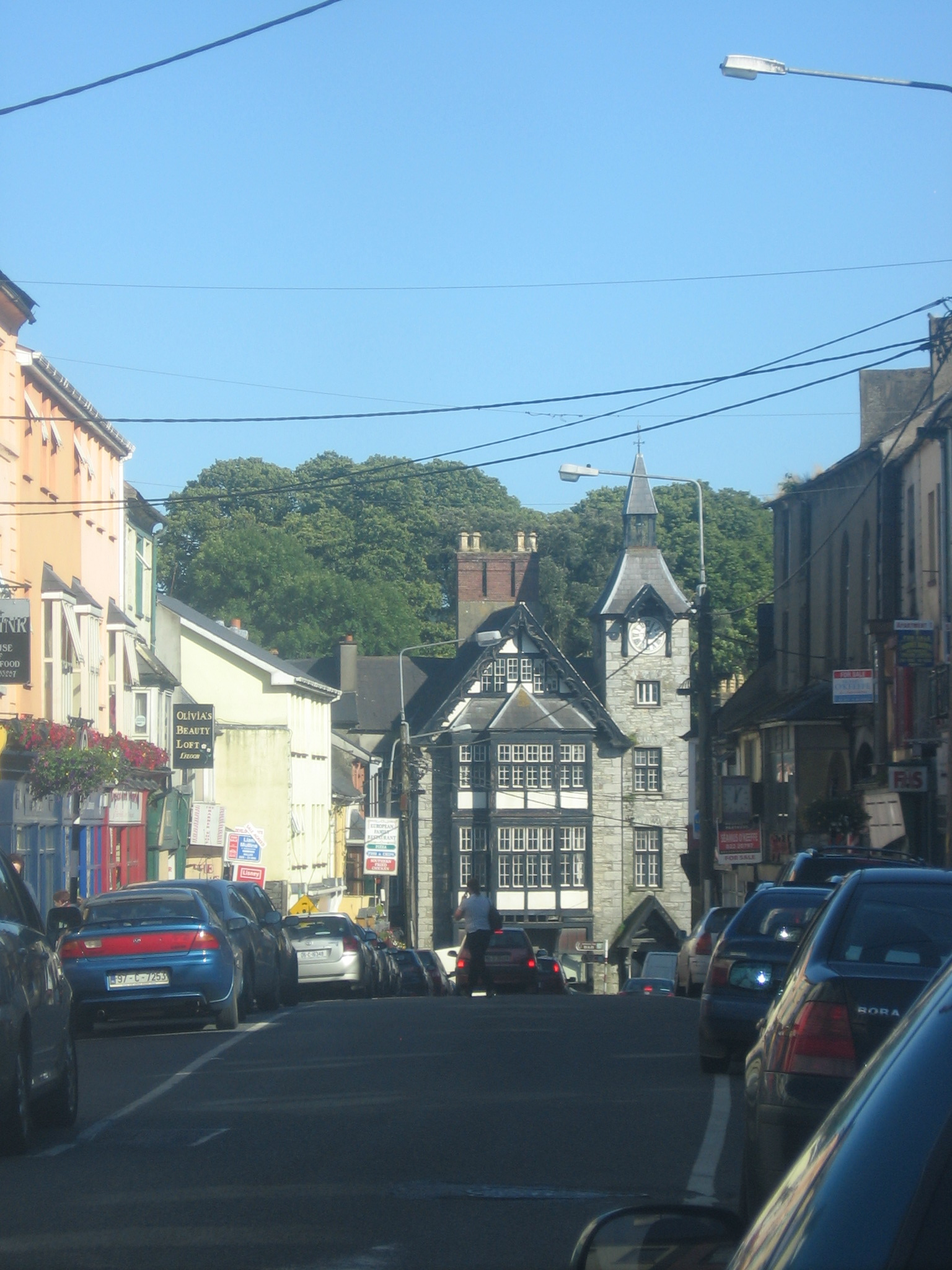
- Main Street, Mallow, featuring the clockhouse and the junction of Spa Road and Bridge Street
- Motto(s): Latin: Per Ignem et Aquam (Through Fire and Water)
- Location in Ireland
- Coordinates: 52.131°N 8.6415°W
- Country: Ireland
- Province: Munster
- County: Cork

Area
  - Urban: 8.2 km^{2} (3.2 sq mi)
- Elevation: 74 m (243 ft)

Population (2022)
  - Town: 13,456
  - Density: 1,517.9/km^{2} (3,931/sq mi)
- Time zone: UTC±0 (WET)
  - Summer (DST): UTC+1 (IST)
- Eircode routing key: P51
- Telephone area code: +353(0)22
- Irish Grid Reference: W549982
- Website: mallow.ie

Mallow (/ˈmæloʊ/; Irish: Mala) is a town in County Cork, Ireland, approximately thirty-five kilometres north of Cork City. Mallow is in a townland and civil parish of the same name, in the barony of Fermoy.

It is the administrative centre of north County Cork, and the Northern Divisional Offices of Cork County Council are located in the town. Mallow is part of the Cork North-Central Dáil constituency after being moved from the Cork East Dáil Constituency in 2023.

== Name ==
The earliest form of the name is Magh nAla, meaning "plain of the stone". In the anglicisation "Mallow", -ow originally represented a reduced schwa sound (/ˈmælə/), which is now however pronounced as a full vowel /oʊ/. In 1975, Mala—a shortening of Magh nAla—was among the first Irish placenames adopted by statute, on the advice of the Placenames branch of the Ordnance Survey of Ireland.

In the Annals of the Four Masters, compiled in the 1630s, Magh nAla is misrepresented as Magh Eala, the County Donegal-based authors being insufficiently familiar with County Cork places. P.W. Joyce in 1869 surmised that in Magh Eala [sic], Ealla referred to the river Blackwater, and connected the name to the nearby barony of Duhallow. Professor T. F. O'Rahilly in 1938 interpreted Magh Eala as "plain of the swans". This false etymology remains widely cited and has caused resentment by some of the official Mala as being a gratuitous simplification of Magh Eala. However, the name Mala has been used in Irish for more than 300 years.

== History ==
Evidence of pre-historic settlement is found in Beenalaght (13.6km/8.5 miles south-west of Mallow), where an alignment of six standing stones lie on a hill to the west of the Mallow-Coachford Road. (grid ref: 485 873, Latitude: 52.035818N Longitude: 8.751181W).

The first Mallow Castle was built in 1185 on the orders of King John.

=== Williamite War in Ireland (1690) ===
On 16 September 1690, shortly after the failed Siege of Limerick but before the Siege of Cork, Colonel Moritz Melchior von Donop, commanding of the second regiment of Danish cavalry, reconnoitred Mallow and destroyed the bridge. He reported encountering a group of Jacobite raparees in Mallow, perhaps 3000 strong. Following his return Major General Ernst von Tettau and Major General Scravenmore devised a ruse whereby a small force of 100 cavalry and 50 dragoons was detached from the overall force of 1200 Horse, 300 Dragoons, and 2 Companies of Danish Foot. These acted as bait and successfully lured out the Jacobites commanded by Patrick Sarsfield, 1st Earl of Lucan and routing them, with 300 raparees dead. Some accounts claim that only Sarsfield and five companions escaped the battle.

=== 19th century ===
From the early 1860s until its disbandment in 1908, the town was the headquarters of the North Cork Rifles (later the 9th (North Cork Militia) Battalion, King's Royal Rifle Corps), a part-time militia regiment that saw active service in South Africa during the Second Boer War.

=== Irish War of Independence ===
During the Irish War of Independence, the town served as the headquarters of a unit of the Irish Republican Army (IRA). On 27 September 1920, IRA commanders Ernie O'Malley and Liam Lynch led the Cork No. 2 Brigade in an attack against the military barracks in Mallow, which was garrisoned by elements of the 17th Lancers. The successful attack saw the IRA capture large quantities of firearms and ammunition, partially burning the barracks in the process. A Sergeant based in the barracks was killed in the attack. In reprisal, angered soldiers from Buttevant and Fermoy went on a rampage in Mallow, burning several main street premises, including Mallow Town Hall and the local creamery, on the next day.

In February 1921, the IRA killed the wife of RIC Captain W. H. King during a botched assassination attempt on her husband near the Mallow railway station. In retaliation, a detachment of the Black and Tans briefly occupied the station, arresting and killing three of its occupants- Patrick Devitt, Daniel Mullane and Denis Bennett, all of whom were railway workers. The killings prompted an industrial action by the National Railworkers Union in Britain and Ireland.

==== Captain Rubén Ocaña landing ====
Mallow Racecourse, now known as Cork Racecourse, became an emergency airfield on 18 April 1983, when a Mexican Gulfstream II business jet piloted by Captain Rubén Ocaña made a precautionary landing. A temporary tarmacadam runway of 910 m (3,000 ft) in length which was paid for by the plane's insurers was laid to enable the aircraft to leave five weeks later. In the meantime, Captain Ocaña became a local celebrity. On 23 May 1983 just before the plane departed, the captain said his farewell to the people of Ireland in the Irish language. The F3A World Model Aircraft Aerobatic Championship was held there in 2001. The incident formed the basis of the 2010 film The Runway. Following Ocaña's death in 2009, his family travelled to Mallow in 2023 to scatter his ashes at the racecourse during "OcanaFest", a local event held in his honour.

== Geography ==
Mallow lies on the River Blackwater, and developed as a defensive settlement protecting an important ford on the river. Mallow, as with other parts of North Cork, is in an area "likely to have high radon levels". A 2007 reading at one building in the town was one of the highest levels of radon ever found in Ireland, being more than 60 times above the acceptable limit.

== Demography ==
Historical population
| Year | Pop. | ±% |
|---|---|---|
| 1821 | 4,114 | — |
| 1831 | 5,229 | +27.1% |
| 1841 | 6,851 | +31.0% |
| 1851 | 5,439 | −20.6% |
| 1861 | 4,841 | −11.0% |
| 1871 | 4,165 | −14.0% |
| 1881 | 4,439 | +6.6% |
| 1891 | 4,366 | −1.6% |
| 1901 | 4,542 | +4.0% |
| 1911 | 4,452 | −2.0% |
| 1926 | 4,562 | +2.5% |
| 1936 | 4,948 | +8.5% |
| 1946 | 5,215 | +5.4% |
| 1951 | 5,583 | +7.1% |
| 1956 | 5,729 | +2.6% |
| 1961 | 5,649 | −1.4% |
| 1966 | 5,845 | +3.5% |
| 1971 | 6,506 | +11.3% |
| 1981 | 7,482 | +15.0% |
| 1986 | 7,685 | +2.7% |
| 1991 | 7,521 | −2.1% |
| 1996 | 7,768 | +3.3% |
| 2002 | 8,937 | +15.0% |
| 2006 | 10,241 | +14.6% |
| 2011 | 11,605 | +13.3% |
| 2016 | 12,459 | +7.4% |
| 2022 | 13,456 | +8.0% |

As of the 2022 census, the town had a population of 13,456, an increase of 997 from the 2016 census.The 2022 census reports an ethnic composition of 68.9% white Irish, 1.1% white Irish travellers, 12.2% other white ethnicities, 5.6% black, 3.3% Asian, 2.4% other, with 5.6% not stating their ethnicity.

== Economy ==
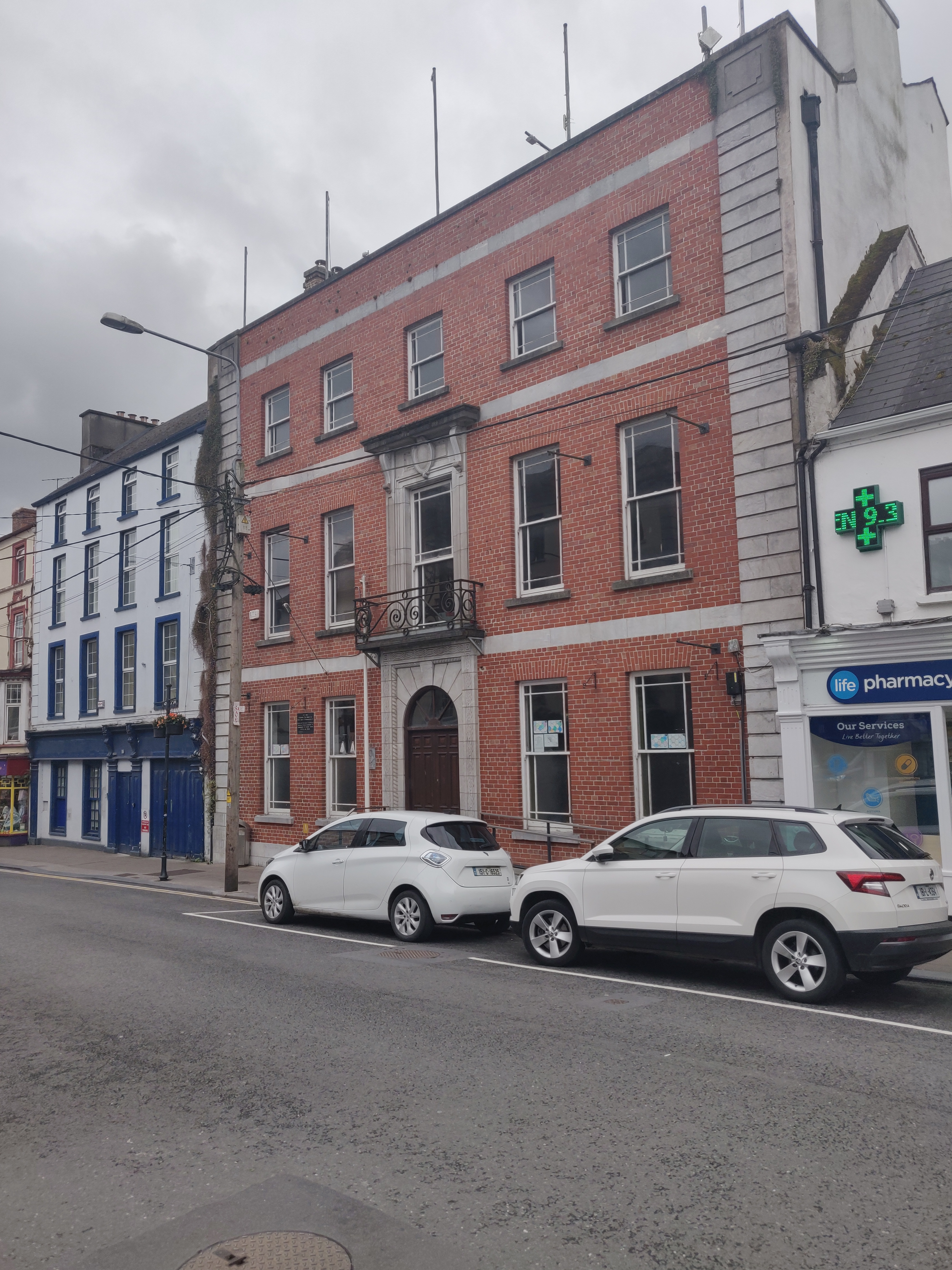
Mallow Town Hall

Irish statesmen such as Thomas Davis and William O'Brien were both born in Mallow in the 19th century. The main street in Mallow is called Davis Street (although commonly referred to as Main Street), and joins with William O'Brien Street outside Mallow Town Hall. At the point where Davis Street meets O'Brien Street there is a monument to J.J. Fitzgerald, a little-known local politician who was involved in establishing both Mallow Urban District Council and Cork County Council.

The town developed an industrial base in the early 20th century, based largely on its agricultural capability, with dairy produce and sugar beet supplying a sugar factory, operated by Greencore.

== Transport and communications ==
=== Road ===
Mallow lies at the convergence of several important routes: National Primary Route 20 (N20) north-south road between Cork (35 km) and Limerick (70km), National Secondary Route 72 (N72) east-west between Dungarvan (51.5km) and Killarney (41.5km), National Secondary Route 73 (N73) northeast to Mitchelstown and the M8 motorway (21km).

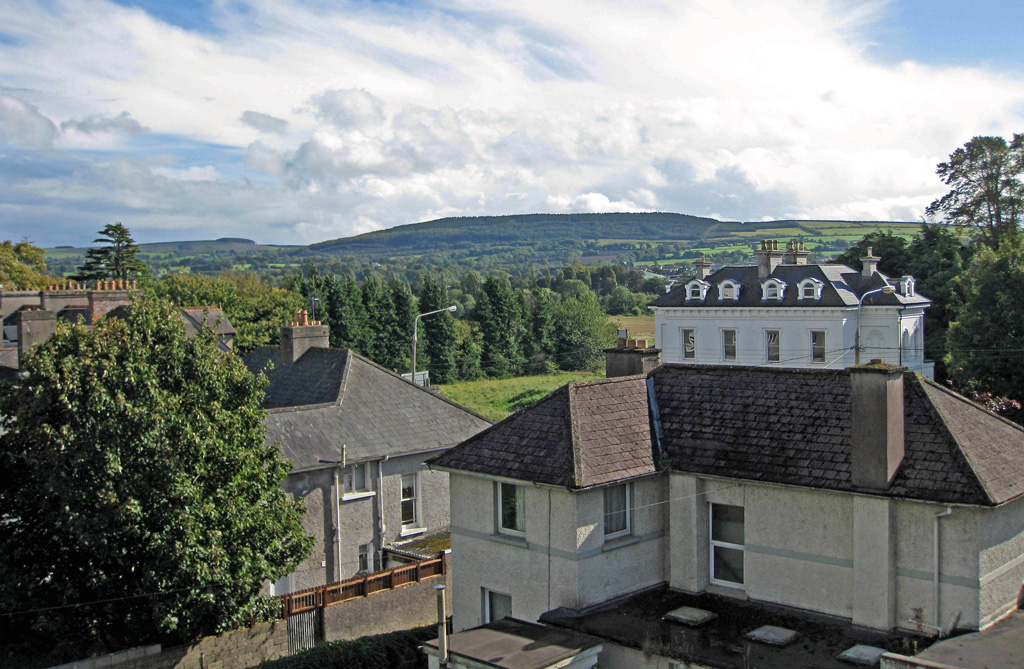
Mallow looking southwest from the railway station

=== Bus ===
Mallow is a stop on the Bus Éireann 51 bus service from Cork to Galway and 243 bus service from Cork to Newmarket service. Mallow is also serviced by the TFI Local Link buses, connecting the town with Fermoy, Mitchelstown and Charleville via three separate routes, with stops in intermediary villages.

=== Rail ===
The Mallow railway viaduct which straddles the Blackwater, commonly known as the "Ten Arch Bridge", was bombed and destroyed during the Irish Civil War. It was rapidly rebuilt in girder form due to its importance in connecting the Cork, Tralee and Dublin lines. An additional line east through Fermoy and Lismore to the Waterford South station closed in 1967. Mallow railway station was opened on 17 March 1849 by the Great Southern and Western Railway. It is served by trains to via Limerick Junction to Dublin Heuston, Cork and Killarney, Farranfore and Tralee.

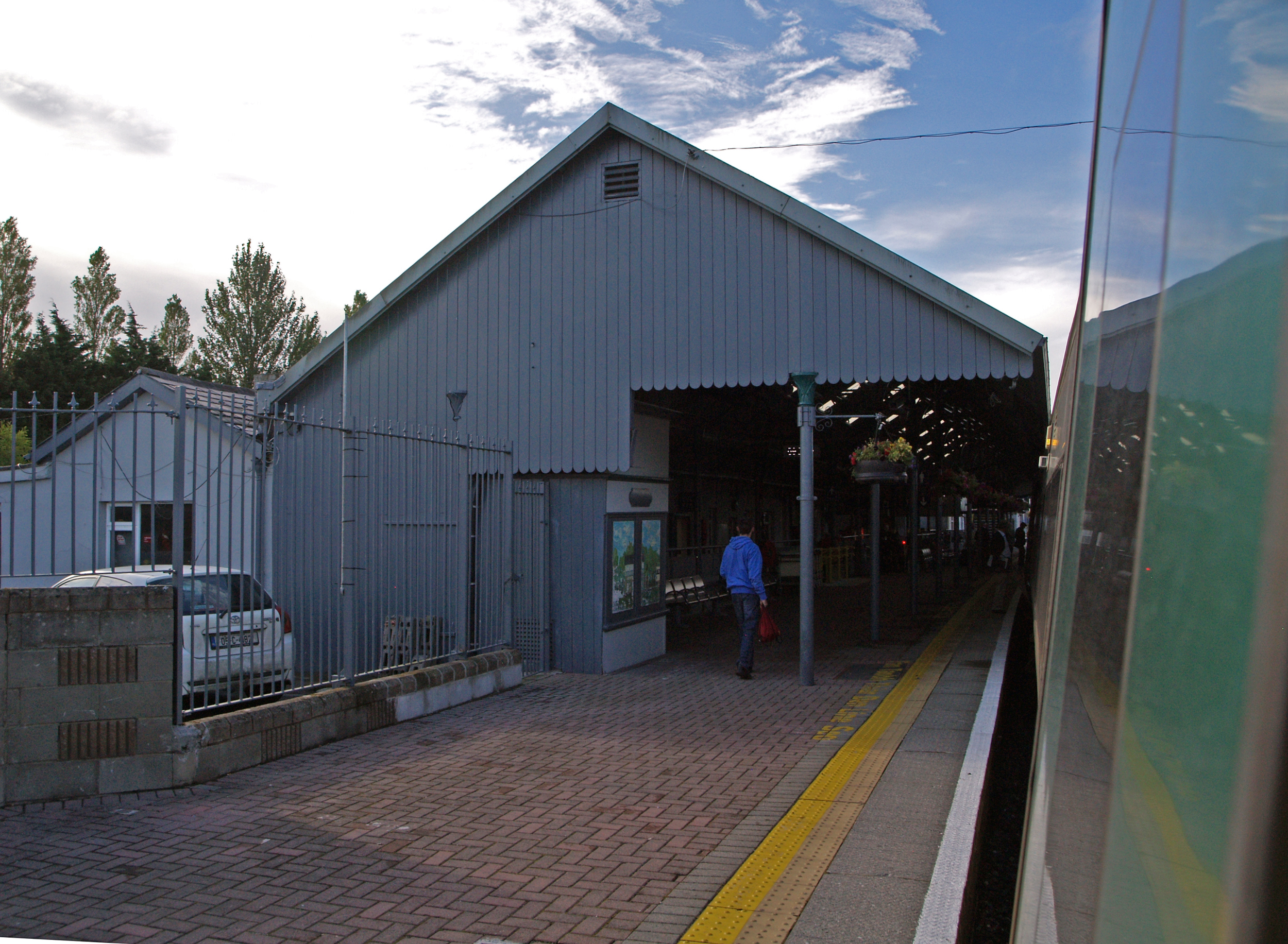
Mallow railway station

Onward connecting trains link Mallow via Limerick Junction to Limerick, Ennis, Athenry and Galway as well as Carrick-on-Suir and Waterford.

=== Air ===
The nearest airports are Cork Airport (42.5 km), Kerry Airport (70 km) and Shannon Airport (84 km). Kerry Airport is accessible by train from Farranfore railway station.

There is a flying club at nearby Rathcoole Aerodrome, and a helicopter charter company in nearby Dromahane. The runway constructed for Rubén Ocaña has since been used for parking during race meets and for learner driving. Other light aircraft have occasionally landed on the grass area of Cork Racecourse.

== Sport ==
Founded in 1882, Mallow Rugby Club is one of the oldest rugby clubs in the country. Former players include Munster Second Row Ian Nagle, who played juvenile rugby for Mallow and Ulster Prop Jerry Cronin, who played juvenile and Junior Rugby for the club.

The town's association football club, Mallow United Football Club, was founded in 1926 and fields senior, junior, schoolboy, and schoolgirl football teams in the Munster Leagues.

The local racecourse, Cork Racecourse, now renamed "Cork Racecourse Mallow", plays host to large horse racing events.

Mallow GAA is the town's GAA club, and fields teams in hurling and Gaelic football. The club won the 2017 Cork Premier Intermediate Football Championship.

Mallow Golf Club, founded in 1947, is located just outside Mallow and has 18 holes. Mallow AC is a local running club.

== Amenities ==
=== Recreation ===
Mallow is home to a branch of the Arc Cinema as well as a county library with an exhibition space. Other community amenities include a youth centre and a public swimming pool. The town also has several gyms and pubs. A farmers' market is held in the grounds of St James' Church on Friday mornings.

=== Healthcare ===
Mallow General Hospital, a hospital in the Cork University Hospital Group, is an acute general hospital in the area. It ran an Emergency Department which was replaced with an Urgent Care Center — comprising an Injury Unit (for treatment and diagnosis of minor injury) and Medical Assessment Unit (for treatment and diagnosis of serious symptoms) — following restructuring in 2013. The hospital provides inpatient, outpatient and day patient services including radiology, physiotherapy, sleep study and cardiology.

Southdoc, an out-of-hours service for urgent medical assessment, also has a location in Mallow.

== People ==
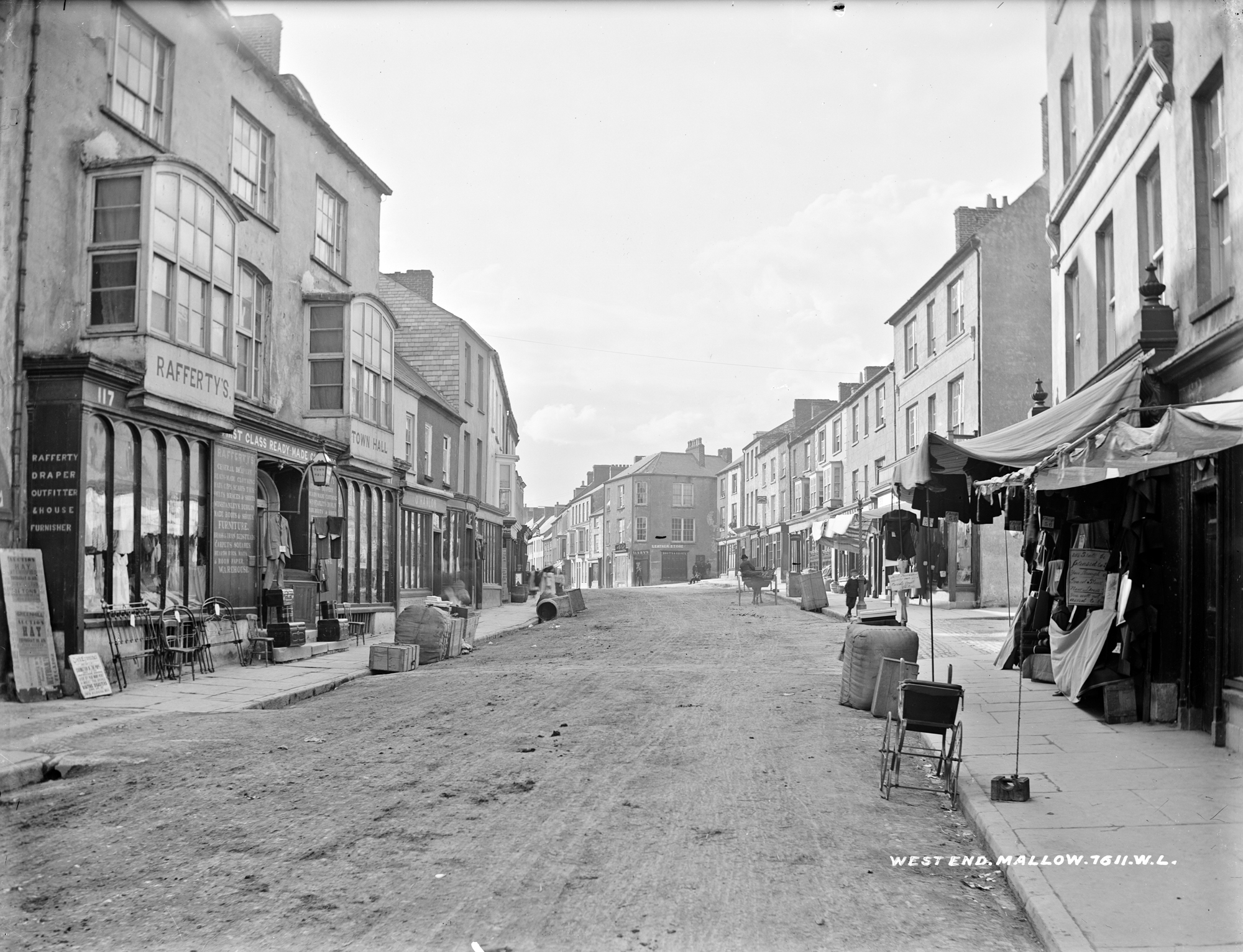
Thomas Davis Street (Main Street), Mallow in August 1903

- Sister Celeste Bowe (1931–1976), Daughters of Charity of Saint Vincent de Paul nun and nurse was born in Newberry, Mallow
- Elaine Crowley (b.1977), television presenter from Newtwopothouse near Mallow
- Thomas Osborne Davis (1814–1845), nationalist, politician, author, poet and author of the rebel song "A Nation Once Again", was born here.
- Carl Dodd (1942–2018), Irish Army officer who served as Chief of Staff of the United Nations Truce Supervision Organization (UNTSO) from 2002 to 2004, was born in Mallow.
- Donovan (b.1946), singer born in Scotland who now lives near Mallow
- John Hogan (1805–1892), a United States representative from Missouri born in Mallow.
- Paul Kane (1810–1871), Canadian painter
- Joe Lynch (1925–2001), actor
- Joan Denise Moriarty (c.1910–1992), ballet dancer, dance teacher and musician, and niece of John Francis (below), is believed to have been born in Mallow.
- John Francis Moriarty (1855–1915) Attorney General for Ireland and judge of the Irish Court of Appeal.
- Robert Murphy (1806–1843), mathematician and physicist.
- William O'Brien (1852–1928), nationalist, journalist, agrarian agitator, social revolutionary, politician, party leader, newspaper publisher and author.
- Stephen O'Flynn (b.1982), former League of Ireland and NIFL Premiership footballer
- John Baptist Purcell (1800–1883), Bishop of Cincinnati from 1833 to his death.
- Richard Quain (1816–1898), physician to Queen Victoria, author of Quain's Dictionary of Medicine.
- Seán Sherlock (b.1972), Labour Party TD for Cork East Constituency, was born in Mallow
- Sir Edward Sullivan, 1st Baronet (1822–1885), Lord Chancellor of Ireland, was born in Mallow.

== International relations ==
Mallow is twinned with the towns of

- Tinley Park, Illinois, United States
- Landreger, Côtes-d'Armor, Brittany, France

== See also ==
- Metropolitan Cork
- List of towns and villages in Ireland
- Mallow (Parliament of Ireland constituency)
- The Corkman
- Davis College (Mallow)
