= LaGrange Standard =

LaGrange Standard & News
- Type: Weekly Newspaper
- Owner: Don Hurd
- Founder: John K. Marrow
- Publisher: LaGrange Publishing
- Editor-in-chief: Desirée Beauchamp
- Founded: 1856
- Headquarters: LaGrange, IN
- Circulation: 5,200
- Website: https://www.lagrangenewsonline.com/

The LaGrange Standard & News is a newspaper located in LaGrange, Indiana, United States. The newspaper serves all of LaGrange County and covers local news, sports, business, and community events. It is published weekly on Mondays and delivered via the United States Postal Service. The Standard was founded by John K. Marrow in 1856. It became the first Republican newspaper in LaGrange County. The newspaper is known for its coverage on reform of laws, local railroad development, abolition of saloons, the progressive movement in 1912, and municipal improvements. The Standard is notably cited in the book Shipshewana: an Indiana Amish Community for their coverage on the Amish community in LaGrange County.

== Ownership history ==
- John K. Marrow: 1857–1859
- John D. Defrees: 1859–1860
- Charles O. Meyers: 1860–1863
- Thomas S. Taylor: 1863–1867
- John H. Rerick: 1867–1869
- John D. Devor: 1869–1872
- John D. Rerick: 1872–1911
- Rowland H. Rerick: 1914–1925
- William Connelly
- Don Hurd
