= Beenalaght =

Six standing stones in County Cork, Ireland

Coordinates: 52°2′8.94″N 8°45′4.25″W

Beenalaght (or An Seisear, meaning The Six) is an alignment of six standing stones located on a flat pasture in Reanthesure, 0.5km west of the village of Bweeng, County Cork, Ireland. It is 13.6km (8.5 miles) south-west of Mallow, on a hill to the west of the Mallow-Coachford Road. (grid ref: 485 873, Latitude: 52.035818N Longitude: 8.751181W)

== Sources ==
- McNally, Kenneth (2006). "Ireland's Ancient Stones" (Belfast: Appletree Press). ISBN 0-86281-996-2
