= Carriganass Castle =

Tower house in County Cork, Ireland

Coordinates: 51.754°N 9.379°W

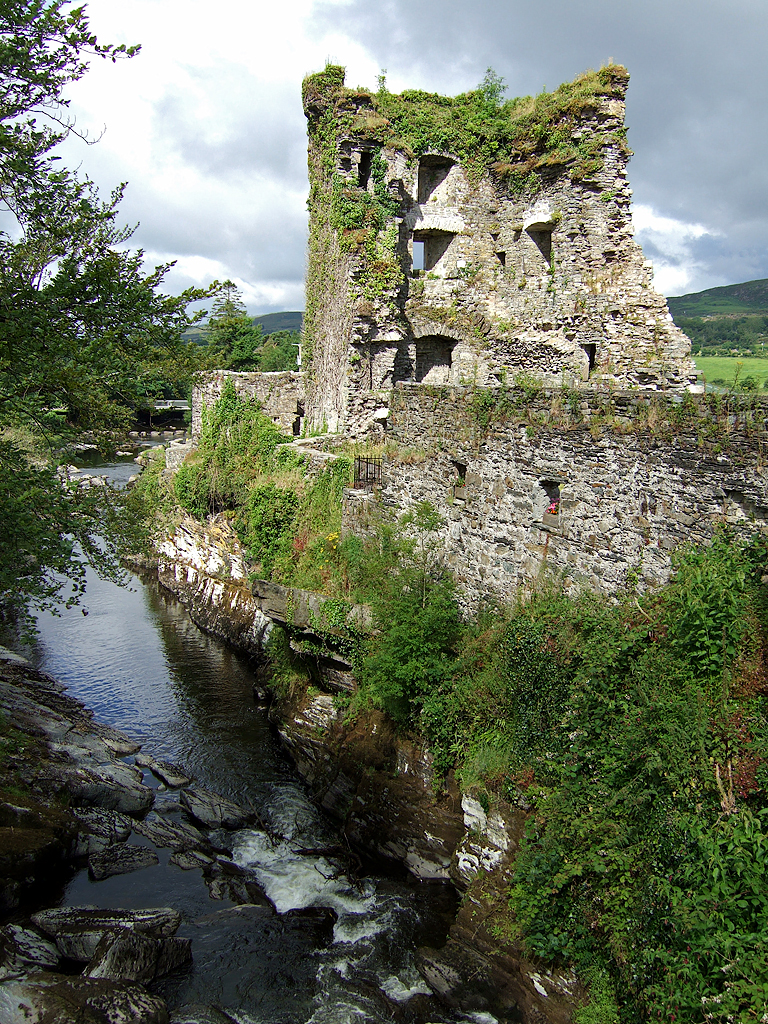
Carriganass castle

Carriganass Castle (Caisleán Charraig an Easa in Irish, meaning The Castle on the Rock of the Waterfall) is a 16th-century tower house in County Cork. It is situated about 8 kilometres north-east of Bantry, close to the village of Kealkill, in West Cork.

== History ==
Carriganass Castle was probably built in 1540 by Dermot O'Sullivan, a member of the O'Sullivan Beare sept (or clan), who wielded considerable power in West Cork during the 16th century and early 17th century. The castle passed through the hands of various members of the O'Sullivan clan during a period of internal feuding lasting until 1601, when the O'Sullivans united to support Hugh O'Neill at the Battle of Kinsale. Following the English victory at Kinsale, one of the commanders, Sir George Carew, pursued the O'Sullivan forces back to their base on the Beara Peninsula. A small garrison was left at Carriganass while the bulk of the O'Sullivan force returned to Dunboy Castle; Carew's army easily captured Carriganass before continuing on to lay siege to Dunboy. The O'Sullivans were subsequently dispossessed, and the castle later passed into the ownership of the Barretts, who retained it until the 1930s. During their tenure, a new house was built next to the castle, which deteriorated into its present ruinous state.

== Architecture ==
Carriganass Castle is a typical 16th-century Irish tower house, with a 4-storey tower surrounded by a 14-foot-high outer curtain wall or bawn. The main tower is perched on a rock overhanging the Ouvane river, and has 4 corner turrets. The main entrance to the castle was via a gate in the north wall of the bawn, which had 4 corner towers, the main tower being set into the west wall of the bawn. The castle is now in ruins, with parts of the main tower collapsed.

== Carriganass Walks ==
Carriganass Castle marks the intersection of a number of key West Cork walking routes. The Beara-Breifne Way charts O'Sullivan Bere's march from West Cork to Leitrim on his way to join the Flight of the Earls. From Carriganass you can join loop walks which are part of the Sheep's Head Way network of walking routes. The castle also marks the midpoint of St. Finbarr's Way, a pilgrim path which traces St. Finbarr's journey from Drimoleague to Gougane Barra.

== See also ==
- List of castles in Ireland
