= Castlenalacht Stone Row =

Stone row in Cork, Ireland

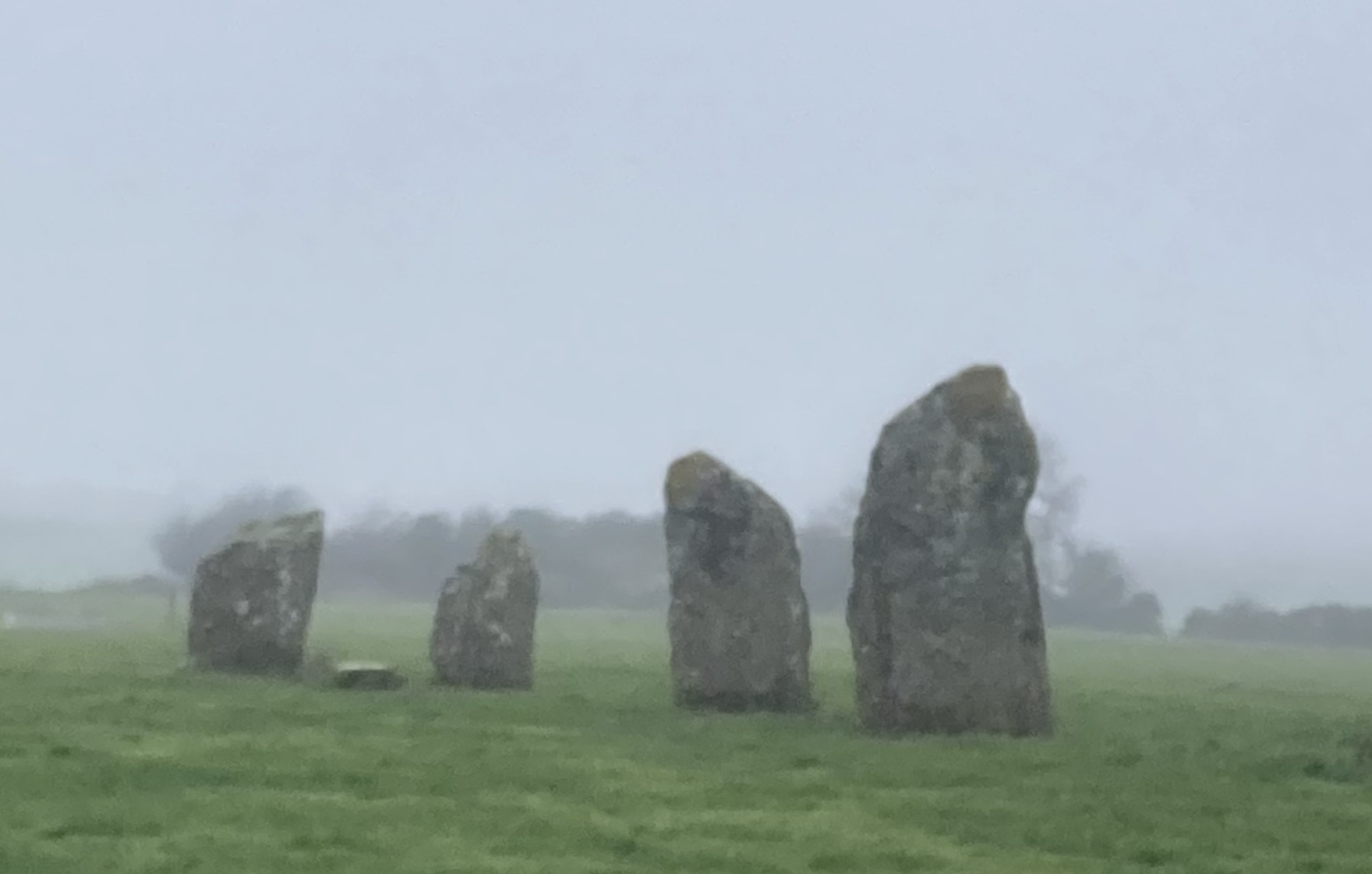
- View looking north-east
- Interactive map of Castlenalacht Stone Row
- Type: Stone row
- Periods: Bronze Age
- Location: Parish of Innishannon, County Cork
- Region: Ireland

Site notes
- Condition: Good
- Owner: Private
- Public access: Yes

Castlenalacht Stone Row is an alignment (or stone row) of four tall and free-standing stones located on a hilltop in the townland of Castlenalacht, Innishannon parish, 6 km north of Bandon, County Cork, Ireland. It dates from the Bronze Age (c. 3000–4000 years ago) and is the largest of the over 80 stone rows in south-west Ireland.

== Description ==
The four Castlenalacht stones are arranged in ascending order of height across a distance of 13.4 m (44 ft). They measure from 3.4 m (11 ft) to 13.4 m (44 ft), making the row the largest, in both length and height, in the south-west Ireland region where the majority of Irish stone rows are found. The site is placed on one of the area's highest hilltops; according to the archaeologist Clive Ruggles, the builders tended to favour locations where the axis, from largest to smallest stone, leads to a relatively distant (usually more than 5.0 km (3.1 mi) away) horizon.

A fifth and much smaller stone lying prostrate between the smaller two is of a different type of stone and can be assumed to have been placed at a later date.

== Dating and function ==
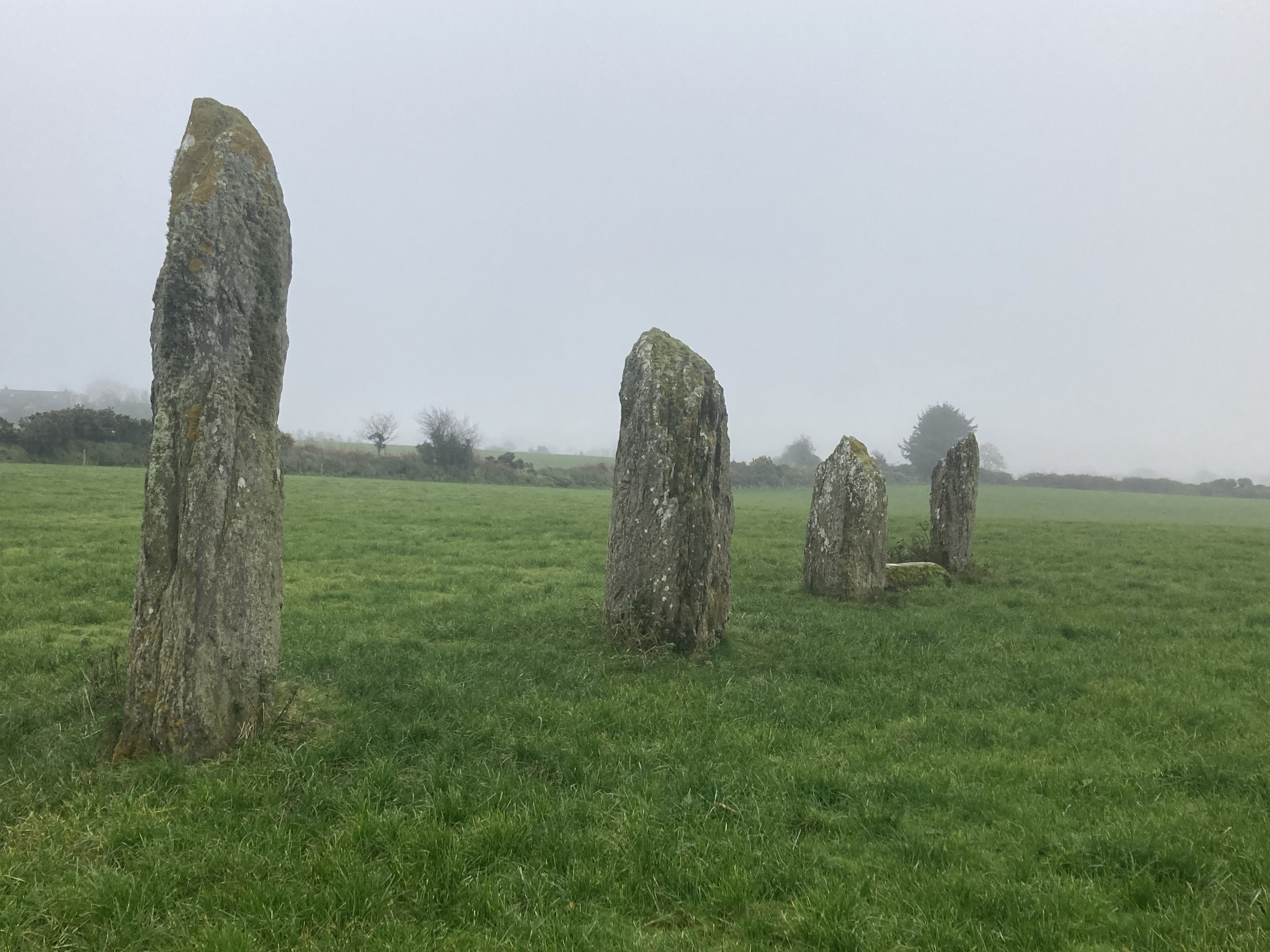
Castlenalacht Stone row

Like all stone rows in Ireland, the Castlenalacht stones were erected in the Bronze Age (c. 3000–4000 years ago, during the same period that stone circles were built) and is aligned on a north-east/south-west axis, with the largest stone positioned at the south-east side. Unusually, the Castlenalacht stones are positioned slightly off their axis. The precise functions of these constructions are unknown; most archaeologists assume a ceremonial or ritualistic purpose.

A nearby field contains a large and near contemporary boulder-burial stone, known as the "Garranes Boulder burial", which is supported by three smaller stones measuring from 40 cm (16 in) to 60 cm (24 in) in height.

== Sources ==
- Ó Nualláin, Seán. "Stone Rows in the South of Ireland". Proceedings of the Royal Irish Academy: Archaeology, Culture, History, Literature, volume 88C, 1988. JSTOR 25516044
- Power, Denis. Archaeological Heritage of County Cork. Cork County Council, 2020. ISBN 978-1-91167-701-7
- Power, Denis. Archaeological inventory of County Cork, Volume 3: Mid Cork. Stationery Office, 1992. ISBN 978-0-7076-4933-7
- Ruggles, Clive. "The Stone Rows of South-west Ireland: A First Reconnaissance". Journal for the History of Astronomy, Archaeoastronomy, Supplement, volume 25, 1994
