= Eightercua =

Stone tomb in Ireland

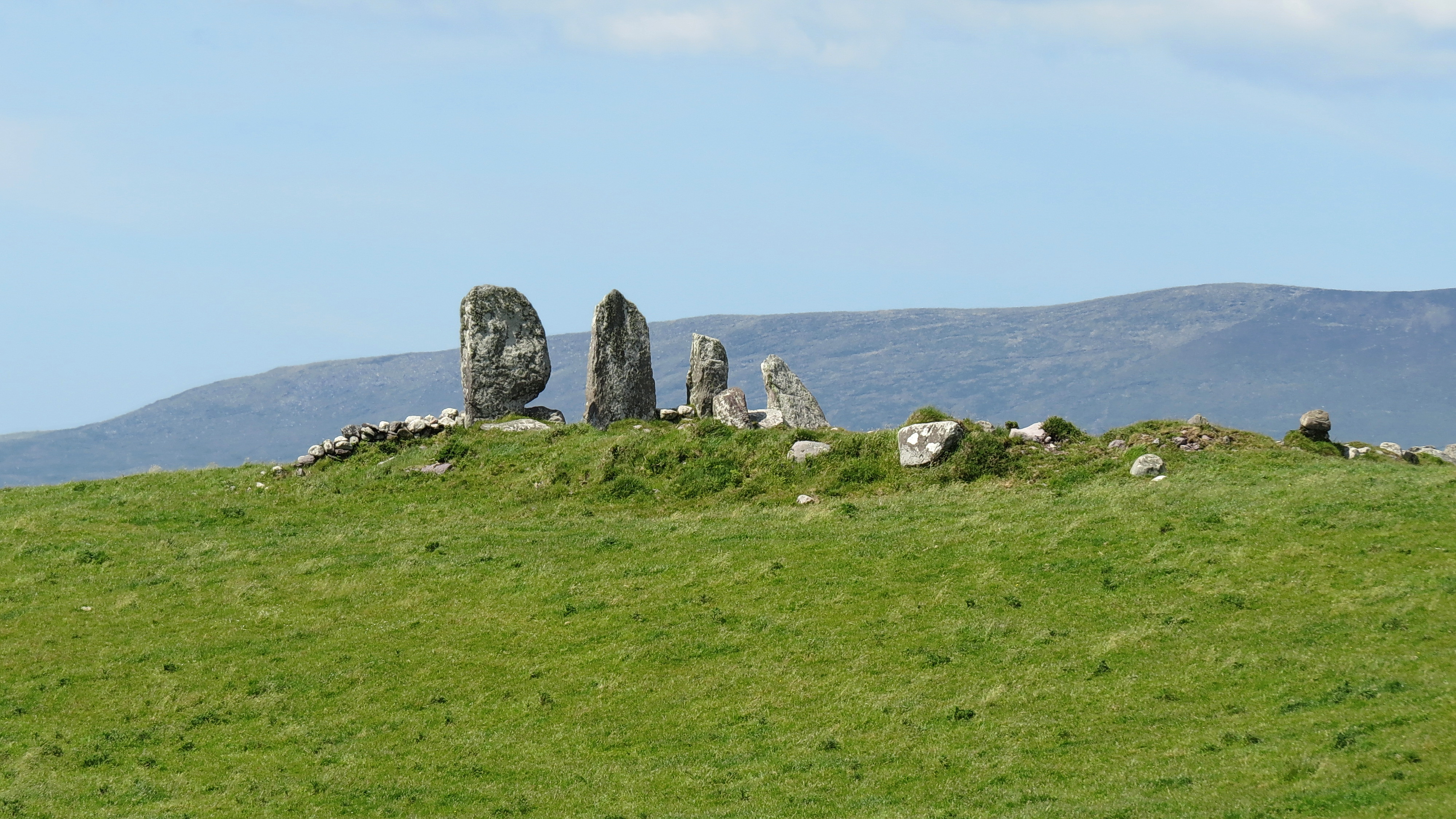
- The stone row in 2015

- Location in Ireland
- 51°48′54″N 10°09′29″W
- Type: Stone row
- Location: Kerry, Ireland

History
- Built: c. 1700 BC

Site notes
- Material: Stone

Eightercua Irish: Íoċtar Ċua (or possibly Íoċtar Ċuan), meaning ' "the place or holy place or harbor" that is Íoċ or "below" - the word is a specifically geographical term that does not adequately translate into English which does not designate a "place down below" with categorically geographical differentiation') is a four-stone alignment (stone-row) Megalithic tomb, located 1.5 km south-south-east of Waterville, Kerry, Ireland. The tallest stone reaches 10 feet in height, and the alignment streaches for 25 feet in an east-west direction. Surrounding artifacts, including remains of a possible tomb and an ancient enclosure, suggest that the site had a ritual purpose at one time. Eightercua is thought to originate from around 1700 BC, and by tradition is the burial place of Scéine, wife of the leader of the Milesian invaders, Amergin mac Míled.

The site features four tall slabs from 1.8 to 3 meters high running east and west. From one stone a slab runs south and could be part of a tomb chamber or cist set in an oval cairn 1 meter high.
