= Mallow Town Hall =

Municipal building in Mallow, County Cork, Ireland

- Halla an Bhaile Mhala
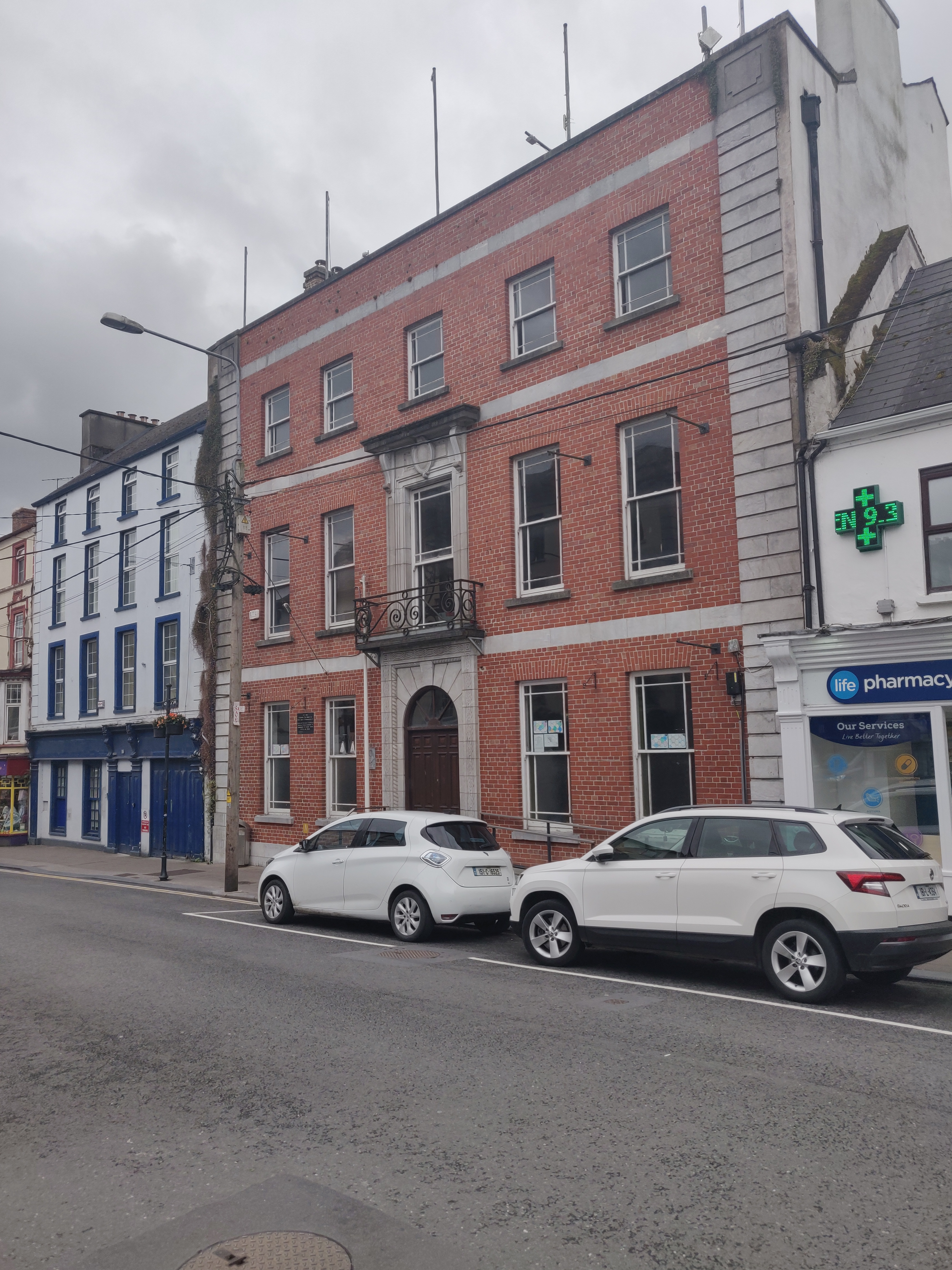
- Mallow Town Hall

- Location within County Cork

General information
- Architectural style: Neoclassical style
- Location: Davis Street, Mallow, Ireland
- Coordinates: 52.1363°N 8.6431°W
- Completed: c.1930

Mallow Town Hall (Irish: Halla an Bhaile Mhala) is a municipal building in Davis Street in Mallow, County Cork, Ireland. It is currently disused, although Cork County Council have announced that it will be converted for use as a theatre and multi-use arts centre.

== History ==
The first municipal building in the town was a market house on the south side of Davis Street near the junction with Bridge Street and Spa Walk. It was erected in about 1800 and expanded in 1840. The design involved a symmetrical main frontage of five bays facing onto Davis Street. It was open on the ground floor, so markets could be held, with an assembly room on the first floor.

In the mid-19th century, civic leaders decided to commission a dedicated town hall; the site chosen was further to the northwest along Davis Street. The design involved a symmetrical main frontage of three bays facing onto Davis Street. The central bay featured a round headed opening, which was flanked by empty niches. There was a Diocletian window on the first floor and a bi-partite sash window with a moulded surround on the second floor. The outer bays were fenestrated by bay windows on the ground and first floors and by bi-partite sash windows with moulded surrounds on the second floor. There were three dormer windows at roof level.

The building became the headquarters of Mallow Urban District Council when it was established under the leadership of the first chairman, J. Joseph Fitzgerald, in 1902. Following Fitzgerald's death in 1906, a monument designed by John Maguire to commemorate his life was erected in front of the town hall.

During the Irish War of Independence, the town served as the headquarters of the North Cork Militia (also known as North Cork Rifles), a unit of the Irish Republican Army. On 27 September, led by IRA commanders Ernie O'Malley and Liam Lynch, Cork No. 2 Brigade attacked the military barracks in the town, where elements of the 17th Lancers were based. In response, British soldiers burnt the town hall the following day.

After the war the council decided to clear the ruins of the old building and to erect a new town hall on the same site. The new building was designed in the neoclassical style, built in red brick and was completed in around 1930. The central bay featured a round headed doorway with voussoirs, a keystone and a finely carved stone surround. There was a French door with a balcony and a cornice on the first floor and a sash window on the second floor. The other bays were fenestrated by sash windows on all three floors.

Following implementation of the Local Government Act 2001, under which the urban district council was succeeded by Mallow Town Council, the town hall became the offices of the new council. The building became vacant after the town council was abolished in 2014. In August 2024, Cork County Council announced that the town hall would be converted for use as a theatre and multi-use arts centre.
