= Rowland Lee =

Rowland Lee or Leigh may refer to:

- Rowland Lee (bishop) (c. 1487–1543), English bishop
- Rowland Leigh (MP) (died 1603), English Member of Parliament for Cricklade, 1584
- Rowland V. Lee (1891–1975), American film director
- Rowland Leigh (1902–1963), English-American screenwriter
- Rowland Thomas Lovell Lee (1920–2005), English judge and poet
- Rowland Lee (composer) (born 1960), British composer

== See also ==
- Roland Lee (born 1964), English swimmer
