= Stalldown Barrow =

Megalithic site in Devon, England

Coordinates: 50.44181°N 3.93072°W

Stalldown Barrow, sometimes called Staldon, is a megalithic site in Devon, about 5 kilometres (3 mi) from Harford. It consists of a long stone row. It is fairly close to the stone circle on Stall Moor.

== Gallery ==
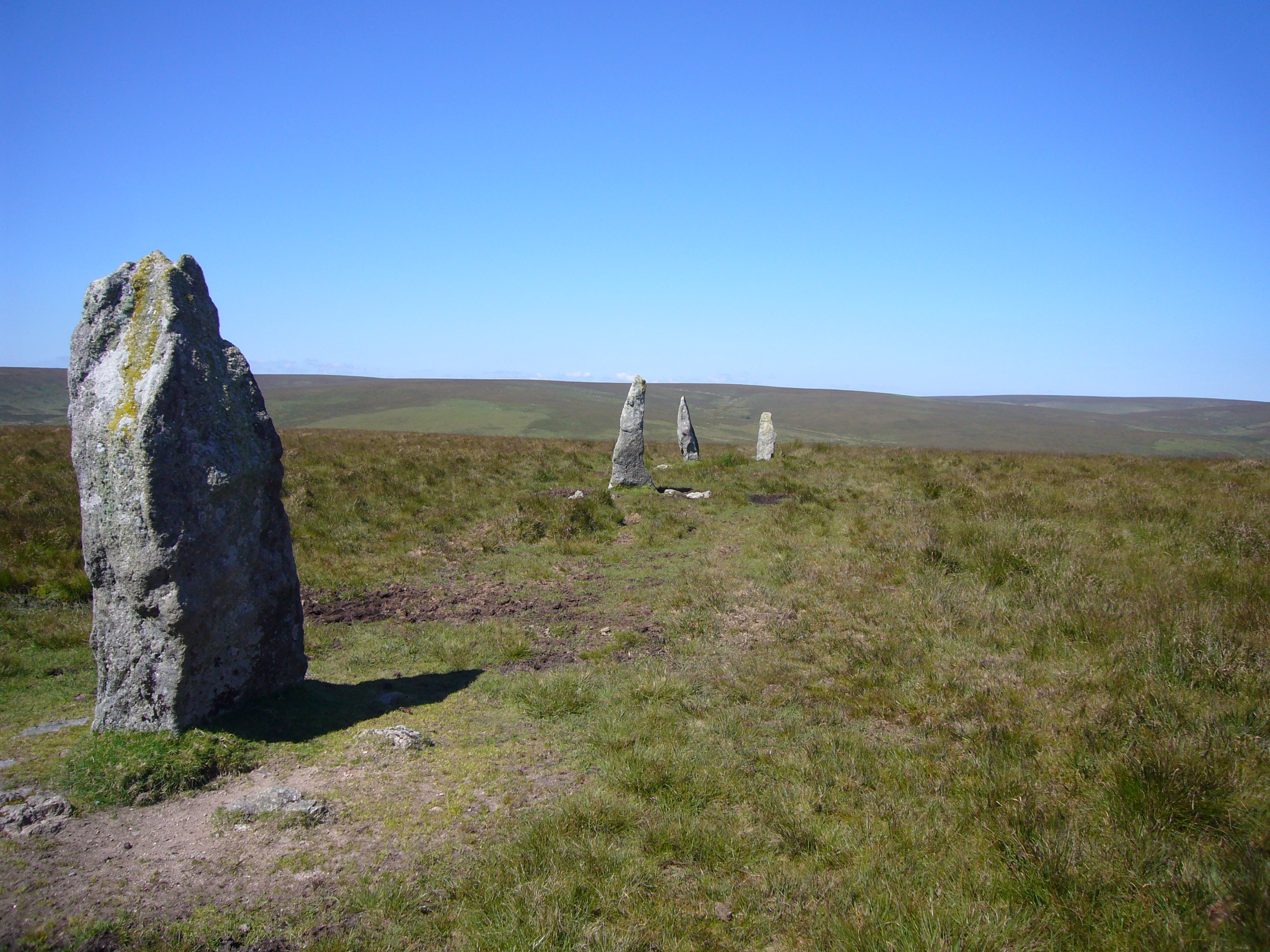
Stall moor row

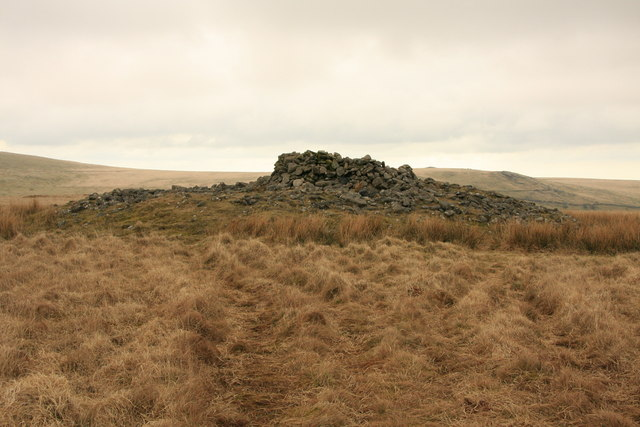
cairn at Stalldown Barrow
