= Maughanasilly Stone Row =

- Galláin Fhearann Mhacha na Sailí (Irish)
- Location within Ireland
- 51.770430°N 9.386835°W
- Type: stone row
- Location: Maughanasilly, Kealkill, County Cork, Ireland

History
- Built: c. 1600–1500 BC

Site notes
- Elevation: 122 m (400 ft)

National monument of Ireland
- Official name: Maughanasilly Stone Row

Maughanasilly Stone Row is a stone row and National Monument located in County Cork, Ireland.

== Location ==
The stone row is located to the northeast of Lough Atooreen, on the eastern slopes of Knockbreteen, 2.3 km (1.4 mi) north of Kealkill. Another stone circle is at Illane, 1.1 km (0.68 mi) NNE of Maughanasilly.

== History ==
Maughanasilly Stone Row was erected during the Bronze Age, c. 1600–1500 BC, making it contemporary with the Indo-Aryan migrations and the rise of Shang China, the New Kingdom of Egypt and Mycenaean Greece. It was used for archaeoastronomical purposes, for making observations of lunar standstills and equinoxes.

It was excavated in 1977 by Ann Lynch. Shallow pits were found with quartz pebbles scattered around. Two flint scrapers were also found.

== Description ==
There are five standing stones and one prostrate stone, aligned approximate NE-SW. The tallest stone is 1.35 m (4 ft 5 in) high and weighs about 8 tonnes.
