= Roland E. Hill =

American art director, set designer, and architect

Roland Everett Hill
- Born: February 5, 1895
- Died: November 10, 1986 (aged 91)
- Occupations: Art director, set designer, architect
- Years active: 1925—1953
- Employer(s): National Studios; Warner Bros. The Walt Disney Company
- Known for: Sleeping Beauty Castle
- Style: Storybook, French Medieval
- Spouse: Mildred née Pannill
- Children: 2

Roland Everett Hill (February 5, 1895 – November 10, 1986) was an American art director, set designer, and architect active in Los Angeles, California in the 1920s through 1950s. His best known work is the Sleeping Beauty Castle at Disneyland.

== Biography ==
=== Early life ===
Roland E. Hill was born on February 5, 1895. He served as a pilot in the Army Air Service during World War I, where, according to his grandson, he was injured in a crash, then chauffeured officers in France and Germany, during which time he sketched the many castles he saw. Hill also met Walt Disney during this time and they formed a friendship over his drawings.

=== Career ===
Hill graduated from art school in 1924 and moved to Los Angeles to design houses in the mid-1920s. He worked as art director and set designer from 1925 to 1953 and as an architect in the 1950s. He was considered a specialist in ships and French medieval architecture.

Hill began his film career as a set designer for National Studios, then moved to Warner Brothers when they took over National, then joined Walt Disney Pictures in the early 1950s. Films he worked on include Captain Horatio Hornblower, 20,000 Leagues Under the Sea, and westerns filmed on the Warner Bros. Ranch.

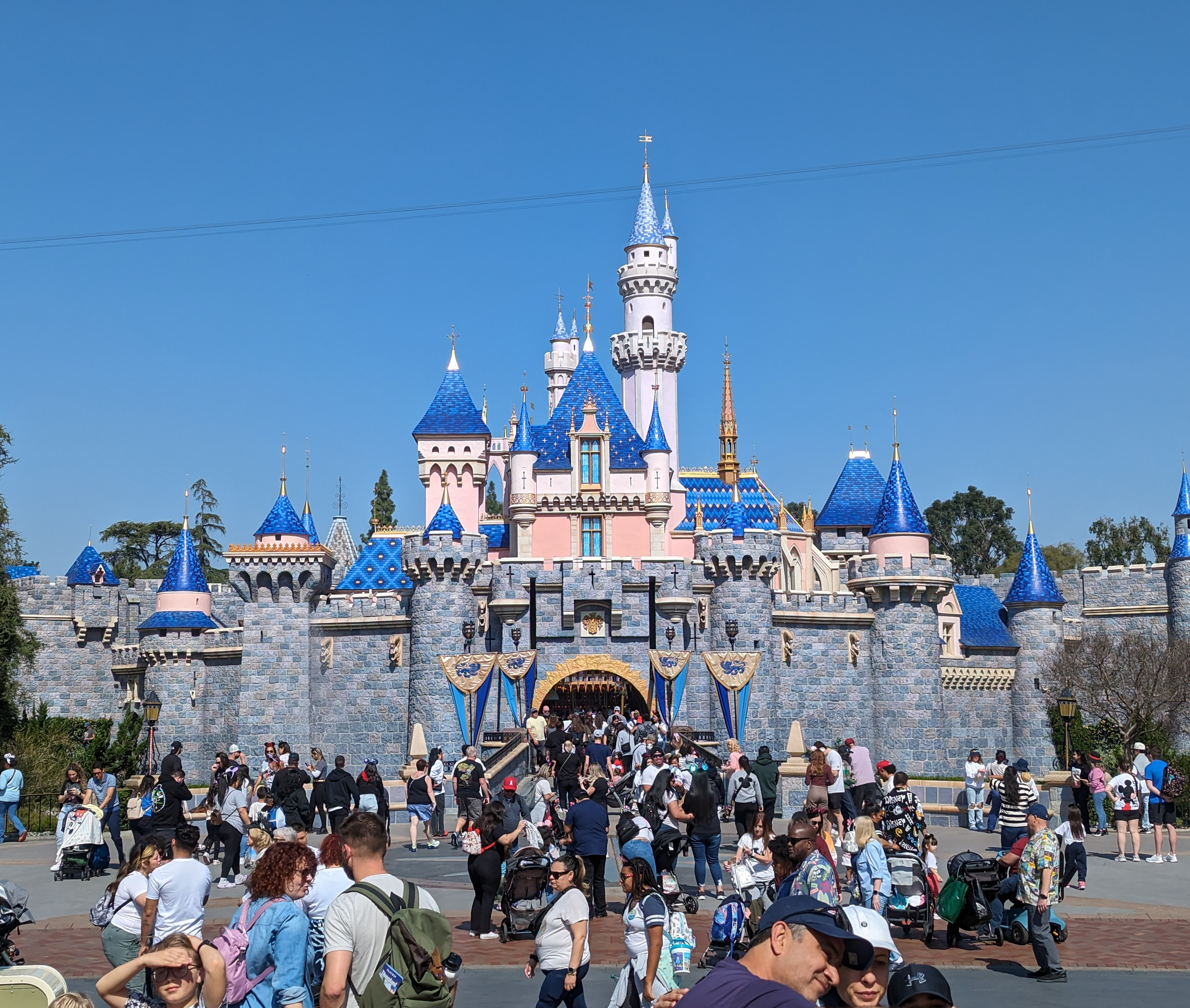
Sleeping Beauty Castle in 2024

As an architect, Hill designed several buildings for The Walt Disney Company, including the Sleeping Beauty Castle at Disneyland. He also designed Roland E. Hill House, which was built in 1926 and declared Los Angeles Historic Cultural Monument No. 917 in 2008, and several other fantasy-inspired homes in the Hollywood Hills and elsewhere.

Hill also painted with watercolors.

=== Personal life and death ===
Hill married Mildred née Pannill and they had two sons together, one of whom, Roland Hill Jr, was an art director, and the other, Jack Hill, was a director. Hill died on November 10, 1986 at age 91.

== List of works ==
=== Set designer and art director ===
- The Jazz Singer (1927)
- Queen Kelly (1929)
- Captain Blood (1935)
- Action in the North Atlantic (1943)
- Captain Horatio Hornblower (1951)
- 20,000 Leagues Under the Sea (1954)

=== Architect ===
- Roland E. Hill House (1926), Los Angeles Historic Cultural Monument No. 917
- Sleeping Beauty Castle (1955)

== See also ==
- List of American architects
- List of people from Los Angeles
