= Rowland Vaughan (disambiguation) =

Rowland Vaughan may refer to:

- Rowland Vaughan (1559–1629), an English lord
- Rowland Vaughan (poet) (died 1667), Welsh poet and translator
- Rowland Vaughan (MP) (died 1566), MP for Breconshire and Brecon
