= Rowland H. Rerick =

American newspaper publisher and historian (1857–1925)

Rowland Henry Rerick (1857 – October 23, 1925) was an American newspaper editor and owner. He was also a writer of books on history. During the early years of the 20th century, he wrote the book Memoirs of Florida, a book on political parties in Florida, and a history of Ohio.

He was the son of newspaper publisher and Republican local official John Heaton Rerick (1830–1911). Rowland joined his father's work and continued it after the elder's death. Rowland continued on as owner and editor of the LaGrange Standard newspaper in LaGrange, Indiana, for 14 years until his death. He died at his home in LaGrange.

== Writings ==
- History of Ohio, Covering the Periods of Indian, French and British Dominion, the Territory Northwest, and The Hundred Years of Statehood
- State Centennial history of Ohio : covering the periods of Indian, French and British Dominion, the Territory Northwest, and the hundred years of statehood
- Rerick, Rowland H. (1902). Memories of Florida; Embracing a General History of the Province, Territory, and State; and Special Chapters Devoted to Finances and Banking, the Bench and Bar, Medical Profession, Railways and Navigation, and Industrial Interests – via library.missouri.edu.
- Rerick, Rowland H. (2016). History of Ohio, Covering the Periods of Indian, French and British Dominion, the Territory Northwest, and the Hundred Years of Statehood. BiblioBazaar. ISBN 9781363025442 – via Google Books.
- Political parties in Florida, 1841–1900
