= Roland Hill (cricketer) =

Australian cricketer

Personal information
- Born: 18 October 1868; Adelaide, Australia
- Died: 10 January 1929 (aged 60); Glenelg, South Australia
- Role: Wicket keeper
- Source: Cricinfo, 6 August 2020

Roland Hill (18 October 1868 – 10 January 1929) was an Australian cricketer. He played in one first-class match for South Australia in 1893/94.

Keeping to South Australian fast bowler Ernie Jones, Hill split his left hand in the first over of the match, affecting his keeping ability, and never played first-class cricket again.

== See also ==
- List of South Australian representative cricketers

== Sources ==
- Whimpress, B. (2007) Lives in Cricket No. 4 - Ernie Jones, Association of Cricket Statisticians and Historians: Cardiff. ISBN 9781905138524.
