= Rowland Percy Moss =

- Born: 8 May 1928; London
- Died: 11 January 1993; Stockport, Cheshire
- Occupation: Economy
- Known for: Works on Development in Tropical Africa

Rowland Percy Moss (1928–1993) was an Economist and researcher at the United Nations University interested in the relationship between geography and wealth. He is known for his work on Development in Tropical Africa.

As of 1982 he was Professor of Geography at the University of Salford with a special interest in human ecology. His academic career included ten years in Nigeria lecturing in soli science. He worked as consultant on Third world problems and tropical agricultural development in Africa and Asia.

He was an Anglican lay reader and published books and articles on issues related to faith and the environment .

== Publications ==
- (as editor) The Soil resources of tropical Africa: a symposium of the African Studies Association of the United Kingdom. London, Cambridge University Press, 1968. ISBN 0-521-05772-8 Abstract
- Edited with M. R. Kettle. Southern Africa studies: report of a symposium held at the School of Oriental and African Studies in the University of London on 24th September, 1969, by the African Studies Association of the U.K. In: Symposium on Southern African Studies, London, 1969. Birmingham, African Studies Association of the U.K., 1970. ISBN 0-901708-01-1
- The ecology of human communities. Birmingham: University of Birmingham, 1974. ISBN 0-7044-0097-9
- Edited with R. J. A. R. Rathbone. The Population factor in African studies: the proceedings of a conference organized by the African Studies Association of the United Kingdom, September 1972. London: University of London Press, 1975. ISBN 0-340-18353-5
- Concept and theory in land evaluation for rural land use planning. Department of Geography, ?, 1978.
- A chapter on soils and soil management. In: Ronald James Harrison Church. West Africa: a study of the environment and of man’s use of it. London/New York: Longman, 1980. ISBN 0-582-30020-7
- Edited with William Basil Morgan and G. J. Afolabi Ojo. Rural energy systems in the humid tropics: proceedings of the First Workshop of the United Nations University Rural Energy Systems Project, Ife, Nigeria, 10–12 August 1978. Workshop of the United Nations University Rural Energy Systems Project (Ife, Nigeria, 1978.) Tokyo, Japan: United Nations University, c1980. ISBN 92-808-0093-0
- With William Basil Morgan.Fuelwood and rural energy production and supply in the humid tropics: a report for the United Nations University with special reference to Tropical Africa and South-East Asia. Dublin: Published for the United Nations University by Tycooly International, 1981. ISBN 0-907567-08-8 ISBN 0907567037
- Reflections on the relations between forest and savanna in tropical West Africa. Salford: Department of Geography, University of Salford, 1982.
- The Earth in our Hands 1982 ISBN 0-85110-427-4 published by Inter-Varsity Press
- Environmental Constraints on Development in Tropical Africa. In: M. B. Gleave (editor). Tropical African Development: Geographical Perspectives. Burnt Mill, Harlow: Longmans; New York: John Wiley & Sons, 1992, pp. 50–92. ISBN 978-0-582-30147-4

Book review In: Third World Planning Review. Liverpool University Press, ISSN 0142-7849 vol. 15, no. 4, 1993. p. 429-
