= Rowland Winn =

Rowland Winn may refer to:

- Rowland Winn, 1st Baron St Oswald (1820–1893), industrialist, Conservative politician
- Rowland Winn, 2nd Baron St Oswald (1857–1919), Conservative MP, son of the above
- Rowland Winn, 4th Baron St Oswald, (1916–1984), British soldier and Conservative MP
