= Rowland Brotherhood (cricketer) =

English cricketer and civil engineer

Personal information
- Full name: Rowland Brotherhood
- Born: 18 November 1841; Brinkworth, Wiltshire, England
- Batting: Left-handed
- Bowling: Left-arm underarm fast

Domestic team information
- Years: Team
- 1875: Gloucestershire

Career statistics
Competition	First-class
Matches	3
Runs scored	3
Batting average	0.75
100s/50s	–/–
Top score	2
Balls bowled	120
Wickets	2
Bowling average	33.50
5 wickets in innings	–
10 wickets in match	–
Best bowling	2/49
Catches/stumpings	1/–
- Source: Cricinfo, 27 July 2011

Rowland Brotherhood (18 November 1841 – before 1938) was an English cricketer and civil engineer. Brotherhood was a left-handed batsman who bowled left-arm underarm fast.

== Life ==
One of 14 children of Priscilla and Rowland Brotherhood, an engineer, he was born in Brinkworth, Wiltshire.

He made his first-class debut for Gloucestershire against Sussex in 1875. He made two further first-class appearances, both in 1875, against Yorkshire and Nottinghamshire. In his three matches, he took two wickets at an average of 33.50, with best figures of 2/49.

From 1877 to 1879 Brotherhood was assisted by his father in sinking shafts for the Severn Tunnel. He practised as a consulting civil engineer with offices in Victoria Street, Westminster, alongside many other consulting engineers. In 1892, his office was put into receivership.

His death is not recorded, however his younger brother John died in 1938 and the notice of his death in The Times indicates that he was the last surviving son of Rowland Brotherhood, senior.
