= Rowland Griffiths Bowen =

Commander Rowland Griffiths Bowen, OBE (14 January 1879 – 21 October 1965) was a Royal Australian Navy officer who saw active service during the First World War.

He later served as Australian Registrar and Priory Secretary of the Order of St. John of Jerusalem.
