= Rowland Whitehead =

Rowland Whitehead may refer to:

- Sir Rowland Whitehead, 3rd Baronet (1863–1942), British barrister and Liberal Party politician
- Sir Rowland Whitehead, 5th Baronet (1930–2007), British baronet and merchant banker
