= Rowland Wilson =

Rowland Wilson may refer to:

- Rowland Wilson (cricketer) (1868–1959), English clergyman
- Rowland Wilson (politician) (1613–1650), English politician
- Rowland B. Wilson (1930–2005), American cartoonist
