= Rowland Burdon =

Rowland Burdon may refer to:

- Rowland Burdon (Sedgefield MP) (1857–1944)
- Rowland Burdon (died 1838) (c. 1757–1838), MP for County Durham
