= Rowland Berkeley =

Rowland Berkeley may refer to:

- Rowland Berkeley (died 1611) (1548–1611), English politician
- Rowland Berkeley (died 1696) (1613–1696), English politician
- Rowland Hill Berkeley (1849–1905), English politician
