= Rowland Baring =

Rowland Baring may refer to:

- Rowland Baring, 2nd Earl of Cromer (1877–1953), British peer
- Rowland Baring, 3rd Earl of Cromer (1918–1991), British peer
