= Rowland Brotherhood =

British engineer

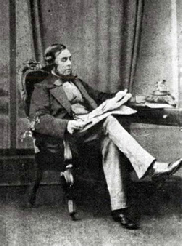

Rowland Brotherhood (or sometimes Roland Brotherhood) was a British engineer. He was born in Middlesex in 1812 and died in Bristol in 1883.

== Career ==
From 1835, he took on a number of contracts for building parts of the Great Western Railway (GWR). By 1838, he was resident in Reading, Berkshire, and continued to do contract work for the GWR.

In 1841, he moved to Chippenham, Wiltshire, where he bought Orwell House on New Road, and took over a blacksmith's business. Soon after, he began production of railway fittings and developed an ironworks on land north of Chippenham station. The business expanded in the 1850s and 1860s, with more land purchased to the north and east. Contract work for the GWR continued until 1861 when there was a dispute with that company; from 1861 to 1869 Brotherhood built components for railways and bridges across the British Empire, together with wagons and a small number of locomotives.

Activity at the Chippenham Works declined in the mid-1860s, and in 1869 it closed with extensive financial losses incurred by Brotherhood. The Works remained empty until the 1890s when the site was bought by Saxby and Farmer, railway signalling manufacturers, later becoming the Westinghouse Brake and Signal Company.

Brotherhood left Chippenham in 1868 and was appointed general manager of the Bute Ironworks in Cardiff. In 1874 he moved to Bristol and in 1875 he took a contract to build a goods shed for the GWR. From 1877 to 1879 Brotherhood assisted his son, also called Rowland, in sinking shafts for the Severn Tunnel.

Rowland Brotherhood (senior) died at his home in Bristol on 4 March 1883, and is buried there in Arnos Vale Cemetery.

== Personal life ==
He married Priscilla Penton in 1835 and they had 14 children. One son, also Rowland, played cricket for Gloucestershire.

== See also ==
- Peter Brotherhood – engineering firm owned by his son and descendants

== Sources ==
- "A Centenary Note – R. Brotherhood". irsociety.co.uk.
- "Rowland Brotherhood". Chippenham Town Council. Archived from the original on 30 January 2009.
- "Chippenham Conservation Area Appraisal" (PDF). wiltshire.gov.uk. November 2007. p. 33.
