= Rowland Lyttleton Archer Davies =

Rowland Lyttleton Archer Davies (28 March 1837 – 11 July 1881) was an Australian writer.

Davies was the son of Ven. Rowland Robert Davies, at one time Colonial Chaplain of Tasmania, and subsequently Archdeacon of Hobart (who came of a Mallow family, and died in 1880), was born in Longford, Van Diemen's Land. He was sent to England for his education, and returned to Tasmania in 1859. Davies, who at a very early period cultivated the belles lettres, married in Jan. 1875, and died on 11 July 1881. After his death a selection from his literary productions was published, under the editorship of his English tutor: Poems and other Literary Remains, edited, with biographical sketch, by Charles Tomlinson, F.R.S. (Stanford, 1884).
