= Rowland Mainwaring (Royal Navy officer) =

Royal Navy officer (1783–1862)

Rear-Admiral Rowland Mainwaring DL JP
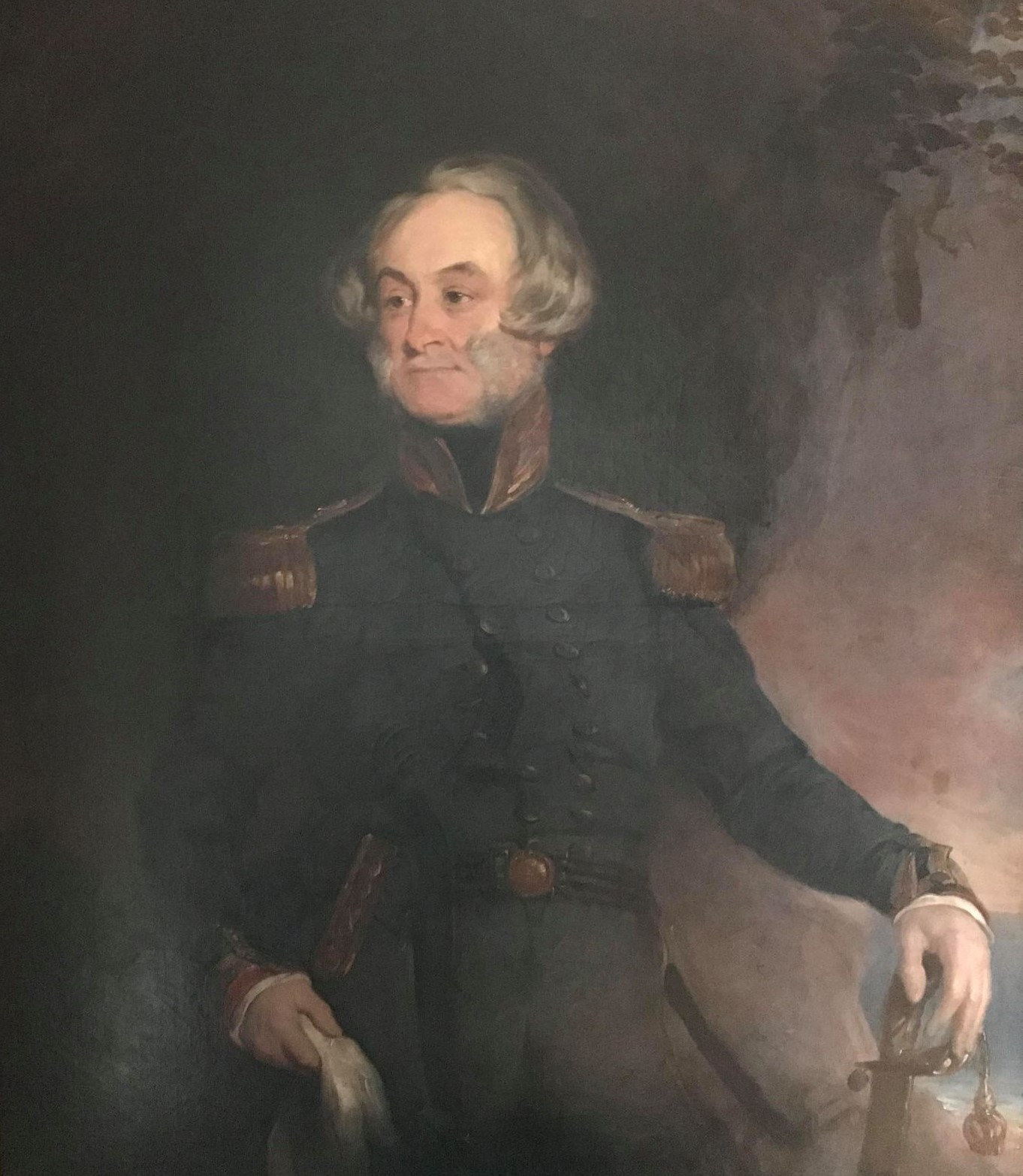
- Captain Mainwaring by John Phillip, May 1841
- Born: 31 December 1783
- Died: 1862 (aged 73)
- Military career
- Allegiance: United Kingdom
- Branch: Royal Navy
- Rank: Rear-Admiral
- Conflicts: French campaign in Egypt; Battle of the Nile; West Indies campaign; Invasion of Martinique

Rear-Admiral Rowland Mainwaring DL JP (31 December 1783 – 1862) was an English officer in the Royal Navy.

== Origins ==
Rowland Mainwaring, born on 31 December 1783, was the eldest surviving son of Rowland Mainwaring, Esq., of Four Oaks, County Warwick, a field officer, by Jane, daughter of Captain Latham, Royal Navy. He was a cousin of Rear-Admiral Thomas Francis Charles Mainwaring; and was the representative of an ancient Staffordshire family, settled for many centuries at Whitmore Hall, near Newcastle-under-Lyne.

== Career ==
He entered the Royal Navy in May 1795, on board the Jupiter, Captain William Lechmere, at Sheerness, and during that year became Midshipman of the Scipio, 64 guns, Captain Robert McDoual, on the West India station, where, after serving for a short time with Captain Francis Laforey in the frigate Beaulieu and Ganges in early 1796 he joined HMS Majestic Captains George Blagden Westcott and Robert Cuthbert, bearing the flag at first of Sir John Laforey. (Note: But cf. Marshall, who states that Mainwaring entered the Navy in 1795 under the patronage of Sir John Laforey and continued to serve in his flag-ship until his death, which occurred when returning from the West Indies to England.)

He was also on board HMS Majestic at the battle of the Nile, after which, in consequence of Captain Westcott having been killed, he was, in October 1798, removed into the frigate Thalia, commanded by Lord Henry Paulet, under whom he was further employed in the Defence, 74 guns, on different European stations, until within a short period of his being made Lieutenant, on 7 December 1801, he was appointed lieutenant of the Harpy sloop, Captains Charles Worsley Boys and Edmund Heywood. (Note: The Harpy was under Captain Charles William Boys, an officer who had lost a leg on the memorable 1st of June, 1794, and who was cut off in the prime of life, while commanding the Statira frigate, on the Halifax station, on 17 November 1809.)

Mainwaring's subsequent appointments were to the frigate Leda, under Captain Robert Honyman; the Terrible, 74 guns, under Captain Lord Henry Paulet; and, as first lieutenant, to the Narcissus and Menelaus frigates, and in the latter ships he was actively employed, off Brest, in the Bay of Biscay, on the coast of Portugal, in the West Indies, and on the southern coasts of France and Spain, under the successive commands of Captains Charles Malcolm, the Hon. Frederick Whitworth Aylmer, and Sir Peter Parker, Bart., until some time after his promotion to the rank of commander, by commission dated 13 August 1812. On 18 August 1807, he assisted in capturing the Spanish national schooner Cantela, pierced for twelve guns; and in April 1809, he was present at the reduction of the Saintes, near Guadaloupe. The services in which he participated between July 1809 and December 1810 were in connexion with Captain Frederick Aylmer. The following is the copy of an official letter written by Sir Peter Parker, who was once Mainwaring's messmate in the Leda:

HMS Menelaus, off Villa Francha, 1 March 1812.

Sir,– I feel great pleasure in acquainting you of the capture of a beautiful French brig, on her first voyage, named the St. Joseph, from Genoa, laden with naval stores for the arsenal at Toulon. This service was performed last night, by Lieutenant Rowland Mainwaring, first of the Menelaus, in a masterly manner, near the Bay of Frejus, where the St. Joseph was moored within pistol-shot of a battery flanked by another; also by musketry from the shore. The judgment and ability shewn by Lieutenant Mainwaring, an old and meritorious officer, added to the enthusiastic spirit displayed by the officers and men, who gallantly seconded him in this affair, was such as to call forth my admiration and respect, and no doubt will be duly appreciated by you, more particularly as from the style in which the enterprise was conducted, I am afforded the gratification of forwarding this report, without subjoining a list either of killed or wounded. I have the honor to be, &c.

(Signed) Peter Parker.

To Captain John Tower,
HMS Curaçoa.

The St. Joseph was pierced for sixteen guns, but had none mounted. One of the batteries on shore suffered severely from the fire of the launch of the Menelaus. On 27 April 1812, while off Toulon, the Menelaus was approached by two French frigates, one of them of the largest class, and both under a press of sail. The British ship lay-to and cleared for action; but to the great surprise of all on board, the enemy hauled their wind when nearly within gun-shot, and declined giving battle. In the ensuing month, Sir Peter Parker reported as follows:

HMS Menalaus, 18 May 1812.

Sir,– I have the honor to enclose the reports of the in-shore squadron, since my last return, by the Imperieuse. The enemy, you will observe, have been reinforced by a frigate from the westward, hut arc otherwise in the same state; one three-decker, with fore and main-top-masts struck, in the outer harbour, being the only difference; and one two-decker, apparently new, I conclude has come from the inner road.

While writing this, the enemy came out, twelve sail of the line and seven frigates. A line-of-battle ship and two frigates were sent in chase of H.M. squadron; the rest of their fleet edging down towards the chasing ships. My object was to lead them to leeward; but the Pelorus sailing badly, her fate now became doubtful; when the ships under my orders shortened sail, and hoisted their colours. The enemy, seeing our determination not to part with H.M. brig, relinquished the chase.

I trust this little affair will appear as creditable to H.M. arms, as disgraceful to the enemy. Suffice it to say, nothing could exceed the exemplary conduct of all ranks and classes in the squadron.

My acknowledgments are particularly due to the Hon. Captain Cadogan, and Captains Monusey and Rowley; and I trust I may be permitted once more to mention the attention and assistance which are over afforded me by Lieutenant Rowland Mainwaring. I have the honor to be, &c.

(Signed) Peter Parker.

To Vice-Admiral Sir Edward Pellew.

30 May 1812.

Sir,– I have the honor to inform you, that, on the morning of the 29th instant, an enemy’s frigate and brig were discovered in Hiéres bay, steering with the wind easterly, for the Petite Passe, evidently with the intention of getting into Toulon; but, on seeing H.M. ship under my command make sail to cut them off, and having answered signals from their commander-in-chief in that harbour, they took in their studding-sails, and hauled to the wind, until the French fleet, consisting of eleven sail of the line and six frigates, came out of port, causing the frigate and brig to bear up and join them.

Although, from the superior force I now had to contend with, I could not flatter myself with much prospect of success, yet I considered it my duty to bring them to action, which was done close under the batteries of Escamberon. The Menelaus was necessarily exposed to a warm and raking fire, going in, and some time elapsed before it was returned. Soon after, however, I had the mortification to sec our fore-top-mast shot almost in two; and thus I was obliged to relinquish the idea of attempting any thing farther, and am indebted to the superior sailing of the ship, and the extraordinary conduct of the enemy, for greater ills not befalling us; for, independent of the inability of carrying sail on the tottering top-mast, we appeared as it were surrounded; the enemy’s ships being to leeward, and the advanced ship of the line, after firing her broad-side, having tacked and stood in; added to which, Rear-Admiral Hallowell’s squadron was so far to leeward as not to afford a hope of any assistance from him; and our fleet only to be seen from the mast-head.

As this affair took place under the enemy’s batteries, at the mouth of their harbour, I trust that notwithstanding the unfortunate circumstances attending, to foil our endeavours, I may be permitted to speak, in terms of admiration, of the gallantry and good conduct of Lieutenant Mainwaring, which was only equalled by that of my other officers and the ship’s company. Our damage is confined to masts, sails, and rigging. I have the honor to be, &c.

(Signed) Peter Parker.

To Vice-Admiral Sir Edward Pellew.

In July 1812 the Menelaus was cruising on the coast of Italy, and Sir Peter Parker reported the capture of the French xebec La Paix, mounting two long 6-pounders, with a complement of thirty men, "under circumstances peculiarly honourable to Lieutenant Mainwaring, who boarded and brought her out from within pistol-shot of the towers of Terracina, under a galling fire. If any thing from my pen", he continues, "could do justice to his merit, I would write it with pleasure, but that I feel to be impossible. The Menelaus was anchored well within range of the batteries; the distance, however, in consequence of the shoal water, prevented her fire being of that effect, against such strong defences, which was intended. I have to regret one seaman killed by a grape-shot."

During the night of 2 September 1812, the French letter of marque St. Esprit, pierced for twelve guns, but with only two six-pounders mounted, was cut out from the river Mignone, near Civita Vecchia, under a heavy fire from the batteries. This service was performed in a calm, without loss, and in a manner "highly creditable to Lieutenant Mainwaring", by whom the boats were again commanded. Sir Peter Parker's next official report was to the following effect:

The port of Mejan, in the bay of Marseilles, was attacked by the Menelaus yesterday afternoon (17 September 1812). The detachment of boats, under Lieutenants Mainwaring and Yates, burnt the vessels in the harbour, while Lieutenant Beynon, R.M., and Mr. James Saunderson, master's-mate, dislodged the enemy, and destroyed the custom-house and magazines. Never was gallantry more conspicuous than in the officers and men on this service, and I beg to recommend them to your favorable notice. Lieutenant Yates, an active and promising officer, I regret to add, was unfortunately killed, with one seaman and five marines wounded. The loss of the enemy was very considerable.

To Sir Edward Pellew, Bart., &c. &c.

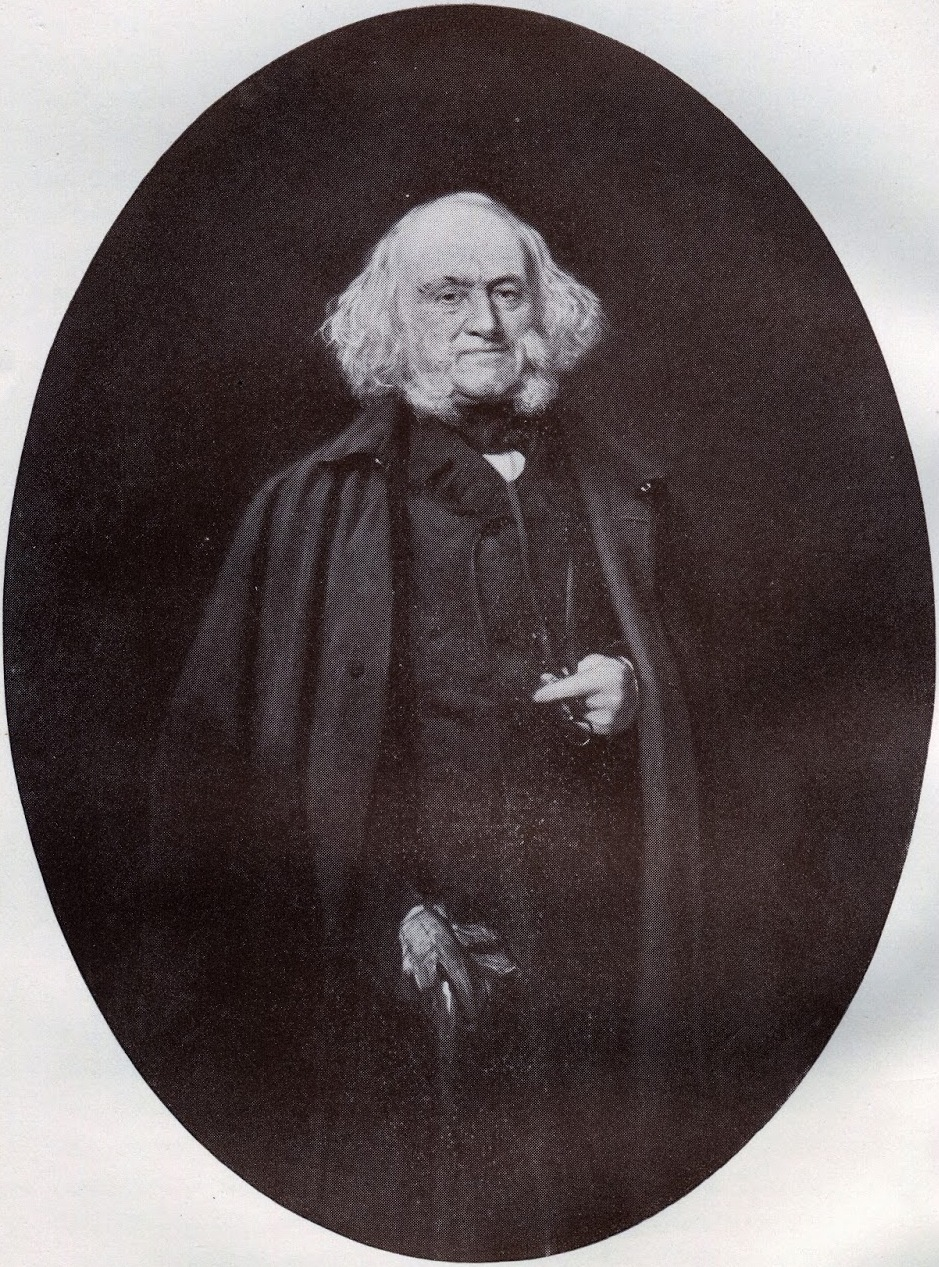
Rear-Admiral Rowland Mainwaring, aged 78

After commanding for some time the Gorgon, 44 guns, armed en flûte, at Port Mahon, Mainwaring was successively appointed acting captain of the Edinburgh, 74 guns, Undaunted and Euryalus frigates, and Caledonia first-rate, the latter ship bearing the flag of Sir Edward Pellew. He was subsequently placed by that officer in the Kite sloop, and sent to the Archipelago, where he destroyed a French privateer, rescued a valuable merchantman which she had captured, and obtained from the Bey of Salonica a promise, that in future no vessels of the same description should be equipped in his harbours. He afterwards commanded the Paulina sloop, in which he obtained restitution of two merchant vessels, taken by an American privateer and carried to Tripoli, where he remained watching the enemy until the final cessation of hostilities, thereby preventing her from giving any further annoyance to the British trade in the Mediterranean. The Paulina was paid off, at Deptford, towards the close of 1815, from which period there is no official mention of Mainwaring, until his advancement to the rank of captain on 22 July 1830.

== Personal life ==
Rowland Mainwaring married, first, in January 1811, Sophia Henrietta, only child of Major William Duff, 20th Regiment, and daughter-in-law to Captain George Tobin, Royal Navy, CB. Secondly, in 1827, Eliza, daughter of the Rev. M. J. Hill, rector of Snailwell, in Cambridgeshire. His son, Rowland Mainwaring, midshipman of the Warspite, 76 guns, died at Port Jackson, of dysentery, on 27 October 1826.

== Arms ==
Coat of arms of Rowland Mainwaring, Esq.
Crest Out of a ducal coronet, or, an ass's head, haltered, proper. Escutcheon Argent, two bars, gules. Motto Devant si je puis.

== Sources ==
- Cavenagh-Mainwaring, J. G. (1934). Mainwarings of Whitmore and Biddulph in the County of Stafford. pp. 114–117.

Attribution:

- Burke, Bernard (1863). A Genealogical and Heraldic Dictionary of the Landed Gentry of Great Britain and Ireland. Part 2. 4th ed. London: Harrison. p. 964.
- Marshall, John (1832). "Mainwaring, Rowland". Royal Naval Biography. Captains of 1830. Vol. 3, Part 2. London. pp. 126–130.
- Marshall, John (1825). "Aylmer, Frederick". Royal Naval Biography. Post-Captains of 1805, Volume 2, Part 2. London. pp. 948–950.
- O'Byrne, William R. (1849). "Mainwaring, Rowland". A Naval Biographical Dictionary. London: John Murray. p. 711.
