= Rowland Alston =

Rowland Alston may refer to:

- Sir Rowland Alston, 2nd Baronet (c. 1654–1697) of the Alston Baronets
- Sir Rowland Alston, 4th Baronet (c. 1678–1769), MP for Bedfordshire 1722–1741
- Sir Rowland Alston, 6th Baronet (died 1791), High Sheriff of Bedfordshire
- Rowland Alston (1782–1865), MP for Hertfordshire 1835–41

== See also ==
- Alston (name)
