= Rowland Davies =

Rowland Davies may refer to:

- Rowland Lyttleton Archer Davies (1837–1881), Australian author
- Rowland Davies (priest), Church of Ireland dean of Cork
- Rowland Davies, fictional character in List of Tales of the Unexpected episodes

== See also ==
- Roland Davies, comics artist
