= Rowland Stephenson =

Rowland Stephenson may refer to:

- Rowland Stephenson (banker) (1782–1856), British politician
- Rowland Stephenson (Carlisle MP) (??–1807), English politician
- Rowland Macdonald Stephenson (1808–1895), British engineer
