= Stone row =

Linear row of standing stones

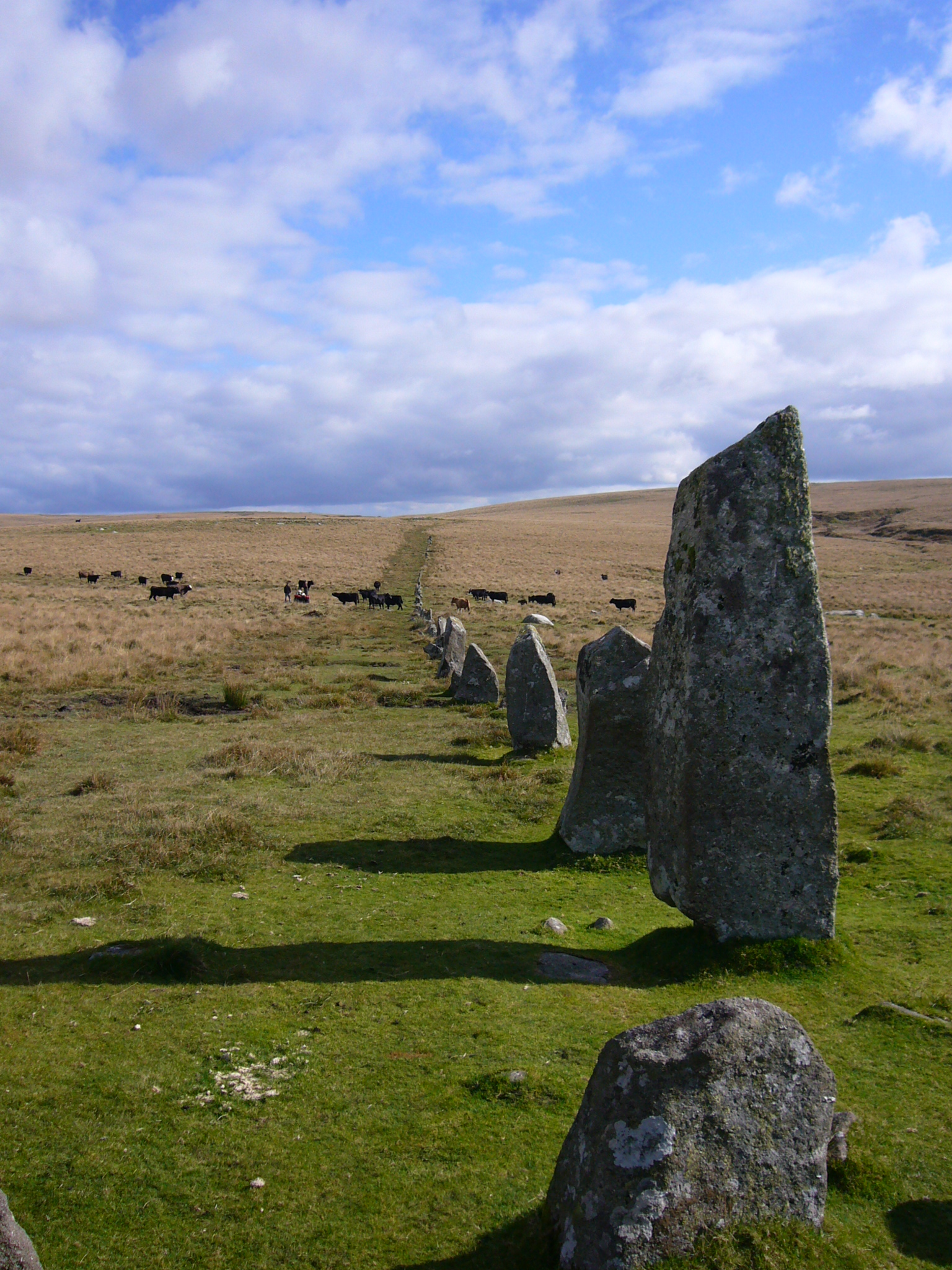
Down Tor stone row on Dartmoor, UK

A stone row or stone alignment is a linear arrangement of megalithic standing stones set at intervals along a common axis or series of axes, usually dating from the later Neolithic or Bronze Age. Rows may be individual or grouped, and three or more aligned stones can constitute a row.

== Description ==
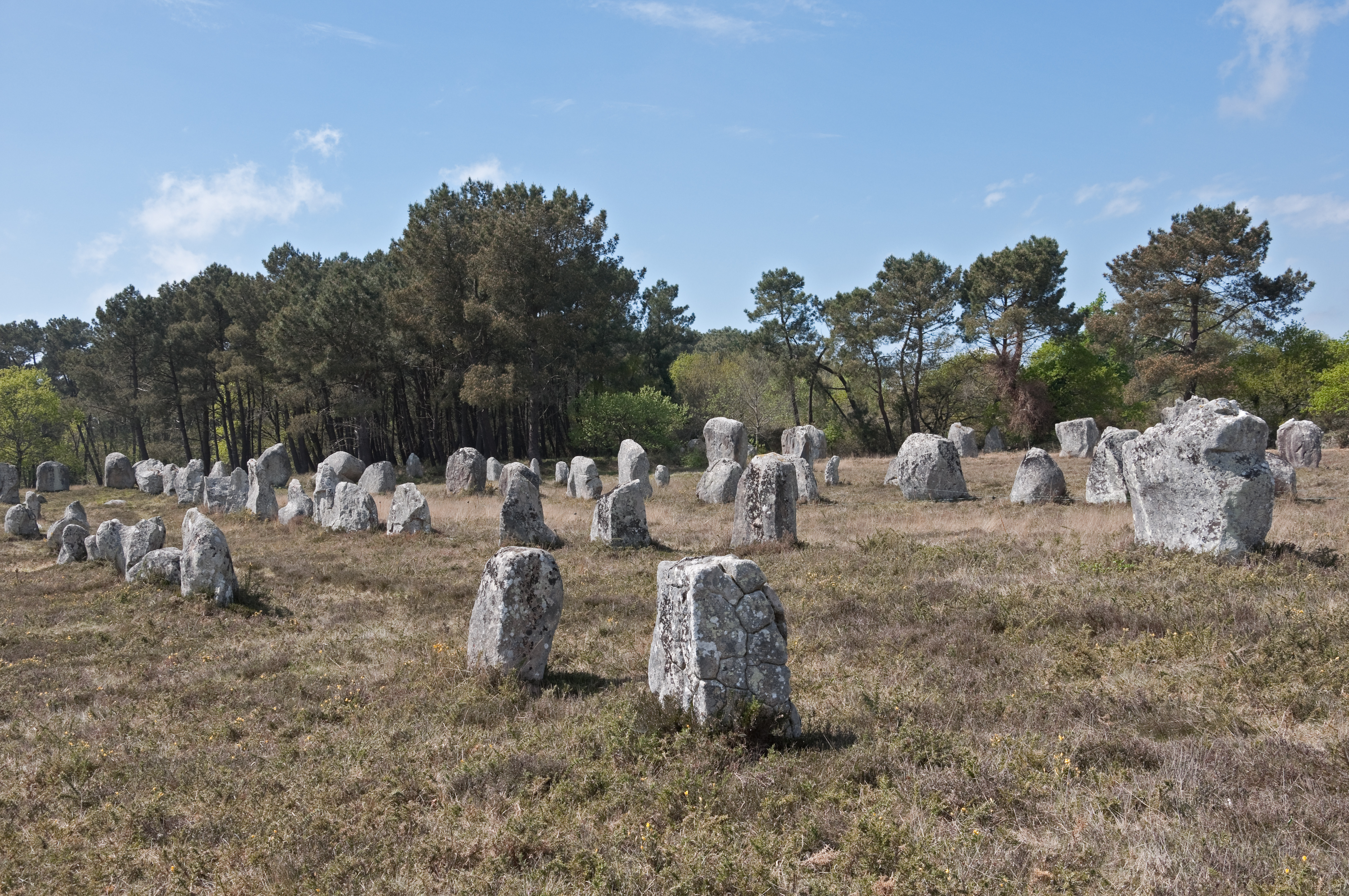
Part of the Kerlescan alignment in Carnac, Brittany

The term alignment is sometimes taken to imply that the rows were placed purposely in relation to other factors such as other monuments or topographical or astronomical features. Archaeologists treat stone rows as discrete features however and alignment refers to the stones being lined up with one another rather than anything else. Their purpose is thought to be religious or ceremonial, perhaps marking a processional route. Another theory is that each generation would erect a new stone to contribute to a sequence that demonstrated a people's continual presence.

Stone rows can be few metres or several kilometres in length and made from stones that can be as tall as 2m, although 1m high stones are more common. The terminals of many rows have the largest stones and other megalithic features are sometimes sited at the ends, especially burial cairns. The stones are placed at intervals and may vary in height along the sequence, to provide a graduated appearance, though it is not known whether this was done deliberately. Stone rows were erected by the later Neolithic and Bronze Age peoples in the British Isles, parts of Scandinavia and northern France.

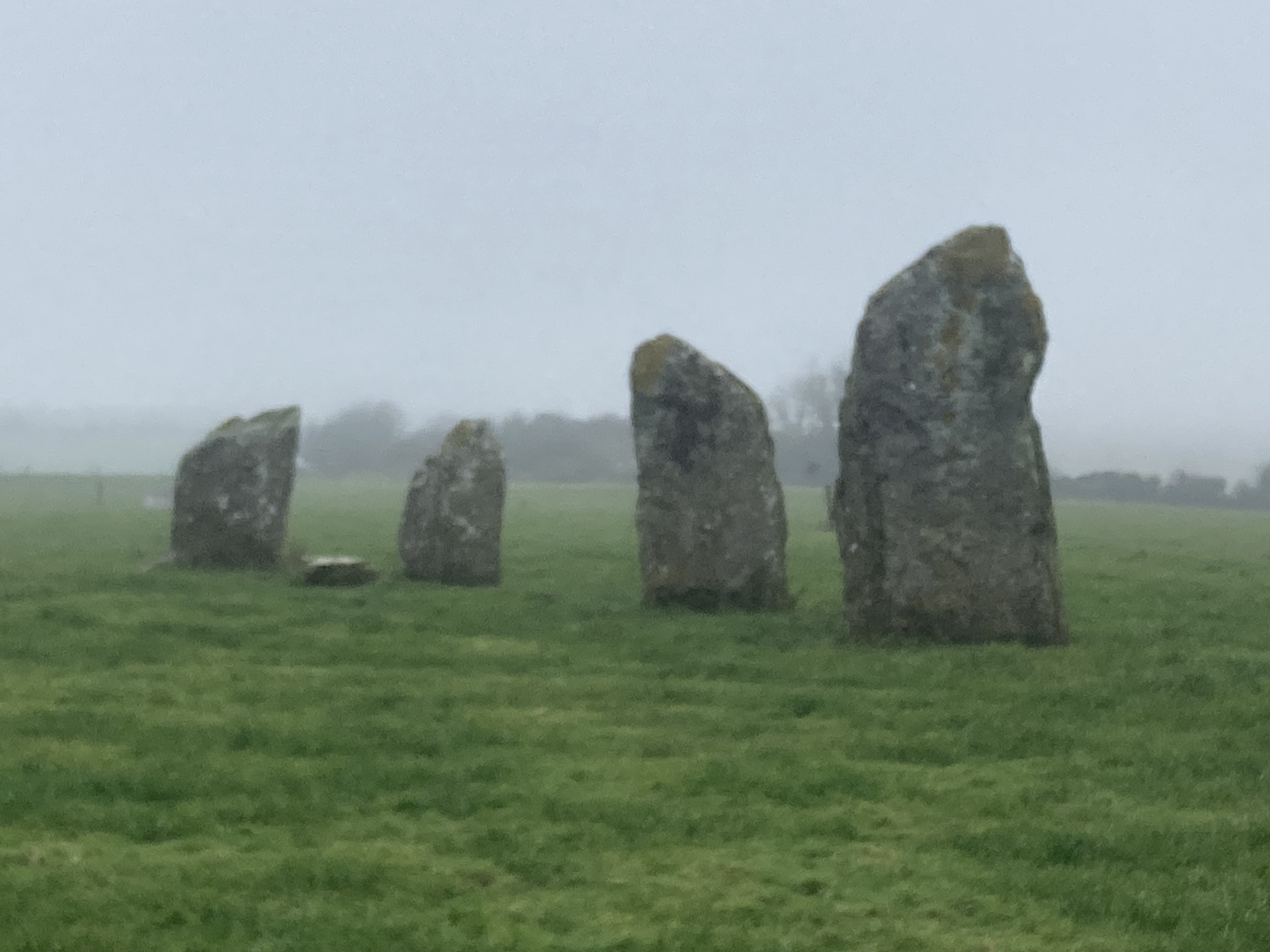
Castlenalacht Stone Row, County Cork, Ireland

A well known example is the Carnac stones, a complex of stone rows in Brittany. There are a number of examples on Dartmoor including the row at Stalldown Barrow and three rows at Drizzlecombe and the Hill O Many Stanes in Caithness. In Britain they are exclusively found in isolated moorland areas.

== Examples ==
- Beenalaght - Six stones (one fallen), County Cork, Ireland
- Coolcoulaghta Standing Stones - two stones, County Cork, Ireland
- Eightercua - Four stones, County Kerry, Ireland
- Knocknakilla - Four stones (one fallen), County Cork, Ireland
- Maughanasilly Stone Row - five stones (one fallen), County Cork, Ireland

== Sources ==
- Ó Nualláin, Seán. "Stone Rows in the South of Ireland". Proceedings of the Royal Irish Academy: Archaeology, Culture, History, Literature, volume 88C, 1988. JSTOR 25516044
- Power, Denis. Archaeological inventory of County Cork, Volume 3: Mid Cork. Stationery Office, 1992. ISBN 978-0-7076-4933-7
- Lancaster Brown, P. (1976). Megaliths, myths, and men: an introduction to astro-archaeology. New York: Taplinger Pub. Co.
- Ruggles, Clive. "The Stone Rows of South-west Ireland: A First Reconnaissance". Journal for the History of Astronomy, Archaeoastronomy, Supplement, volume 25, 1994
