= Rowland White =

Rowland White may refer to:

- Rowland White (British writer) (born 1970), British writer on aviation
- Rowland White (Irish writer) (died 1572), Irish writer, and political and religious reformer

== See also ==
- Rowland Whyte (died after 1626), Elizabethan official and businessman
