= Rowland Leigh (MP) =

16th-century English politician

Rowland Leigh (died by 17 June 1603) was the member of Parliament for Cricklade in the parliament of 1584.
