= Rowland Robert Teape Davis =

Rowland Robert Teape Davis (c.1807–27 February 1879) was a New Zealand labour reformer, hotel-keeper and politician. He was born in Bantry Bay, County Cork, Ireland on c.1807.
